= Infrastructure of the Settle–Carlisle line =

Ribblehead Viaduct

Settle Junction signal box

Listed bridge north of Dandrymire Viaduct

The Settle–Carlisle line, often described as "England's most scenic rail journey", is famed for its scenery as it climbs through watersheds inbetween Cumbria and North Yorkshire. As it runs through an upland environment, the line is noted for its viaducts, bridges, and tunnels. The line is largely double-track, save for a single-track section over the Ribblehead Viaduct, and runs from Settle Junction in Yorkshire, to Carlisle railway station in Cumbria, England, a distance of over 72 miles (116 km); (Note: The length of the railway varies according to different sources; Trackmaps states the length to be 72 miles 48 chains (116.8 km) whereas the Settle–Carlisle Railway conservation area document states it to be 78 miles (126 km).) with 21 viaducts, (Note: Joy and Mitchell state 20 viaducts.) 14 tunnels, over 320 bridges, 103 culverts, and 19 new stations when built. (Note: Stan Abbott states in Walking the Line that the railway had 325 bridges when it was completed in 1876; newer bridges have been built such as at Carlisle for the M6, or at Appleby, where to the north of the station the railway crosses the dualled A66, though this was previously a bridge which carried the line over another railway.)

The building of the line was divided up into four contracts:

- No. 1 – Settle Junction to Dent Head (17 miles (27 km))
- No. 2 – Dent Head to Smardale (17 miles (27 km))
- No. 3 – Smardale to Newbiggin (14.5 miles (23.3 km))
- No. 4 – Newbiggin to Petteril Bridge Junction (Carlisle) (23.5 miles (37.8 km))

A fifth contract covered the 6-mile (9.7 km) branch to Hawes railway station to connect with the North Eastern Railway line there.

In 1991 the entire railway was designated as a conservation area, the longest conservation area in England, which is also never more than a few hundreds yard wide. The line now has at least seventeen listed structures recorded with Historic England, most of these being grade II, four more than when the conservation area was initially designated. Of the viaducts, Ribblehead is the most striking, longest and most famous of them all, whereas Smardale Viaduct is the highest.

Since around 1960, 35 signal boxes controlled the line, which has now been whittled down to nine. These are (from south to north); Settle Junction, Blea Moor, Garsdale, Kirkby Stephen, Appleby North Junction, Kirkby Thore, Culgaith, Low House, and Howe & Co's Siding. Geographically, the line only passes through two counties, North Yorkshire and Cumbria, with the county border for the two being passed when the line goes through Blea Moor Tunnel; however, the Yorkshire Dales National Park reached to a point just south of Ais Gill Summit, but the park's boundaries were extended in August 2016 and the park now reaches up to Crosby Garrett, and the railway forms a boundary with the park on its western side until just before Helm Tunnel.

== Infrastructure ==
Distances, mileage, chainage, and locational information is taken from Railway Track Diagrams Book 4: Midlands & North West. There may be disparities with measurements in other sources; IE, Little Viaduct is listed as being at 237 miles 67 chains (382.8 km) in Railway Track Diagrams, but Anderson and Fox state it is at 237 miles 68 chains (382.8 km). Similarly, Jackson's LMS railway signalling states every location to be one mile further than the track diagrams. The listings run from Settle towards Carlisle, which is the down direction, but this is in line with most sources on the subject.

Infrastructure of the Settle–Carlisle Line
Railway structure	Length	Distance from London (Note: Mileage is measured from London St Pancras via Cudworth and Keighley.)	Notes	Ref
Settle Junction signal box	N/A	233 miles 42 chains (375.8 km) (Note: The SCRCA listing gives the position of the signal box at 233 miles 47 chains (375.9 km).)	Opened in 1913, reframed in 1960. This is the third signal box to be built at this location.	
Settle Junction	N/A	233 miles 44 chains (375.9 km)	Bentham Line leaves here north-westwards; Settle–Carlisle line begins.	
Settle signal box	N/A	236 miles 37 chains (380.5 km)	Signal box was moved in 1997 thirteen years after decommissioning. The box is now grade II listed and is non-operational for the railway, but can be visited.	
Settle railway station	N/A	236 miles 40 chains (380.6 km)	Described as being the "best preserved" of the Settle–Carlisle Railway stations; the station buildings and platforms are grade II listed. The station is 510 feet (160 m) above sea level.	
Marshfield Viaduct	2 chains (130 ft; 40 m)	236 miles 50 chains (380.8 km)	Completed in 1871; four spans each 29 feet 9 inches (9.07 m).	
Church Viaduct	2 chains (130 ft; 40 m)	236 miles 60 chains (381 km)	Completed in 1871; six spans, five are 30 feet (9.1 m) across, with one being 37 feet 8 inches (11.48 m).	
Stainforth Tunnel	120 yards (110 m)	238 miles 54 chains (384.1 km)	Also known as Taitlands Tunnel	
Sheriff Brow Viaduct	58 yards (53 m)	239 miles 51 chains (385.7 km)	Also known as Sherwood Brow Viaduct, and Sherrard Brow.	
Little Viaduct	55 yards (50 m)	239 miles 67 chains (386 km)		
Helwith Bridge	N/A	240 miles 40 chains (387 km)	Road overbridge (Austwick Road) that crosses the railway and then the River Ribble (going westwards from the B7479. Was built as part of the Settle–Carlisle railway but does not generally appear in most books about the railway. Bridge is Grade II listed.	
Ribble Viaduct	174 feet (53 m)	240 miles 48 chains (387.2 km)	This is a smaller viaduct at Helwith Bridge; not to be confused with Ribblehead Viaduct. Viaduct is 55 feet (17 m) high.	
Arcow Quarry Junction	N/A	241 miles 20 chains (388.3 km)	North-facing connection to quarry site, installed in 2015. Trains leave northwards and run-round in Blea Moor Siding.	
Horton Quarry Junction	N/A	242 miles 37 chains (390.2 km)	Siding reconnected to Horton Quarry in 2025. Junction and siding only accessible from the down line.	
Horton-in-Ribblesdale railway station	N/A	242 miles 43 chains (390.3 km)	Station lies at 806 feet (246 m) above sea level; it closed in 1970, and re-opened in 1986.	
Ribblehead railway station down platform	N/A	247 miles 13 chains (397.8 km)	The down platform used to be directly opposite the up platform, but it was removed in 1974 to accommodate a new junction into Ribblehead Quarry. Northbound trains had to use the up platform until May 1993, when a new down platform was opened further south of the original.	
Ribblehead railway station up platform	N/A	247 miles 20 chains (397.9 km)	Station lies at 1,025 feet (312 m) above sea level.	
Ribblehead Quarry Junction	N/A	247 miles 22 chains (398 km)	Junction and siding only accessible from the down line.	
Ribblehead Viaduct	440 yards (400 m)	247 miles 40 chains (398.3 km)	Also known as Batty Moss Viaduct; grade II* listed. The line across the viaduct was singled in 1985 as a cost measure.	
Blea Moor Siding	27 chains (1,800 ft; 540 m)	248 miles 28 chains (399.7 km)	Loaded stone trains from Arcow, Horton, or Ribblehead, (Note: Ribblehead has been a loading point for stone quarried from Ingleton Quarry. It is brought to the siding in lorries and then railed out. Additionally, in the early part of the 21st-century, timber was loaded at Ribblehead and used Blea Moor to run-round.) run-round at Blea Moor siding to head south.	
Blea Moor signal box	N/A	248 miles 39 chains (399.9 km)	The box was built in 1941 and is known to be a remote location.	
Force Gill Aqueduct	N/A	249 miles 14 chains (401 km)	Aqueduct constructed to carry Force Gill over the railway. Lies just to the south of the southern portal of Blea Moor Tunnel.	
Blea Moor Tunnel	1.494 miles (2.404 km)	249 miles 25 chains (401.2 km)	The tunnel is the longest on the line, almost twice the length of the next longest tunnel, Rise Hill. The tunnel has a height above sea level of 1,151 feet (351 m).	
Dent Head Viaduct	199 yards (182 m)	251 miles 12 chains (404.2 km)	Grade II listed.	
Arten Gill Viaduct	220 yards (200 m)	252 miles 17 chains (405.9 km)	Viaduct is 117 feet (36 m) above Arten Gill and is made of Dent Marble. Grade II listed.	
Dent railway station	N/A	253 miles 52 chains (408.2 km)	At 1,156 feet (352 m), Dent is the highest mainline station in England.	
Rise Hill Tunnel	1,213 yards (1,109 m)	254 miles 11 chains (409 km)	Also known as Black Moss, Cowgill or Risehill Tunnel.	
Garsdale railway station	N/A	256 miles 53 chains (413.1 km)	The station was an oddity in comparison to other stations on the line as it did not have a stationmaster's house or station building; those functions were retained for Hawes, with Garsdale remaining purely a junction station. The station is 1,100 feet (340 m) above sea level, and was the de-facto summit of the Wensleydale Line.	
Garsdale signal box	N/A	256 miles 55 chains (413.1 km)	The signal box is located on the down platform (Carlisle-bound direction [north]). It is grade II listed building which was installed in 1910. It is the only listed signal box on the line.	
Dandry Mire Viaduct	11 chains (730 ft; 220 m)	257 miles (414 km)	Also known as either Garsdale or Moorcock Viaduct. Originally, the intent was to build and embankment here, but the boggy ground kept on swallowing the earth that was tipped there, necessitating a viaduct to be built instead. Grade II listed.	
Moorcock Tunnel	98 yards (90 m)	257 miles 39 chains (414.4 km)		
Lunds Viaduct	103 yards (94 m)	257 miles 54 chains (414.7 km)		
Shotlock Hill Tunnel	106 yards (97 m)	258 miles 38 chains (416 km)		
Ais Gill Summit	N/A	259 miles 57 chains (418 km)	The summit is at 1,169 feet (356 m) above sea level, (Note: The height of the summit varies in citations; an official Midland Railway map of the line states the height to be 1,166 feet (355 m).) and was the highest summit on the Midland Railway, and it remains the highest open mainline railway summit in England.	
Ais Gill Viaduct	3 chains (200 ft; 60 m)	260 miles 53 chains (419.5 km)	Viaduct has four 45 feet (14 m) spans and is 75 feet (23 m) high.	
Birkett Tunnel	424 yards (388 m)	264 miles 23 chains (425.3 km)	Often named as the third longest tunnel on the line; but Culgaith and Helm tunnels (see below) are demonstrably longer. When excavated, shale, limestone, grit, slate, iron ore, coal and lead ore were discovered.	
Kirkby Stephen signal box	N/A	266 miles 40 chains (428.9 km)	This was installed in 1974 to a British Rail flat-topped design, which has been described as "not the most appealing on the network."	
Kirkby Stephen railway station	N/A	266 miles 47 chains (429 km)	Station is 860 feet (260 m) above sea level.	
Smardale Viaduct	237 yards (217 m)	268 miles 49 chains (432.3 km)	Viaduct has 12 spans, is 131 feet (40 m) high, and carries the railway over the former NER line to Tebay and Scandal Beck. It is the highest above ground viaduct on the railway.	
Crosby Garett Tunnel	181 yards (166 m)	269 miles (433 km)		
Crosby Garrett Viaduct	5 chains (330 ft; 100 m)	269 miles 35 chains (433.6 km)	The viaduct is grade II listed.	
Crosby Garrett railway station	N/A	269 miles 60 chains (434.1 km)	The station closed on 5 October 1952.	
Griseburn Viaduct	142 yards (130 m)	271 miles 53 chains (437.2 km)		
Helm Tunnel	571 yards (522 m)	273 miles 13 chains (439.6 km)		>
Ormside railway station	N/A	274 miles 60 chains (442.2 km)	The station closed on 8 March 1960	
Ormside Viaduct	200 yards (180 m)	275 miles 20 chains (443 km)	Viaduct is 90 feet (27 m) high.	
Appleby railway station	N/A	277 miles 22 chains (446.2 km)	The station buildings on the west and east platforms, and the footbridge, are all grade II listed. Station is 525 feet (160 m) above sea level.	
Appleby North Junction	N/A	277 miles 27 chains (446.3 km)	Provides a connection to the Eden Valley Railway.	
Appleby North Junction signal box	N/A	277 miles 34 chains (446.5 km)	Built in 1951 to an LMS design.	
A66 bridge	N/A	277 miles 76 chains (447.3 km)	Installed in the late 1970s/early 1980s for the A66 when it bypassed Appleby. The A66 road runs on the formation of the old NER line to Penrith (The Eden Valley Line), so a bridge was here before the road was built.	
Long Marton Viaduct	108 yards (99 m)	279 miles 67 chains (450.4 km)		
Long Marton railway station	N/A	280 miles 15 chains (450.9 km)	Station closed in May 1970	
New Biggin gypsum siding.	38 chains (2,500 ft; 760 m)	281 miles 47 chains (453.2 km)		
Kirkby Thore signal box	N/A	282 miles 2 chains (453.9 km)	The box is two portacabins laid on top of each other, and was installed in 1994.	
New Biggin railway station	N/A	283 miles 28 chains (456 km)	Station closed on 4 May 1970.	
Crowdundle Viaduct	86 yards (79 m)	283 miles 64 chains (456.7 km)	Also known as New Biggin Viaduct; is 55 feet (17 m) above ground.	
Culgaith signal box	N/A	284 miles 55 chains (458.2 km)	Installed in 1908.	
Culgaith level crossing	N/A	284 miles 56 chains (458.2 km)	Crossing is an MCB, and is one of only two road level crossings on the whole line, the other being at Low House.	
Culgaith railway station	N/A	284 miles 60 chains (458.3 km)	Opened in 1880, fours years after the line, so the station buildings do not have the same architecture as the other stations on the line; the rest of the stations were designed by John Holloway Sanders. It closed in May 1970.	
Culgaith Tunnel	661 yards (604 m)	284 miles 78 chains (458.6 km)		
Waste Bank Tunnel	164 yards (150 m)	285 miles 48 chains (459.6 km)		
Langwathby railway station	N/A	288 miles 23 chains (464 km)	Station is 462 feet (141 m) above sea level.	
Little Salkeld Viaduct	134 yards (123 m)	289 miles 35 chains (465.8 km)	Grade II listed; also known as Dodds Mill Viaduct.	
Little Salkeld railway station	N/A	289 miles 56 chains (466.2 km)	Closed on 4 May 1970.	
Long Meg Viaduct	137 yards (125 m)	291 miles 6 chains (468.4 km)	Also known as Eden Lacy Viaduct.	
Lazonby Tunnel	99 yards (91 m)	292 miles 25 yards (469.951 km)		
Lazonby and Kirkoswald railway station	N/A	292 miles 50 chains (470.9 km)	Station is 300 feet (91 m) above sea level.	
Baron Wood Tunnel (No. 1)	207 yards (189 m)	295 miles 42 chains (475.6 km)		
Baron Wood Tunnel (No. 2)	252 yards (230 m)	295 miles 55 chains (475.9 km)		
Armathwaite Tunnel	325 yards (297 m)	296 miles 51 chains (477.4 km)		
Armathwaite Viaduct	176 yards (161 m)	297 miles 23 chains (478.4 km)	Viaduct is grade II listed, and is 80 feet (24 m) above ground.	
Armathwaite railway station	N/A	298 miles 9 chains (479.8 km)		
Armathwaite Signal Box	N/A	298 miles 16 chains (479.9 km)	Signal box is now a museum and is non-operational for the railway; it is owned by Network Rail, but leased to the Friends of the Settle-Carlisle Line.	
Dry Beck Viaduct	139 yards (127 m)	299 miles 6 chains (481.3 km)	Seven-arch viaduct; was grade II listed, but was de-listed by Historic England in 2016.	
Low House Crossing and signal box	N/A	299 miles 55 chains (482.3 km)	Signal box was installed in 1900; crossing is an MCB (manually controlled barriers).	
Cotehill Viaduct	91 yards (83 m)	301 miles 2 chains (484.5 km)	Also known as High Stand Gill Viaduct, and is 60 feet (18 m) above ground.	
Cotehill railway station.	N/A	301 miles 20 chains (484.8 km)	Station closed on 7 April 1952.	
Howe & Co. siding signal box	N/A	302 miles 68 chains (487.4 km)	Installed in 1916; siding on down side is out of use.	
Cumwhinton railway station	N/A	304 miles 12 chains (489.5 km)	Closed in November 1956.	
Scotby railway station	N/A	305 miles 28 chains (491.4 km)	Closed in February 1942.	
Durranhill sidings and engine shed	N/A	306 miles 40 chains (493.3 km)	A fan of goods sidings and an engine shed which operated until 1959.	
Petterill Bridge Junction	N/A	307 miles 12 chains (494.3 km)	Official end of railway as built; continues into Carlisle on former NER railway track.	
Carlisle railway station	N/A	N/A	Station lies 1-mile (1.6 km) beyond Petterill Bridge Junction.	

Trackmaps state that the distance from Settle Junction (233 miles 44 chains (375.9 km)) to Petterill Bridge Junction (307 miles 12 chains (494.3 km)), is 73 miles 58 chains (118.6 km). Historical infrastructure included the water troughs at Garsdale, often cited as being the highest main-line water-troughs in the world, and the old engine shed and turntable, also at Garsdale. The water troughs at Garsdale were said to be the only place between Settle and Carlisle with a section of level track long enough to support the water troughs. The Midland Railway also built an engine shed at Durran Hill at Carlisle beside the Settle-Carlisle running lines, to provide motive power for the railway. The Midland railway also had an engine shed located at Hellifield, which was south of Settle Junction.

Additionally; many of the bridges on the railway are also listed structures.

== Hawes branch Infrastructure ==
Hawes Stourton Hellfield RJD 69

Various distances exist for the branch; Welbourn states the branch to be 5 3/4 miles (9.3 km), whereas the junction diagram as published by the Railway Clearing House in 1914, states the branch to be 5 miles 75 chains (9.6 km). Other sources state it to be 6 miles (9.7 km). Garsdale railway station was originally called Hawes Junction, then later was renamed to Hawes Junction and Garsdale, simply becoming just Garsdale on 1 September 1932.

Besides the joint station, both companies had running powers over the other lines; the NER had the right to run as far as Settle, though they only ran trains as far as Hawes Junction, whereas the MR did exercise their rights over the NER line as far as Leyburn, but only with excursion trains. The branch was started some time after the main efforts began on the Settle-Carlisle line and building the line was not as easy as first thought leading to a change of route in places. The extra engineering effort meant that the final cost was £40,000 per mile. The conservation area only applies to the existing railway, and so consequently does not apply to the Hawes branch. Only Appersett Viaduct is listed.

The trackbed is largely intact, and whilst there have been proposals to re-open the railway, in 2025, "formal steps" were taken to create a accessible trail out of the old trackbed to connect Hawes with Garsdale railway station.

Infrastructure of the Hawes branch
Railway structure	Length	Distance from London	Notes	Ref
Garsdale railway station (Hawes Junction)	N/A	256 miles 53 chains (413.1 km)		
Mossdale Tunnel	246 yards (225 m) (Note: Biddle states the tunnel is 245 yards (224 m).)	258 miles 66 chains (416.5 km)	Post-closure, the tunnel was used as a waterproof shelter for straw by local farmers.	
Mossdale Viaduct	78 yards (71 m)	259 miles 19 chains (417.2 km)	Built in stone with four arches; crosses Mossdale Gill	
Appersett Viaduct	108 yards (99 m)	261 miles 26 chains (420.6 km)	Built in stone with five arches; crosses Widdale Beck. Bridge is grade II listed.	
Hawes railway station	N/A	262 miles 60 chains (422.9 km) (Note: Milepost 262 is just east of Hawes station where the railway goes over Bridge Number 39.)	Operated as a joint station between the NER (later LNER) and the Midland Railway (later the LMS).	

== See also ==
- Infrastructure of the Brill Tramway
- Infrastructure of the East Coast Main Line
