= Lunds Viaduct =

Railway viaduct in Yorkshire, England

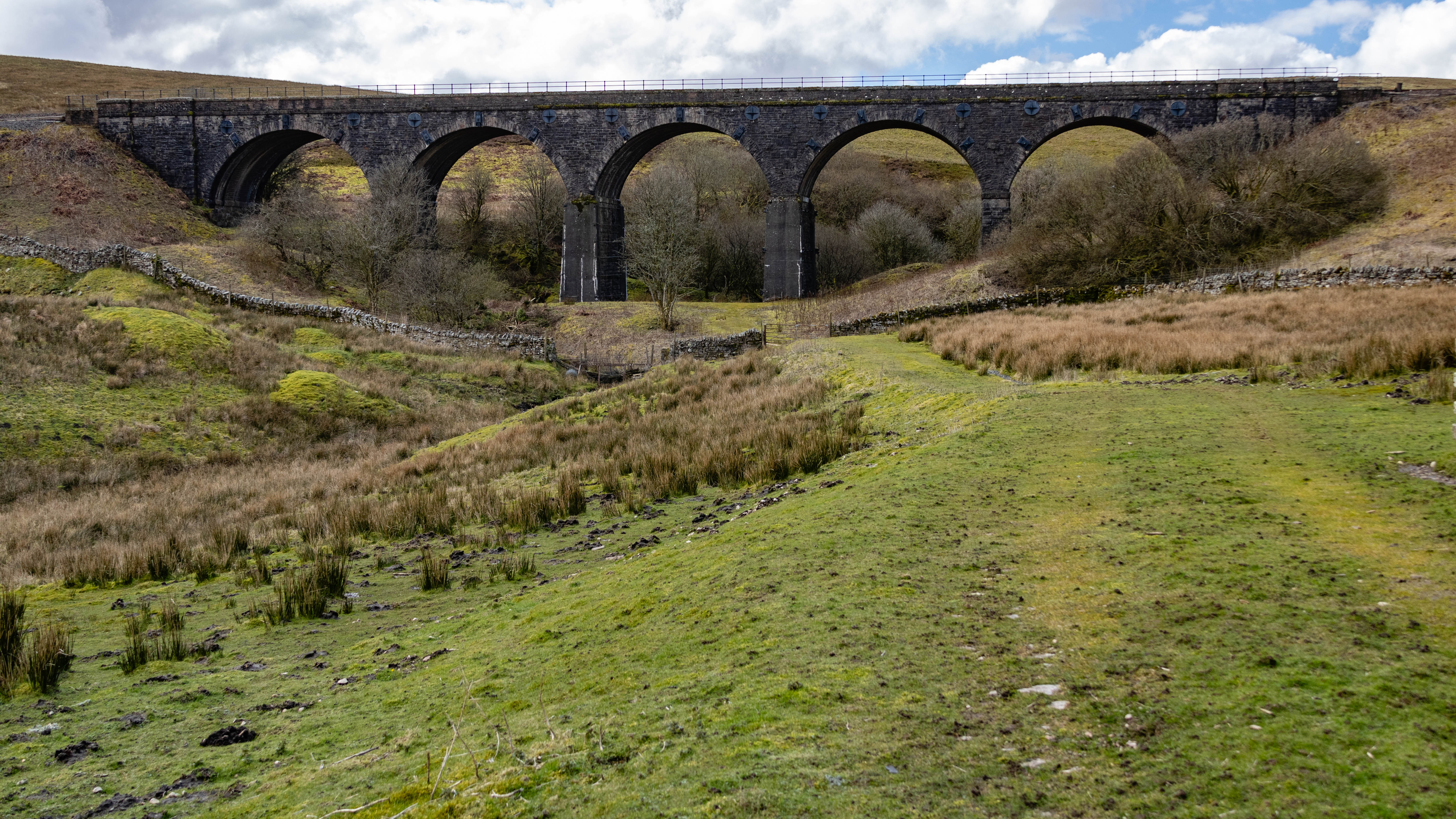
- Coordinates: 54.3342°N 2.3207°W
- OS grid reference: SD792393
- Carries: Settle–Carlisle line
- Crosses: South Lunds Sike
- Locale: High Abbotside, North Yorkshire, England
- Named for: Lunds hamlet
- Owner: Network Rail

Characteristics
- Total length: 5 chains (330 ft; 100 m) (Note: Chains is the measurement used by the railway engineers in the 19th century, and still in use today on Network Rail.)
- Width: 45 feet (14 m)
- Height: 63 feet (19 m)
- No. of spans: 5

Rail characteristics
- No. of tracks: 2
- Track gauge: 4 ft 8 1/2 in (1,435 mm) standard gauge

History
- Architect: John Sydney Crossley
- Constructed by: Benton & Woodiwiss
- Construction start: 2 April 1874
- Construction end: July 1875
- Opened: August 1875

Location
- Interactive map of Lunds Viaduct

Lunds Viaduct is a five-arch railway bridge in North Yorkshire, England. The viaduct was built for the Midland Railway and carries the Settle to Carlisle railway line over South Lunds Sike, being named after the fell and hamlet of Lunds, just to the east. Work started on the viaduct in April 1874, and it was completed by July 1875, with the line opening for traffic in August 1875. Initial workings over the line were on a single track, but this had been doubled by October 1875. Just to the north of the viaduct was the point of the collision of the Hawes Junction rail crash.

== History ==
Work on Lunds Viaduct began on 2 April 1874 as part of contract No.2 from Dent Head Viaduct to Smardale Viaduct. The viaduct is 1,000 feet (300 m) above sea level, 63 feet (19 m) above the floor of the valley, 45 feet (14 m) in width, and carries the Settle Carlisle Railway over the South Lunds Sike watercourse. The viaduct was originally in the West Riding of Yorkshire, but since 1974, it has been in North Yorkshire. Partly underneath the viaduct are the remains of a quarry which was used to provide stone for the many stone structures along this stretch of the line. The viaduct is 5 chains (330 ft; 100 m) (Note: Some documents express this as 193 yards (176 m).) long and starts just after the 257.75-mile (414.81 km) marker (milepost) as measured from London St Pancras northwards; this is 23 miles (37 km) north of Settle Junction, and 50 miles (80 km) south of Carlisle railway station. It is on a rising gradient from 1 in 165 to 1 in 300 northwards between Moorcock Tunnel and Shotlock Hill Tunnel.

The viaduct has five arches; each are 45 feet (14 m) across, and the undersides are made from bricks which were brought in from Bradford. Both Dandry Mire and Lunds viaduct were given over to brickwork to release stone masons for work elsewhere such as Arten Gill Viaduct. Work finished on the arches in June 1875 and the parapet was completed in the following month. The name of the viaduct is taken from Lunds Fell and Lunds hamlet, which are just to the east of the viaduct in Upper Wensleydale. The first services to use the line over the viaduct were freight trains, initially over a single line (double line working was achieved on 4 October 1875); passenger traffic first used the line in May 1876.

In 1880, the contractors for section 2 of the line, Benton & Woodiwiss, sued the Midland Railway for £40,000 (equivalent to £4,160,000 in 2025) which they say had been incurred by the extra work in building Dandry Mire Viaduct which was intended to be an embankment, but because of the poor state of the land below, it necessary to covert the formation into a viaduct. This delayed them considerably in moving on to other structures such as Lunds Viaduct, and then wages rose causing them further loss of money and a later date of finishing their section of the railway.

In December 1910, the Hawes Junction rail crash occurred just to the north of Lunds Viaduct. The viaduct is not a listed structure unlike most other named viaducts on the line, but it is within the Yorkshire Dales National Park, and it does form part of the Yorkshire Dales National Park Settle-Carlisle Railway conservation area appraisal. This states that "Lunds Viaduct; despite being less impressive than the preceding viaducts along the line....forms part of that sequence and has some landmark quality in its natural setting." Work on waterproofing and repairing the viaduct was carried out in 2006 as part of an £80 million upgrade to the Settle Carlisle Line.

== See also ==
- Infrastructure of the Settle–Carlisle line
