= Ais Gill Summit =

Railway summit in England

Train at Ais Gill summit

Ais Gill Summit is a railway summit on the Settle–Carlisle line in Northern England. The high point of the railway also marks the county boundary between Cumbria and North Yorkshire. At 1,169 feet (356 m) above sea level, it is the highest mainline railway summit in England that is still in use. (Note: There are summits on the freight only lines at Buxton which are higher; Ais Gill is often referred to as the highest mainline summit in Great Britain, but the summit is lower than those on the Highland Main Line.) The summit is roughly one-third of the way from Settle Junction, and two-thirds of the way south from Carlisle. The uphill gradients from both ends of the line towards the summit at Ais Gill are traditionally known as the Long Drag.

== History ==
Ais Gill Summit

The railway infrastructure at Ais Gill included a signal box and a lie-by siding on each side of the line. The signal box, which was installed in April 1890, remained in use until January 1981, and it was later moved to the Butterley Railway Centre in Derby in 1982/1983. The Aisgill Moor Cottages were also built by the Midland Railway to house their workers (signallers, platelayers, etc) along this part of the line. The current signs at Ais Gill designating the summit were installed by British rail in 1953, but signs indicating a summit predate these, but it is not known when they were first placed there. In the Midland Railway era, expresses were piloted or banked up to Ais Gill and the second locomotive would be removed at the summit, then run back to Garsdale where it could be turned on the turntable. Whilst it is not exactly known, it is thought that the lie-by sidings were last used to lay-over banking engines in the winter of 1963.

Although two railway accidents are named as being at Ais Gill (in 1913 and 1995), neither were actually at the summit, being 0.5-mile (0.80 km) and 1 mile 54 chains (2.7 km) north of Ais Gill summit itself respectively. Ais Gill is the common usage in railway maps and diagrams, but the Ordnance Survey Maps detail the area as Aisgill.

From Settle Junction, the railway climbs all the way northwards to the summit at Ais Gill, the last section being a 1-in-165 from Lunds Viaduct before a shallower gradient of 1-in-320 to reach the summit. Ais Gill, which is 1,169 feet (356 m) above sea level, (Note: The original map as drawn up by the Midland Railway in the 1870s details the summit to be 1,166 feet (355 m). Other sources state the height above sea level to be 1,167 feet (356 m).) is often referred to as the highest mainline summit in England; other closed, but not mainline railways, have reached higher than this (such as Stainmore Summit at 1,370 feet (420 m), and Bolts Law at 1,670 feet (510 m), but the freight-only line near Buxton which is still open, has a higher summit. Thereafter, if travelling northwards over Ais Gill, the gradient is a steady 1-in-100 downhill to Ormside viaduct. The summit is 3 miles (5 km) north of Garsdale railway station, and 14 miles (23 km) south of Ormside Viaduct. Ais Gill summit is one third of the journey northwards on the line, being 24.5 miles (39.4 km) north of Settle Junction, and 48 miles (77 km) south of Carlisle. The engine drivers and firemen who worked on the railway named the ascent from either side as the Long Drag, though this is most commonly used to refer to the 1-in-100 stretch from Settle Junction to Blea Moor, and then on to Ais Gill.

== See also ==
- Infrastructure of the Settle–Carlisle line
