= Mossdale Viaduct =

Viaduct in North Yorkshire, England

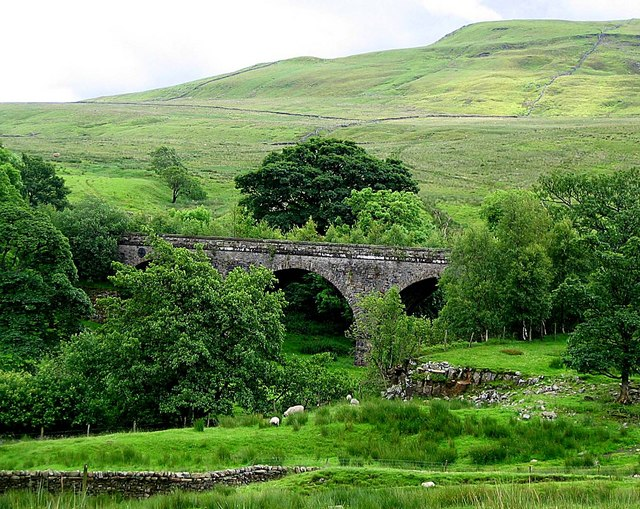
- Mossdale Railway Viaduct
- Coordinates: 54.3217°N 2.2678°W
- OS grid reference: SD826918
- Crosses: Mossdale Gill
- Locale: Hawes civil parish, North Yorkshire, England
- Official name: Bridge 12
- Other name(s): Moss Dale Gill Viaduct; Moss Dale Head Viaduct
- Named for: Mossdale Gill

Characteristics
- Total length: 78 yards (71 m)
- Height: 40 feet (12 m)

Rail characteristics
- No. of tracks: 1

History
- Construction start: June 1876
- Construction end: February 1878
- Opened: 1 October 1878 (official)
- Closed: March 1959

Location
- Interactive map of Mossdale Viaduct

Mossdale Viaduct is a disused railway bridge in Wensleydale, North Yorkshire, England. It was opened by the Midland Railway in 1878 as part of their Hawes branch line, later becoming part of the Wensleydale Railway between Garsdale and Northallerton. The viaduct straddles Mossdale Gill, a tributary of the River Ure, from which it is named, and the view of the gill as it tumbles over the falls at the foot of the viaduct was one of the notable scenes on the line. Services along this section of the line ceased in 1959.

== History ==
Construction started on the viaduct in June 1876 with quarries located at SD827918 providing the limestone and sandstone needed to build the viaduct. The viaduct was complete by February of 1878, and it was opened to goods traffic on 1 August 1878, with passenger services starting nominally five days later; however, a dispute between the Midland Railway and the NER about the joint station at Hawes meant traffic did not start officially until 1 October 1878. The viaduct is 78 yards (71 m) long, 40 feet (12 m) high, and has four arches. It was one of three significant engineering structures on the section of line between Garsdale and Hawes; the other two being Mossdale Tunnel and Appersett Viaduct. The branch was built as part of Contract No.5 from Hawes Junction station to Hawes itself, and the line opened three years after the main line between Settle and Carlisle. The engineers for the line were Crossley and Story, but records also indicate Benton and Woodiwiss, who undertook many of the works on the Settle–Carlisle line, were actually the resident engineers. Work on the viaduct was delayed due to severe weather in January 1877, flooding and saturating the land. Only the month before (December 1876) bad weather caused the second arch of the viaduct to collapse, (Note: Which arch was the second is not given; ie - from the Garsdale direction, or from the Hawes direction.) injuring three men, one of them fatally. The man, a stone mason, was injured by timber and falling stones on the 9 December, dying on the 16 of December.

Both passenger and goods services between Hawes and Garsdale were stopped in March 1959, and the line between the two stations closed. It was re-opened as temporary measure during a period of bad weather in December 1963 to provide transport in and out of Hawes, but it was then closed again soon afterwards and the track was lifted. A record shows that the line was taken out of use on 8 December 1963.

When viewing the viaduct from the public footpath to the north, the Lower Mossdale Falls on Mossdale Gill are framed within one of the arches of the viaduct, as the stream winds its way underneath the viaduct to the River Ure to the north. When the line opened, it was commented upon that after leaving the gloom of Mossdale Tunnel, Mossdale Gill Falls offered a "breath-taking sight".

The viaduct has been the subject of re-opening proposals, both for a resurgent railway, and as a cycle and footpath. It has various types of bushes and plants growing out of the stonework, and it is acknowledged that any re-opening would require the vegetation to be removed.

The viaduct is known variously as Mossdale Viaduct, Moss Dale Viaduct, Moss Dale Gill Viaduct, and Mossdale Head Viaduct. A map prepared by the Midland Railway in 1913 shows it as Moss Dale Gill Viaduct (bridge no. 12) at 259 miles 19 chains (417.2 km) north of London St Pancras. The bridge numbering system started at Garsdale, and extended eastwards towards Hawes. On the former 5.5-mile (9 km) branch from Garsdale, the viaduct is at the 2.5-mile (4 km) point.

== See also ==
- Arten Gill Viaduct
- Dandry Mire Viaduct
- Dent Head Viaduct
- Ribblehead Viaduct
