= Long Preston railway station =

Railway station in North Yorkshire, England

Long Preston
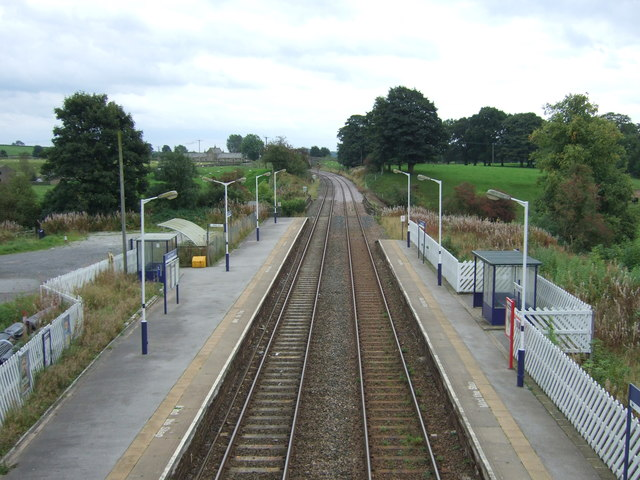

General information
- Location: Long Preston, North Yorkshire; England
- Coordinates: 54°01′00″N 2°15′19″W
- Grid reference: SD833579
- Owner: Network Rail
- Manager: Northern Trains
- Platforms: 2
- Tracks: 2

Other information
- Station code: LPR
- Classification: DfT category F2

History
- Original company: "Little" North Western Railway
- Pre-grouping: Midland Railway
- Post-grouping: London, Midland and Scottish Railway; British Rail (London Midland Region)

Key dates
- 30 July 1849: Opened

Passengers
- 2021/22: ▲8,974
- 2022/23: ▲14,042
- 2023/24: ▲14,232
- 2024/25: ▲18,214
- Interchange: 460
- 2025/26: ▲19,794
- Interchange: ▲614
Location
- Location within North Yorkshire
Notes
- Passenger statistics from the Office of Rail and Road

Long Preston is a railway station on the Bentham Line, which runs between Leeds and Morecambe via Skipton. The station, situated 37 1/2 miles (60 km) north-west of Leeds, serves the village of Long Preston in North Yorkshire. It is owned by Network Rail and managed by Northern Trains.

Heading west, it is the last station before the Bentham Line and Settle and Carlisle Line diverge at Settle Junction, situated to the north of the village.

== History ==
The station was opened on 30 July 1849 by the "Little" North Western Railway. It was later taken over by the Midland Railway.

== Facilities ==
Facilities at the station are somewhat basic. The original wooden station buildings were demolished in the early 1970s, and there are now just simple waiting shelters on each platform. There is an operational help point to obtain timetable information or emergency assistance as well as a telephone which direct dials to the signaller which can be used for train running information. There is also a small car park.

The station is unstaffed, but a ticket machine was installed in 2019 to allow travellers to buy tickets before travelling. There is level access to the southbound platform only - the opposite side has a ramp, but this is quite steep and is not recommended for use by disabled travellers. Train running information is provided by telephone, customer information screens and timetable posters.

== Services ==
Generally, there is a train at least every two hours from Long Preston southbound towards Leeds (thirteen departures per day in total) and northbound. All services from Leeds to Lancaster (eight per day) stop there, along with four Leeds to Carlisle trains. There is also one train each day that runs north only as far as Ribblehead, whilst five Lancaster trains continue to Morecambe and the last southbound train terminates at Skipton.

For many years on Sundays, only Leeds-Morecambe trains stopped at Long Preston. However, since 2009, certain Carlisle trains have also served the station on Sundays. As a result, there are now five trains to Lancaster/Morecambe and two to Carlisle northbound and nine trains to Leeds southbound (the two morning/early afternoon services on the Morecambe line that formerly ran in summer only up until 2010 now run throughout the year). The station also now has an afternoon departure that runs through to Sheffield and Nottingham.

== Sources ==
- Bairstow, M. (2000), The 'Little' North Western Railway, Martin Bairstow, Leeds, ISBN 1-871944-21-X

Preceding station	National Rail	Following station
Hellifield	Northern Trains; Leeds–Morecambe line	Giggleswick
Hellifield	Northern Trains; Settle–Carlisle line	Settle
	Historical railways	
Hellifield	Midland Railway "Little" North Western Railway	Settle Junction
