= Ais Gill rail accident =

Ais Gill rail accident may refer to:

- 1913 Ais Gill rail accident
- 1995 Ais Gill rail accident
