= Garsdale water troughs =

Railway infrastructure in England

The train is passing the site of the water troughs

Garsdale water troughs (also known as Hawes water troughs) were two parallel water troughs set into the railway line between Dent and Garsdale on the Settle–Carlisle line, in the West Riding of Yorkshire, England. (Note: The troughs were in use between 1907 and 1968; at that point, the area was in the West Riding of Yorkshire, being moved into Cumbria in 1974.) The troughs, which were installed by the Midland Railway in 1907 on a level stretch of track at about 1,100 feet (340 m) above sea level, were noted as being the highest in England, and often quoted as being the highest in the world. The toughs enabled passing steam trains to take on water by a scoop that was lowered into the troughs, which meant the train did not have to stop at wayside stations to take on water. They were removed in 1968 with the end of regular mainline steam locomotive use on British Railways.

== History ==
The water troughs were built in 1907 by the Midland Railway to enable passing trains to collect water without stopping on the Settle–Carlisle line, thus improving transit times along the line. A second positive for the railway was that it obviated the need to use locomotives with larger tenders, which to provide for an unbroken 86-mile (138 km) run without stopping, the capacity of the tenders was 3,250 imperial gallons (14,800 L; 3,900 US gal) as opposed to an average of 2,800 imperial gallons (13,000 L; 3,400 US gal) on a standard steam locomotive type normally used by the Midland railway. The water troughs were one of five locations on the Midland Railway network where water could be taken on without stopping, and they were roughly halfway between Leeds and Carlisle. (Note: The other four locations were Oakley, Melton Mowbray, Loughborough and Tamworth. Southwards to the next water troughs was 144 miles (232 km) (Loughborough), and northwards it was 60 miles (97 km) to the troughs at Floriston/Gretna.) A temporary light railway was laid across the adjacent eastwards hill from the trackbed of the railway so that the water from Cote Gill could be impounded into a reservoir, which would in turn feed a tank beside the railway lines. The cost for the troughs and the 43,000-litre (9,500 imp gal; 11,000 US gal) tank came to £4,396 (equivalent to £457,000 in 2025). An additional cost of £1,707 was incurred in fitting steam engines with the scoops and pipework necessary to enable taking water on without stopping. Passing trains would lower a scoop, which entered into the trough and allowed the locomotive to take on 2,000 imperial gallons (9,100 L; 2,400 US gal) in one go.

The water was moved from the tank structure into the troughs by gravitation, which was regulated by a float device. In winter, the water in the tank was kept heated by use of a boiler in the tank house which required constant staffing to maintain a fire under the boiler; this prevented the pipes icing up. The troughs were located between 255 miles 63 chains (411.7 km) and 256 miles 8 chains (412.2 km) (a distance of 25 chains (1,600 ft; 500 m)), as measured from London St Pancras. The troughs were constructed of wood on the outside and equally were 1,670 feet (510 m) long, 6 inches (150 mm) deep for holding water, and each had a capacity of 5,000–6,000 imperial gallons (23,000–27,000 L; 6,000–7,200 US gal). Each trough was lined with galvanized steel which was formed from 167 lengths, each being 10-foot (3 m) long. Like the pipes and the tank house, the troughs were also steam-heated to prevent frost build-up, but the steam pipes were later removed. A workers gang had to be employed in winter to remove ice from the troughs, otherwise it was feared that the expanding ice would rise above rail level and derail trains. This did happen in the great snow of 1947, when a locomotive and snow plough were derailed on the troughs, and later still, two other locomotives became stuck on the protruding ice. This occurred again during the big freeze of January 1963.

The troughs became redundant when the use of steam locomotives was phased out on British Rail in 1968. The troughs were regularly listed as being the highest in England (or Britain), being at a height of around 1,100 feet (340 m), and sometimes as being the highest in the world.

== See also ==
- Infrastructure of the Settle–Carlisle line
