= Force Gill Beck =

Watercourse in North Yorkshire, England

Force Gill Force Gill Beck
- The aqueduct carrying Force Gill

- Location within North Yorkshire
- Etymology: Waterfall ravine

Location
- Country: England
- County: North Yorkshire

Physical characteristics
- Source
  - location: Greensett Tarn
  - coordinates: 54.2361°N 2.3881°W
  - elevation: 550 metres (1,800 ft)
- Mouth
  - coordinates: 54.2280°N 2.3681°W

Basin features
- River system: River Lune
- Waterfalls: High Force; Force Gill Force

Force Gill (or sometimes Force Gill Beck) is a small upland beck in North Yorkshire, England, which feeds into Winterscales Beck, then the River Doe, and the Greta to enter the Irish Sea via the River Lune. The beck is noted for its waterfalls, (the name Force Gill derives from Old Norse meaning waterfall ravine) and its aqueduct which carries the beck over the Settle-Carlisle Railway. There is a pathway on the northern side of the aqueduct adjacent to the beck.

== Force Gill ==
Force Gill, or Force Gill Beck, is partially fed by springs, and waters exiting Greensett Tarn on the slopes of Whernside. Some water from Greensett Tarn disappears underground and is thought to be that which rises in the caves at the top of Force Gill at a height of 550 metres (1,800 ft) above sea level. The beck is channelled eastwards on an aqueduct over the railway, only to join with Little Beck and then flow westwards back underneath the railway. Little Beck becomes Winterscales Beck, then the River Doe, thereafter the River Greta, and flows through Ingleton, eventually into the River Lune. Some sources state that the beck feeds into the Ribble, but this is a common misunderstanding.

The bridge that carries the beck over the Settle–Carlisle Railway line is grade II listed and also doubles as a walkers' bridge, carrying the Dales High Way. The aqueduct is 200 yards (180 m) south of Blea Moor Tunnel, and it goes over the railway from north west to south east, having a u-shaped, curved bed composed of stones, laid on a bed of tar, with eight stepped drops as it travels over the railway. In the building phase of the railway, Force Gill was a problem for the workers as it washed away temporary bridges and flooded quarries in the locality that were being used as sources of stone for the railway. The small tunnel that takes the railway under the beck is 30 metres (100 ft) long. There has been some suggestion that the bridge also carried a tramway to take limestone from where it was quarried in Force Gill to the railway line for Ribblehead Viaduct, or shale to be added to clay for brick-making.

== Waterfalls ==
Force Gill Force

Water in Force Gill travels over several waterfalls, but the two most notable are the upper waterfall (at SD754822 and labelled as High Force on Ordnance Survey mapping) and the lower waterfall (at SD758819) which is often referred to as Force Gill Force. The two waterfalls are part of the stepped landscape in the area, which has alternating sandstone and limestone outcrops, with the lower waterfall falling into an "amphitheatre surrounded by sheer cliffs", which has led to comparison to nearby Hardraw Force waterfall in Wensleydale. The upper falls have a less vertical drop than the lower falls. Crystal states that Force Gill Force has a drop of about 6 metres (20 ft); others claim the fall is closer to 16 metres (52 ft). The waterfalls can be seen on the walk from Ribblehead to Dentdale or Whernside. The falls at Force Gill are recognised by the Yorkshire Dales National Park Authority as being '"spectacular", an association they share with other falls in the area such as Thornton and Pecca Falls further down the valley.

The name Force Gill derives from Old Norse meaning "waterfall ravine", the name first being printed on mapping in 1858. The watercourse is sometimes known as Force Beck. In his book Land of the Lune, John Self rates Force Gill Force at number six in his top ten of waterfalls in the Lune catchment area. Alfred Wainwright describes them as "fine... which would earn an admiring patronage if they were better known", and John Gillham describes both waterfalls as "exquisite".
