= New Biggin railway station =

Former railway station in Cumbria, England

New Biggin

General information
- Location: Newbiggin, Westmorland and Furness; England
- Coordinates: 54.647425°N 2.576507°W
- Grid reference: NY628281
- Platforms: 2

Other information
- Status: Disused

History
- Original company: Midland Railway
- Post-grouping: London Midland and Scottish Railway

Key dates
- 1 May 1876: Opened
- 4 May 1970: Station closed
Location

New Biggin or Newbiggin was a railway station which served the village of Newbiggin near Kirkby Thore in Newbiggin parish, Cumbria, England. It was located on the Settle-Carlisle Line, 24 3/4 miles (39.8 km) south of Carlisle. Whilst the station is now disused, the line is still operational and the nearest open station is Appleby.

== History ==
It was built by the Midland Railway and opened on 1 May 1876. The station was designed by the Midland Railway company architect John Holloway Sanders.

The station was closed on 4 May 1970 (when the local service over the line was withdrawn by British Rail) and the disused platforms subsequently demolished. The station building on the eastern side of the line still survives and is maintained as a private house.

== Stationmasters ==
- A. Werrett 1876 - 1878
- S. Marshall 1878 - 1882
- R. Cotterill 1882 - 1888
- H. Gabb 1888 - 1903
- William Brown from 1903 (formerly station master at Ribblehead)
- E.C. Sones until 1914
- William Henry Clement 1914 - 1933 (also station master at Culgaith)

Preceding station	Historical railways	Following station
Long Marton	Midland Railway; Settle-Carlisle Railway	Culgaith
