= 1995 Ais Gill rail accident =

Rail accident in the United Kingdom

Coordinates: 54.38125°N 2.34666°W

Ais Gill rail accident (1995)

Details
- Date: 31 January 1995; 18:55
- Location: Aisgill, Cumbria
- Country: England
- Line: Settle-Carlisle Line
- Cause: Line obstructed by landslide

Statistics
- Trains: 2
- Crew: 2
- Deaths: 1
- Injured: 30+

The 1995 Ais Gill rail accident occurred near Aisgill, Cumbria, UK, at about 18:55 on 31 January 1995, when a class 156 Super-Sprinter was derailed by a landslide on the Settle-Carlisle Railway line, and was subsequently run into by a similar train travelling in the opposite direction. The guard of the first train was fatally injured in the collision.

== Events ==
=== Days before the collision ===
Weather leading into the last week of January 1995 was snow and frost, with the weather on the week of the accident consisting of snowfall, a brief thaw, and a snowstorm that turned into a rainstorm. In the 24 hours before the derailment, 2.5 inches (64 mm) of rain fell in the area. The excessive rainfall, on top of snow on the ground, increased landslide risk and rendered the Stainforth Tunnel impassable late on 31 January, closing the line from Ribblehead to Settle.

=== Prior to collision ===
Earlier on the day of the accident, a railway worker conducted an inspection of the line in the area, but observed no abnormal conditions at the area where the landslide would happen. The area also had no known prior landslides.

A Class 156 Super-Sprinter formed the 1626 Carlisle to Leeds via Settle service (headcode 2H88). It could only proceed as far as Ribblehead railway station, about 12 miles north of Settle, as the lines from Ribblehead to Settle were blocked by flooding, so it had to return to Carlisle. The driver changed cabs as the train was now heading northbound instead of southbound, and proceeded back over the Ribblehead Viaduct, and on to Aisgill Summit, the highest point on the line at 1,169 feet (356 m) above sea level. It was dark and raining heavily.

=== Landslide and collision ===
The train hit a landslide at Ash Bank, at 261 miles, 31 chains and 1.75 miles (2.82 km) north of Ais Gill Summit. The train was traveling at 60 miles per hour (97 km/h) and did not observe the landslide before the crash, and did not attempt to stop as a result. The first carriage derailed across both tracks, and the cabin lights turned off. The injured driver managed to radio Crewe control room. The conductor escorted passengers into the rear carriage, which was across the northbound track. He then returned to see the driver who was still in the cab. Either the conductor or the driver turned off the white headlamps and turned on the red taillamps to warn oncoming trains of the obstruction. The driver had no recollection of either placing the radio call on the National Network Radio with the emergency button or changing the head/tail lamps. The other person who could have done this, the guard, was killed in the second collision a few minutes later.

No precautions required by the Railtrack Rule Book - walking 1.25 miles (2.01 km), placing three detonators, and displaying a red handlamp - were taken by the guard to protect the train.

=== Second collision ===
Meanwhile, another Super-Sprinter train forming the 1745 Carlisle to Leeds service (headcode 2H92) had set off from Kirkby Stephen railway station around 5 miles (8.0 km) to the north. About 0.25 miles (0.40 km) before the derailed train, the driver saw its red lights and made an emergency brake application, but there was no chance of stopping before impacting the derailment. At 18:55, the southbound train struck the derailed northbound train at about 35 miles per hour (56 km/h). The guard's exact position at the time of the collision is not known, but it is generally accepted that he was in the front carriage, near the gangway connection between the two carriages and a door that had been opened post collision. After the collision, a passenger climbed down from the train and discovered the guard seriously injured, lying against a train wheel outside the train.

=== Aftermath ===
After colliding with the northbound train, the guard of the second train attempted to contact the signaller using the emergency button on the rear cab's NRN radio, but was unsuccessful. He then placed calls using the NRN's telephone functionality making contact with the signaller at Settle Junction signalbox, before checking the location of his train and reporting that in a second call. The signalman at Settle Junction signal box was informed of the accident by the conductor of the 2H92 service and the emergency services were then alerted.

The location was extremely difficult for emergency services to reach, and a rescue train was sent from Carlisle that arrived at 21:45, departed at 22:30 with the passengers and staff that needed evacuating.

The collision killed the conductor of the first train, and 30 people on the trains suffered some kind of injury. 26 people were treated at hospital in Carlisle, with 5 serious injuries.

A memorial to the guard, Stuart Wilson, was erected in Leeds City Station.

== Inquiry ==
Driver: Blea Moor to Carlisle, derailed blocking both roads. Can you stop the job between Kirkby Stephen and Blea Moor.
Control: We'll arrange all that, driver. Over and Out.

— Radio conversation between Driver and Crew Control, Hidden Dangers - Railway Safety in the Era of Privatisation (1999)

The official inquiry concluded that the conductor of 2H88 failed in his paramount duty to protect his train in the event of an incident by laying down detonators and displaying a red flag one mile from the obstruction. The time between the initial derailment and the subsequent collision was about six or seven minutes, which would have allowed a much greater warning time to be given to the second train and might have prevented the collision, or at least reduced its impact.

The inquiry noted a transcript of the call made from the driver of the train that hit the landslide. In his communications with the control centre at Crewe, the call ended with a control saying "we will take care of all of that, driver." This may have given the false impression that the southbound service that hit the first stricken service, would be warned appropriately and so the guard set about tending to the needs of his passengers. The chairman of the inquiry, Mr E N Clarke, said that protecting the train should have been the priority of the guard.

Further recommendations were made concerning the inadequate communications between Railtrack control rooms and inefficient use of the National Radio Network. A "group call" to all trains in the vicinity of the incident could have been made by the control room, and might have alerted the second train to the obstruction in time to prevent the collision.

== Similar 1999 incident ==
On 15 January 1999, a similar incident occurred around 10 miles (16 km) from the site of the 1995 accident, at Crosby Garrett Tunnel, north of Kirkby Stephen. A landslide caused a Carlisle-bound Class 156 Sprinter to derail. The driver of the train promptly departed after the derailment, to protect the train with detonators.

He had made it only 300 yards (270 m) when he heard an approaching train and managed to place a single detonator, and waved a red signal lamp. The driver of the approaching train, a loaded 32 wagon coal train, led by a Class 60 managed to nearly stop, colliding with the derailed Super-Sprinter at just under 3 miles per hour (4.8 km/h). There were no fatalities, and injuries were not serious.
