= Dent Head Viaduct =

Railway viaduct in Cumbria, England

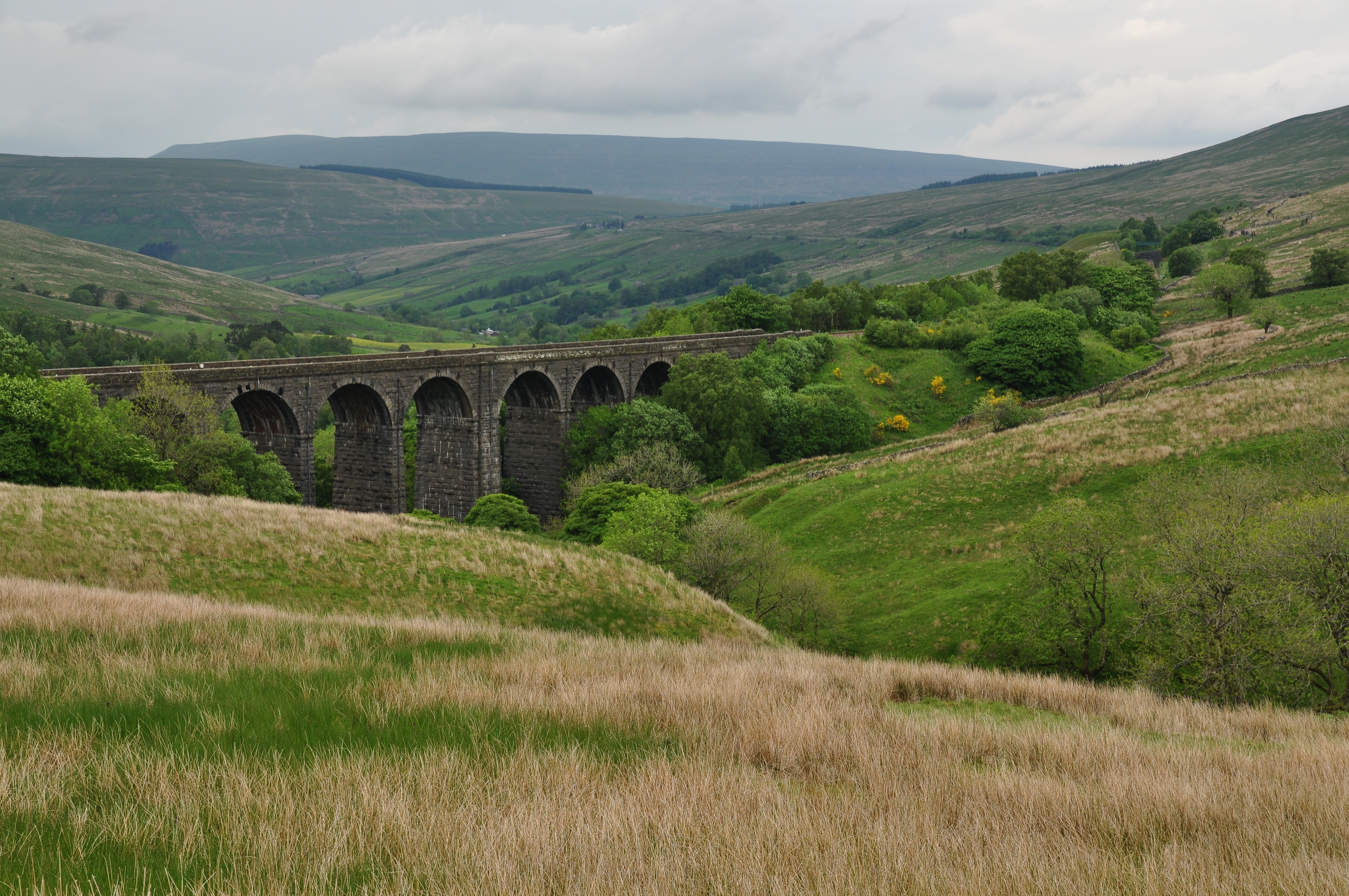
- Dent Head Viaduct; the line can be seen wending around Woldfell
- Coordinates: 54.254°N 2.342°W
- OS grid reference: SD777844
- Carries: Settle–Carlisle line
- Crosses: Fell End Gill
- Locale: Dentdale, Cumbria, England
- Named for: The head of Dentdale
- Owner: Network Rail

Characteristics
- Total length: 596 feet (182 m)
- Height: 100 feet (30 m)
- No. of spans: 10

Rail characteristics
- No. of tracks: 2
- Track gauge: 4 ft 8 1/2 in (1,435 mm) standard gauge

History
- Construction start: 1869
- Construction end: 1875
- Opened: 2 August 1875

Location
- Interactive map of Dent Head Viaduct

Dent Head Viaduct is a railway viaduct on the Settle–Carlisle line in Dentdale, Cumbria, England. It is the second major viaduct on the line northwards after Ribblehead Viaduct, and is just north of Blea Moor Tunnel at milepost 251, and to the south of Arten Gill Viaduct. Construction of the viaduct began in 1869, and it was completed in 1875, extra time being needed due to periods of heavy rainfall. The line bows slightly to the east in order to follow the contours of Woldfell, which it navigates on the western side. The viaduct was grade II Listed in 1999. Dent Head Viaduct is 17 miles (27 km) north of Settle Junction, and 57 miles (92 km) south of Carlisle railway station.

== History ==
The viaduct is 596 feet (182 m) long, 100 feet (30 m) high, and consists of ten arches which are each 45 feet (14 m) across. The parapets of the viaduct are measured at 1,150 feet (350 m) above sea level. The spans are grouped into two sets of five, separated by a larger pier in the middle. The viaduct is constructed from a local limestone known as Blue Limestone, which was quarried from Short Gill (quite near the viaduct itself) from the beds of Simonstone limestone, and another quarry almost underneath the viaduct. The chief engineer on the project was John Crossley, while the resident engineer for the viaduct itself was J Underwood, who worked as part of Contract No. 1 (Settle Junction to Dent Head). Immediately north of Dent Head Viaduct, was Contract No. 2, which ran to Kirkby Stephen. A signalbox used to be situated at the very northern end of the viaduct. One was thought to have been installed in 1877, however it is known that one was put up in 1898, which remained in use until April 1965.

Akin to the weather problems at Dandry Mire, the construction of the viaduct was hampered by the constant rain and snow. In 1872, it was recorded that 92 inches of rain fell at Dent Head, instead of the average 68 inches. This destabilised the workings and also prevented safe working days to far fewer than on other areas of the contract to build the line. The viaduct was constructed between 1869 and 1875, and bows slightly eastwards, but follows a north/south axis. The line follows this curvature so as to avoid Woldfell, and in doing so, climbs slightly after the viaduct towards Arten Gill Viaduct. It is thought that a tramway was built to transport bricks from the brickworks site at Ribblehead (Batty Moss), to the viaduct construction site at Dent Head. Whilst trains may have traversed the viaduct before its official opening, the first train run along the entire length of the line (a goods train) ran on 2 August 1875. The initial plans for the railway included a station at Dent Head, which would not have been convenient for any local population.

During the 1980s closure proposal for most of the Settle–Carlisle Line, the decaying and unsafe nature of the various viaducts was given as a reason for the proposed closure. Whilst the focus of these claims was focussed on Ribblehead Viaduct, Dent Head was also included, and as such, as part of the rebuttal, it was inspected by an independent civil engineer who deemed the viaduct to be structurally sound. However, as it, and many other viaducts on the line, were not listed structures, upon closure, they would not have to be maintained by British Rail. The viaduct was finally grade II listed in 1999, and is also listed with Historic England as a Scheduled Ancient Monument.

The viaduct is located at milepost 251; 251 miles (404 km) north of St Pancras railway station (the old Midland Railway route) through Cudworth and Keighley, though the route through Cudworth closed in 1980s. In terms of the railway line itself, the viaduct is 17 miles (27 km) north of Settle Junction, and 57 miles (92 km) south of Carlisle railway station.

== Derailment ==
On 14 July 1998, a Transrail freight train carrying imported Colombian coal, that was travelling between Hunterston and Drax Power Station, derailed with some of the coal wagons coming to rest at the northern end of the viaduct. Coal was spilled into the beck beneath the viaduct. The accident prompted calls for the renewal of the Settle–Carlisle Line, which was increasingly being used by heavy freight trains.

== See also ==
- Infrastructure of the Settle–Carlisle line
- Listed buildings in Dent, Cumbria
