= Hawes Junction engine shed =

Former railway depot in England

- Interactive map of Hawes Junction engine shed

Location
- Location: Garsdale, Cumbria, England
- Coordinates: 54.3194°N 2.3298°W
- OS grid: SD786916

Characteristics
- Type: Locomotive
- Roads: 1
- Routes served: Wensleydale line

History
- Opened: 1879
- Closed: 1939
- Original: MR
- Pre-grouping: NER
- Post-grouping: LNER

Hawes Junction engine shed was a small locomotive depot situated to the south of Hawes Junction railway station, (later Garsdale (Note: The station opened as Hawes Junction in 1876, and was renamed to Hawes Junction and Garsdale in 1900. It was renamed again to Garsdale in 1932. The NER always referred to the shed as "Hawes Junction".)) in what is now Cumbria, (Note: The modern day location: until 1974, the site was in the West Riding of Yorkshire.) England, between 1879 and 1939. The depot was built by the Midland Railway (MR), but was used between 1881 and 1939 by the North Eastern Railway (NER) and then the London and North Eastern Railway (LNER), providing locomotives for the Wensleydale line.

== History ==
The initial proposals for an engine shed detailed accommodation and servicing for 24 locomotives to provide banking assistance to other trains on the gradients of the Settle–Carlisle line. This was later curtailed to half that requirement on account of the high costs involved. Later assessments on the requirements detailed that the company had overspent, and needed to introduce economies. The Settle and Carlisle line opened in 1876, and the Hawes Branch opened in 1878, but the shed did not open until 1879. By the time of its opening, the original plan had been amended further so that Hawes junction had "..a small engine shed (designed for stabling a single locomotive)." The Midland Railway had an intention that Hawes Junction would become a swapping point for locomotives, and as such, it was authorised that twenty houses would be built at Hawes Junction to accommodate drivers and their families. The depot was situated to the south of the station and was only accessible from the north; locomotives approaching from the south would need to reverse in. Mapping showing the extant shed, details a single-road facility spanning a stream coming off the nearby hillside which feeds into the River Clough. The shed had two additional sidings on either side, which stopped short of the shed area.

In 1881, the Midland Railway offered to lease the shed to the NER at a rate of £2 per engine, per month, to which the NER agreed and it came into force in June 1881. The NER also paid nine shillings per week to the Midland Railway for the use of three railway cottages to house the locomotive and depot staff. The depot housed the locomotive from the last working of the day on the Wensleydale Line. The locomotive was shedded overnight, and then worked the first service down the valley (eastwards) in the morning. The solitary engine based at Hawes Junction worked two services along the line during the day, with a similar operation starting from Northallerton engine shed in the morning, and also taking two trips down the branch.

In October 1917, a spark from a passing goods train set the engine shed on fire, and it burnt down, but it was rebuilt in 1918. It is unknown if the NER or the MR paid for the shed to be rebuilt, but the locomotive inside the shed on the night of fire suffered some cosmetic damage (the paint coming off and the wooden buffer-beams were burnt). In February 1939, the LNER revised their working timetable for the Wensleydale line, and the last and first trains of the day terminated and started at Leyburn railway station, so the locomotive was stabled overnight at the shed in Leyburn which was re-opened, having been closed in 1915. The 1918 engine shed was demolished sometime between 1939 and 1955, though a dead-end siding ran to the buffer-stops of the old engine shed site.

== Locomotives ==
The shed had no allocations, merely being a stabling point overnight for locomotives being used on the Wensleydale Line. North Eastern Railway and London & North Eastern Railway engines used the shed, even though it was a Midland Railway facility, and these included the classes 398, A and G5.
