= Long Marton railway station =

Former railway station in Cumbria, England

Coordinates: 54.6172°N 2.5187°W

Long Marton
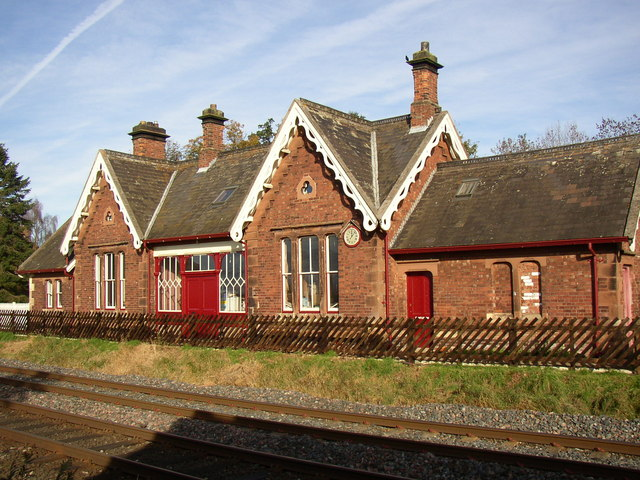
- Long Marton railway station main building in 2006

General information
- Location: Long Marton, Westmorland and Furness; England
- Platforms: 2

Other information
- Status: Disused

History
- Original company: Midland Railway
- Pre-grouping: Midland Railway
- Post-grouping: London, Midland and Scottish Railway

Key dates
- 1 May 1876: Station opens
- 4 May 1970: Station closes
Location

Long Marton railway station was a railway station which served the village of Long Marton in Cumbria, England. Situated on the Settle-Carlisle Line, it was located 27 3/4 miles (44.7 km) south of Carlisle.

== History ==
The station was designed by the Midland Railway company architect John Holloway Sanders and was opened along with the line in 1876 and closed on 4 May 1970, when the local passenger service over the line was withdrawn.

The main station buildings were located on the eastern, southbound, platform and were sold and converted into a private residence after closure. They currently remain in use as holiday accommodation. Both platforms have been demolished and removed.

== Stationmasters ==
- J. Moorcroft 1876 - 1900
- William Hinman 1900 - ca. 1914
- T. Proctor from 1920 - ????
- Richard W. Powell 1931 - 1936 (formerly station master at Lazonby, also station master at Ormside and Appleby)
- George Graham Hodgson 1936 - 1953
- Mr. Harper ca. 1958

== Notes ==
Preceding station	Historical railways	Following station
Appleby	Midland Railway; Settle-Carlisle Railway	New Biggin
