= Ribblehead Viaduct =

Railway viaduct in North Yorkshire, England

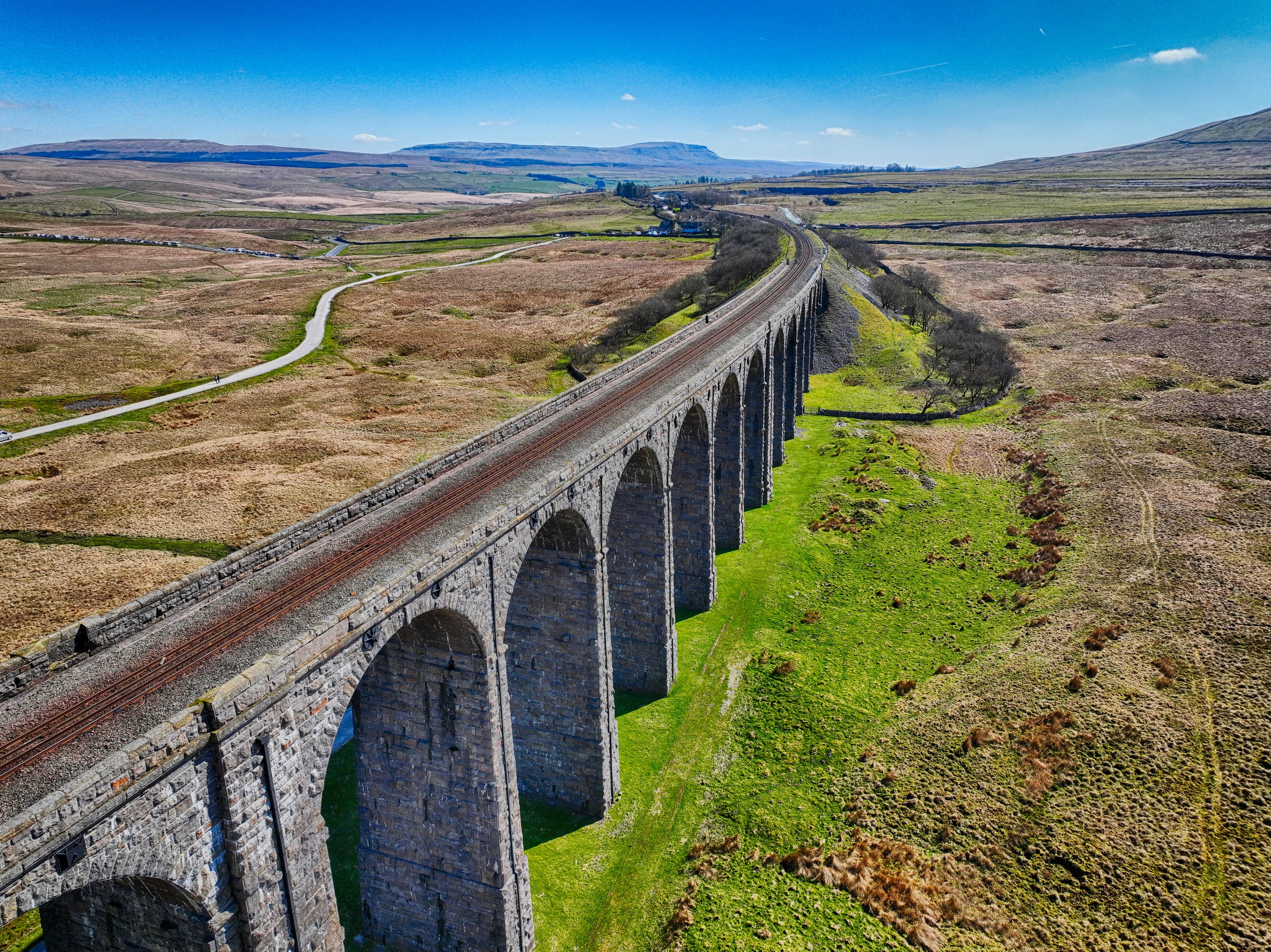
- Ribblehead Viaduct
- Coordinates: 54.2104°N 2.3702°W
- Crosses: Batty Moss
- Owner: Network Rail
- Maintained by: Network Rail

Characteristics
- Total length: 440 yards (400 m)
- Height: 104 feet (32 m)
- No. of spans: 24

History
- Designer: John Sydney Crossley
- Construction start: 12 October 1870
- Opened: 3 August 1875

Location
- Interactive map of Ribblehead Viaduct

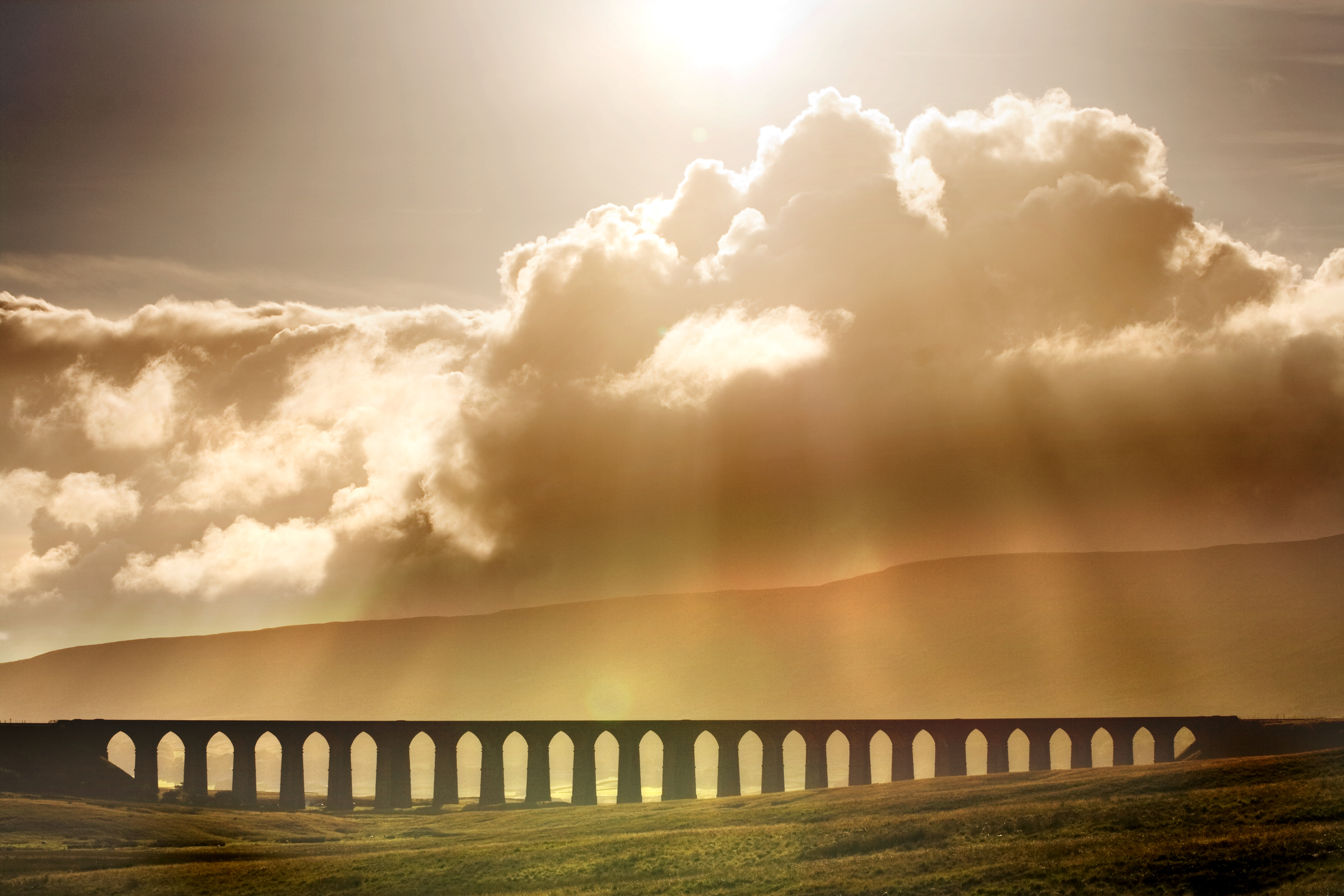
Sunrise over the viaduct

The Ribblehead Viaduct or Batty Moss Viaduct carries the Settle–Carlisle railway across Batty Moss in the Ribble Valley at Ribblehead, in North Yorkshire, England. The viaduct, built by the Midland Railway, is 28 miles (45 km) north-west of Skipton and 26 miles (42 km) south-east of Kendal. It is a Grade II* listed structure. Ribblehead Viaduct is the longest and the third tallest structure on the Settle–Carlisle line.

The viaduct was designed by John Sydney Crossley, chief engineer of the Midland Railway, who was responsible for the design and construction of all major structures along the line. The viaduct was necessitated by the challenging terrain of the route. Construction began in late 1869. It necessitated a large workforce, up to 2,300 men, most of whom lived in shanty towns set up near its base. Over 100 men lost their lives during its construction. The Settle to Carlisle line was the last main railway in Britain to be constructed primarily with manual labour.

By the end of 1874, the last stone of the structure had been laid; on 1 May 1876, the Settle–Carlisle line was opened for passenger services. During the 1980s, British Rail proposed closing the line. In 1989, after lobbying by the public against closure, it was announced that the line would be retained. Since the 1980s, the viaduct has had multiple repairs and restorations and the lines relaid as a single track. The land underneath and around the viaduct is a scheduled monument; the remains of the construction camp and navvy settlements (Batty Wife Hole, Sebastopol, and Belgravia) are located there.

== History ==
=== Background ===
In the 1860s, the Midland Railway, keen to capitalise on the growth in rail traffic between England and Scotland, proposed building a line between Settle and Carlisle. The line was intended to join the Midland line between Skipton and Carnforth to the city of Carlisle. On 16 July 1866, the Midland Railway (Settle to Carlisle) Act was passed by Parliament, authorising the company "to construct Railways from Settle to Hawes, Appleby, and Carlisle; and for other Purposes".

After the Act passed, the Midland Railway came to an agreement with the London & North Western Railway, to run services on the LNWR line via Shap. The company applied for a bill of abandonment for its original plan but Parliament rejected the bill on 16 April 1869 and the Midland Railway was compelled to build the Settle to Carlisle line.

The line passed through difficult terrain that necessitated building several substantial structures. The company's chief engineer, John Sydney Crossley and its general manager, James Joseph Allport, surveyed the line. Crossley was responsible for the design and construction of the major works, including Ribblehead Viaduct.

On 6 November 1869, a contract to construct the Settle Junction (SD813606) to Dent Head Viaduct section including Ribblehead Viaduct was awarded to contractor John Ashwell. The estimated cost was £343,318 and completion was expected by May 1873. Work commenced at the southern end of the 72-mile (116 km) line.

=== Construction ===
By July 1870, work had started on the foundations for Ribblehead Viaduct. On 12 October 1870, contractor's agent William Henry Ashwell laid the first stone. Financial difficulties came to greatly trouble John Ashwell; on 26 October 1871, his contract was cancelled by mutual agreement. From this date, the viaduct was constructed by the Midland Railway who worked on a semi-contractual basis overseen by William Ashwell.

The viaduct was built by a workforce of up to 2,300 men. They lived, often with their families, in temporary camps, named Batty Wife Hole, Sebastopol, and Belgravia on adjacent land. More than a hundred workers lost their lives in construction-related accidents, fighting, or from outbreaks of smallpox. According to Church of England records, there are around 200 burials of men, women, and children in the graveyard at Chapel-le-Dale and the church has a memorial to the railway workers.

In December 1872, the design for Ribblehead Viaduct was changed from 18 arches to 24, each spanning 45 feet (13.7 m). By August 1874, the arches had been keyed and the last stone was laid by the end of the year. A single track was laid over the viaduct and on 6 September 1874 the first train carrying passengers was hauled across by the locomotive Diamond. On 3 August 1875, the viaduct was opened for freight traffic and on 1 May 1876, the whole line opened for passenger services, following approval by Colonel F. H. Rich from the Board of Trade.

== Structure ==
Ribblehead Viaduct is 440 yards (400 m) long, and 104 feet (32 m) above the valley floor at its highest point, it was designed to carry a pair of tracks aligned over the sleeper walls. The viaduct has 24 arches of 45 feet (14 m) span, the foundations of which are 25 feet (7.6 m) deep. The piers are tapered, roughly 13 feet (4 m) across at the base and 5 feet 11 inches (1.8 m) thick near the arches and have loosely-packed rubble-filled cores. Every sixth pier is 50 per cent thicker, a mitigating measure against collapse should any of the piers fail. The north end is 13 feet (4 m) higher in elevation than the south, a gradient of 1:100.

The viaduct is faced with limestone masonry set in hydraulic lime mortar and the near-semicircular arches are red brick, constructed in five separate rings, with stone voussoirs. Sleeper walls rise from the arches to support the stone slabs of the viaduct's deck and hollow spandrels support plain solid parapet walls. In total, 1.5 million bricks were used; some of the limestone blocks weigh eight tons.

Ribblehead Viaduct is 980 feet (300 m) above sea level on moorland exposed to the prevailing westerly wind. Its height, from foundation to rails is 55 yards (50.3 m). It is 442.7 yards (404.8 m) long on a lateral curve with a radius of 0.85 miles (1.37 km).

The viaduct is the longest structure on the Settle–Carlisle Railway which has two taller viaducts, Smardale Viaduct at 131 feet (40 m) near Crosby Garrett, and Arten Gill at 117 feet (36 m). Ribblehead railway station is less than half a mile to the south and to the north is Blea Moor Tunnel, the longest on the line, near the foot of Whernside.

== Operations ==
During 1964, several Humber cars were blown off their wagons while being carried over the viaduct on a freight train.

By 1980, the viaduct was in disrepair and many of its piers had been weakened by water ingress. Between 1981 and 1984, repairs were undertaken as a cost of roughly £100,000. Repairs included strengthening the piers by the addition of steel rails and concrete cladding. For safety reasons, the line was reduced to single track across the viaduct to avoid the simultaneous loading from two trains crossing, and a 20-mile-per-hour (32 km/h) speed limit was imposed. During 1988, minor repairs were carried out and trial bores were made into several piers. In 1989, a waterproof membrane was installed.

In the 1980s, British Rail proposed closing the line, citing the high cost of repairs to its major structures. Vigorous campaigning by the Friends of the Settle-Carlisle Line, formed during 1981, garnered and mobilised public support against the plan. In 1989, the line was saved from closure. According to Michael Portillo, who took the decision in his capacity as Minister of State for Transport, the economic arguments for closing it had been weakened by a spike in passenger numbers, and further studies by engineers had determined that restoration work would not be nearly as costly as estimated.

In November 1988, Ribblehead Viaduct was Grade II* listed. The surrounding land where the remains of its construction camps are located has been recognised as a scheduled monument.

Between 1990 and 1992, Ribblehead Viaduct underwent major restoration. Between September 1999 and March 2001, a programme of improvements was implemented involving renewal of track, replacement of ballast and the installation of new drainage. Restoration has allowed for increased levels of freight traffic assuring the line's viability.

The Settle–Carlisle Line is one of three north–south main lines, along with the West Coast Main Line through Penrith and the East Coast Main Line via Newcastle. During 2016, the line carried seven passenger trains from Leeds to Carlisle per day in each direction, and long-distance excursions, many hauled by preserved steam locomotives.

Regular heavy freight trains use the route avoiding congestion on the West Coast Main Line. Timber trains, and stone from Ingleton quarry, pass over the viaduct when they depart from the yard opposite Ribblehead railway station. The stone from Ingleton is ferried to the terminal at Ribblehead by road. Limestone aggregate trains from Arcow quarry sidings (near Horton-in-Ribblesdale) run to various stone terminals in the Leeds and Manchester areas on different days – these trains reverse in the goods loop at Blea Moor signal box because the connection from the quarry sidings faces north. Sidings at Horton quarry, also facing north, opened in May 2025.

Major restoration work started in November 2020 as a £2.1 million project to re-point mortar joints and replace broken stones got underway. Network Rail released a timelapse video of the works in June 2021.

== In popular culture ==
Building the viaduct was the inspiration behind the ITV period drama series Jericho. The viaduct appears in the 1970 film No Blade of Grass and also in the 2012 film Sightseers. A number of other films and television programmes have also included the viaduct.

== See also ==
- Grade II* listed buildings in North Yorkshire (district)
- Infrastructure of the Settle–Carlisle line
- Listed buildings in Ingleton, North Yorkshire
- Glenfinnan Viaduct
