= Dandry Mire Viaduct =

Railway viaduct in Cumbria, England

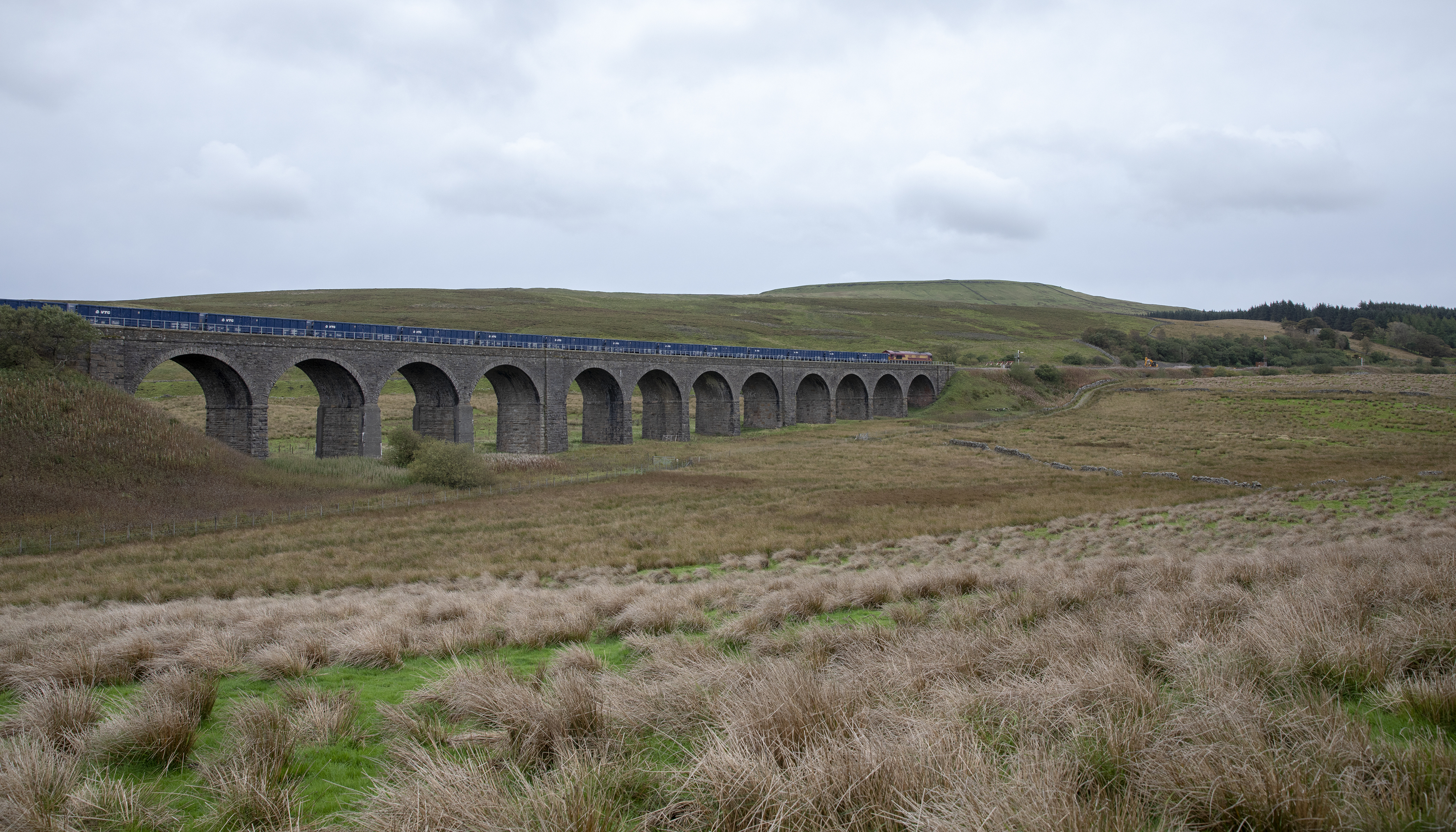
- Dandry Mire Viaduct
- Coordinates: 54.325°N 2.319°W
- OS grid reference: SD723923
- Carries: Settle & Carlisle line
- Crosses: Dandry Mire
- Locale: Garsdale, Cumbria, England
- Other name(s): Moorcock Viaduct; Garsdale Viaduct
- Owner: Network Rail

Characteristics
- Material: Sandstone
- Total length: 11 chains (730 ft; 220 m) (Note: Chains is the measurement used by the railway engineers in the 19th century, and still in use today on Network Rail.)
- Height: 50 feet (15 m)
- No. of spans: 12

Rail characteristics
- No. of tracks: 2
- Track gauge: 4 ft 8 1/2 in (1,435 mm) standard gauge

History
- Architect: John Holloway Sanders
- Construction start: 1873
- Construction end: 1875

Statistics

Listed Building – Grade II
- Designated: 14 June 1984
- Reference no.: 1384058

Location
- Interactive map of Dandry Mire Viaduct

Dandry Mire Viaduct, (or Dandrymire Viaduct), is a railway viaduct on the Settle & Carlisle line in Cumbria, (Note: The viaduct was originally in the West Riding of Yorkshire until the county boundary changes of 1974, which placed it in Cumbria.) England. It is just north of Garsdale station, 21 miles (34 km) from Settle, and 51 miles (82 km) south of Carlisle. When the Settle & Carlisle line was being built, the traversing of Dandry Mire was to have been by use of an embankment, but the bog swallowed all of the material poured into it, so a trench was dug instead, and a viaduct constructed. The viaduct, which is 227 yards (208 m) long and 50 feet (15 m) high, is still open to traffic on the railway, and is a prominent landmark at the head of Garsdale.

== History ==
Work started on this part of the line in 1871 as part of the second contract let, with the original intent of crossing Dandry Mire Moss on an embankment rather than a viaduct. In 1873, it was reported that over 250,000 cubic yards (190,000 m^{3}) of material had been poured into the bog, which had just swallowed it all up, displacing the peat, so much so, that it formed ridges either side of the proposed embankment to a height of nearly 15 feet (4.6 m). The continual wet weather combined with the boggy nature of Dandry Mire, combined to prompt the builders to try a different approach.

John Sanders, the main architect for the structures on the line, designed a viaduct, and J S Crossley was the chief engineer during the build period. Conversion to a viaduct began in 1873, originally as an 8-arch viaduct, which later became a 12-arch structure, listed under the design plans as bridge 117. The arches, which are built from coursed sandstone, were complete by May 1875, with the approach embankments finished two months later. The parapet was completed in September of the same year.

Variations in the length of viaduct are given; mapping from Trackmaps lists it as being 11 chains (730 ft; 220 m), whereas some writers list it as being 227 yards (208 m), or 700 feet (210 m). The height is listed as 50 feet (15 m) above the bog, but the foundation of each span is dug down to a depth of 15 feet (4.6 m). The viaduct has twelve-spans, with each span being between 44 feet 3 inches (13.49 m) and 45 feet (14 m) in length, grouped in three lots of four with a thicker pier dividing each group.

The structure is often called Dandry Mire, but it has been known as Moorcock Viaduct, and occasionally as Garsdale Viaduct, though Dandry Mire is more common than the other two. Some sources list the spelling as one word (Dandrymire), such as Ordnance Survey mapping, and typos are quite common (Dandy Mire). The name Dandry Mire, is first recorded in 1771.

During the Second World War, a Luftwaffe bomber dropped bombs near the viaduct; it missed the viaduct by several hundred yards, although it was apparently aiming for Newcastle, some 70 miles (110 km) away.

The viaduct is 21 miles (34 km) north of Settle railway station, and 51 miles (82 km) south of Carlisle railway station, with it being measured as 257 miles (414 km) north of London St Pancras. Besides spanning Dandry Mire Moss, the viaduct also now spans the Pennine Bridleway between Garsdale railway station, and Moorcock Inn. The south side of the A684 road by Moorcock Inn is the site of the Dandry Mire camp, where stone-masons and navvies associated with constructing the viaduct (and other structures on this stretch of line) were housed. The viaduct was grade II listed in June 1984, and is recognised as being a prominent landmark at the head of Garsdale, where the watershed divides between the Rivers Clough, Eden and Ure.

== See also ==
- Infrastructure of the Settle–Carlisle line
