= Settle Junction railway station =

Former railway station in North Yorkshire, England

Settle Junction
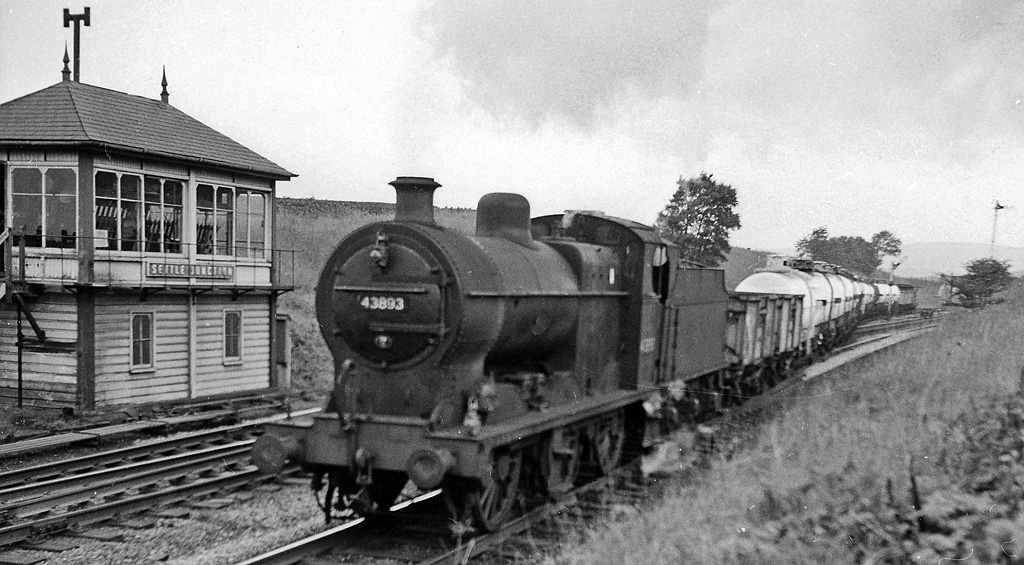
- Up ammonia tank empties in 1962

General information
- Location: Settle, North Yorkshire; England
- Coordinates: 54.0404°N 2.2818°W
- Grid reference: SD815605
- Elevation: 425 feet (130 m)
- Platforms: 2

Other information
- Status: Disused

History
- Pre-grouping: Midland Railway

Key dates
- October 1876: Opened
- 1 November 1877: Closed to passengers
Location

Settle Junction railway station was located near the town of Settle, North Yorkshire, England, immediately to south of the junction between the Midland Railway's North Western and Settle-Carlisle branches, 39 3/4 miles (64 km) northwest of Leeds.

== History ==
It was opened five months after the main line to Carlisle to serve as an "exchange station" with the older route to Morecambe (as stated in an 1872 report submitted to the Settle and Carlisle Construction Committee of the MR by General Manager James Allport and Chief Engineer John Crossley). However, the expected traffic failed to materialise and after just one year of operation, it was closed on 1 November 1877.

Its remote location (1 3/4 miles (2.8 km) south of Settle and 2 miles (3.2 km) north of Long Preston) undoubtedly contributed to its early demise, as potential travellers had the choice of three alternative stations (Settle, Giggleswick or Long Preston) that were all more conveniently sited for their respective communities.

== Stationmaster ==
W. Jenkins was installed as the first station master in 1876 but only served one year until 2 November 1877, when the station management was placed under the direct supervision of Long Preston.

== The site today ==
Little trace of the station remains today, although the station house survived in private ownership until well after nationalisation of the railways in 1948, finally succumbing to demolition in the late 1960s. Settle Junction signal box (a Midland Railway timber structure dating from 1913) is still operational and can easily be seen from the adjacent A65, which runs alongside the railway at this point. The box houses a London Midland Region standard frame of 31 levers and controls the busy double junction (which was rebuilt following a derailment in 1979) between the two lines, as well as the block sections toward Hellifield to the south, Blea Moor Sidings to the north and Carnforth Station Junction to the north west.

The latter is the longest block section on the UK rail network at just over 24 miles (39 km) in length and severely restricts the capacity of the Carnforth line (a typical passenger train is timetabled to take 40 minutes to travel from one end of the section to the other, including station stops). Network Rail has acknowledged the performance issues this can cause in its 2008 Lancashire and Cumbria Route Utilisation Strategy and hopes to install additional signalling along the route at some point in the future to address the problem. The same strategy has recently been adopted to solve similar headway issues on the 15 miles (24 km) section to Blea Moor (additional signals having been commissioned at Horton-in-Ribblesdale to allow a second train to proceed as far as Horton once the preceding train has passed there).

== Bibliography ==
- Flinders, T.G. (1981), On The Settle-Carlisle Route, Ian Allan Ltd, Shepperton, Surrey. ISBN 0-7110-1080-3

Preceding station	Historical railways	Following station
Long Preston	Midland Railway "Little" North Western Railway	Giggleswick
Long Preston	Midland Railway; Settle-Carlisle Railway	Settle
