= Settle–Carlisle line =

Railway line in northern England

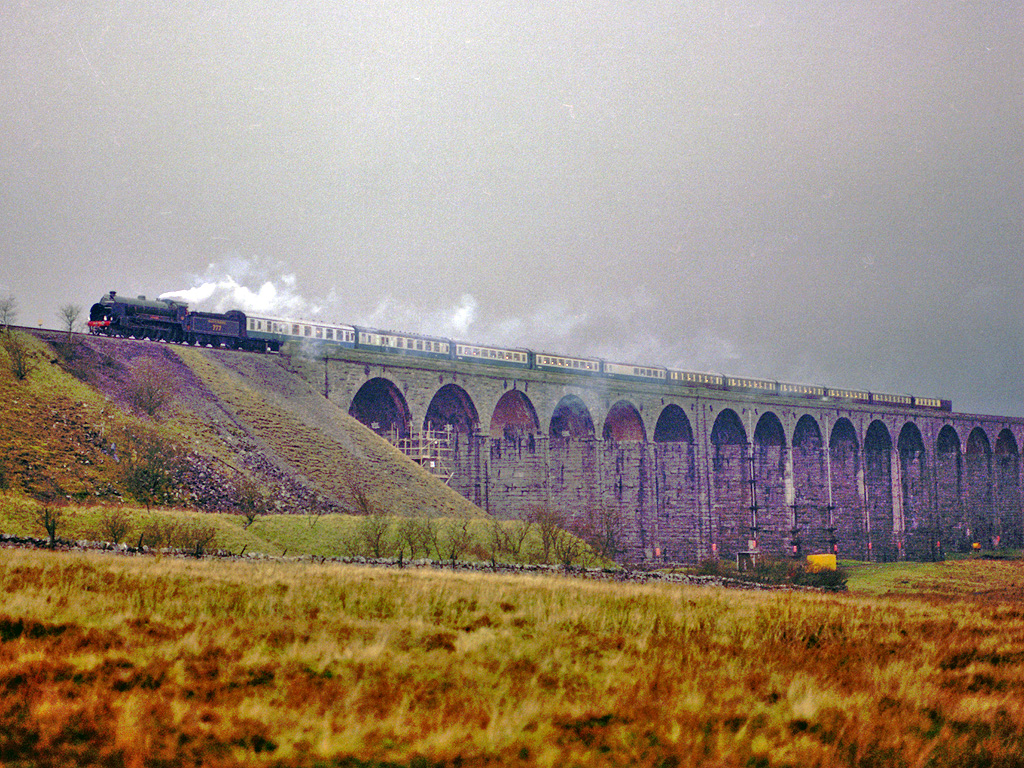
- Steam locomotive Sir Lamiel on the Ribblehead Viaduct in 1982

Overview
- Status: Operational
- Owner: Network Rail
- Locale: North West England; Yorkshire and the Humber
- Termini: Settle 54.0669°N 2.2807°W; Carlisle 54.8911°N 2.9335°W
- Stations: 19

Service
- Type: Main line
- System: National Rail
- Operator: Northern Trains
- Depot(s): Neville Hill, Leeds
- Rolling stock: Primarily Class 158

History
- Opened: 1875 (goods) and 1876 (passengers)

Technical
- Line length: 71.75 mi (115.47 km)
- Number of tracks: Double (except Ribblehead Viaduct)
- Track gauge: Standard gauge 4 ft 8 1/2 in (1,435 mm)
- Electrification: No
- Operating speed: 60 mph (97 km/h)
- Highest elevation: Ais Gill Summit (1,169 feet (356 m))
Route map
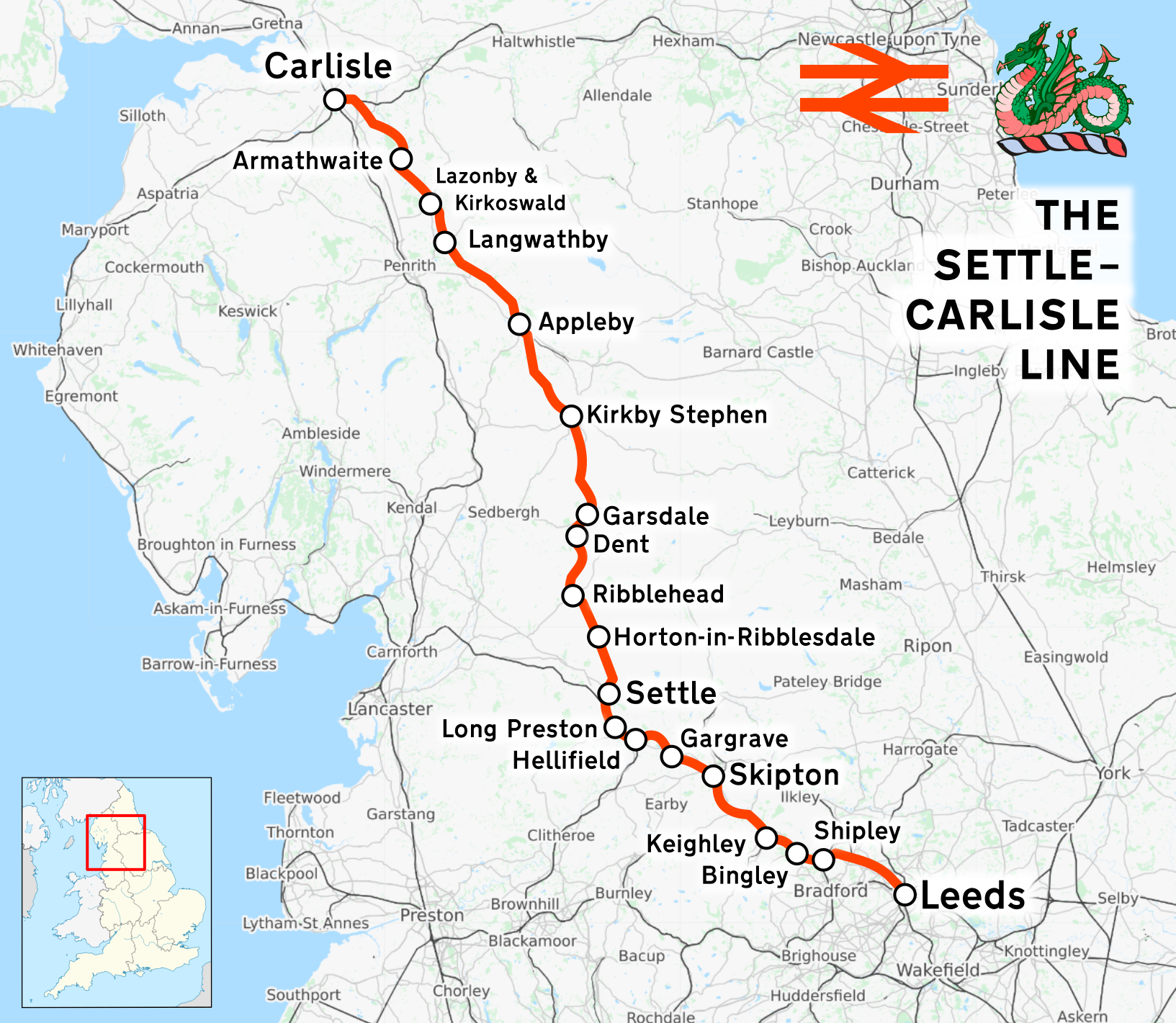
(Click to expand)

The Settle–Carlisle line (also known as the Settle and Carlisle (S&C)) is a 73-mile-long (117 km) main railway line in northern England. The route, which crosses the remote, scenic regions of the Yorkshire Dales and the North Pennines, runs between Settle Junction, on the Leeds–Morecambe line, and Carlisle. The historic line was constructed in the 1870s and has several notable tunnels and viaducts such as the imposing Ribblehead.

The line is managed by Network Rail. All passenger services are operated by Northern apart from temporary diverted services (due to closures of the West Coast Main Line) and are part of the National Rail network. Stations serve towns such as Settle in North Yorkshire, Appleby-in-Westmorland in Cumbria and small rural communities along its route.

In the 1980s, British Rail planned to close the Settle–Carlisle line. This prompted a campaign to save the line by rail groups, enthusiasts, local authorities and residents along the route. In 1989, the UK government announced the line would be saved from closure. Since then, passenger numbers have grown steadily to 1.2 million in 2012. Eight formerly closed stations have been reopened and several quarries have been reconnected to the line. It remains one of the most popular railway routes in the UK for charter trains. After damage by a landslip, part of the line was closed from February 2016 to March 2017. To celebrate the reopening, the first passenger train was operated with a steam locomotive, the first scheduled mainline steam service in England for nearly half a century.

== History ==
=== Background ===
The Settle–Carlisle line (S&C) had its origins in railway politics; the expansion-minded Midland Railway company was locked in dispute with the rival London and North Western Railway (LNWR) over access rights to the latter's tracks to Scotland.

The Midland's access to Scotland was via the "Little North Western" route to Ingleton. The Ingleton branch line from Ingleton to Low Gill, where it joined the Lancaster and Carlisle Railway, was under the control of the rival LNWR. Initially the routes, although physically connected at Ingleton, were not logically connected, as the LNWR and Midland could not agree on sharing the use of Ingleton station. Instead the LNWR terminated its trains at its own station at the end of Ingleton Viaduct, and Midland Railway passengers had to walk about a mile over steep gradients between the two stations in order to change into/from LNWR trains.

An agreement was reached over station access, enabling the Midland to attach through carriages to LNWR trains at Ingleton. Passengers could continue their journey north without leaving the train. The situation was not ideal, as the LNWR handled the through carriages of its rival with deliberate obstructiveness, for example attaching the coaches to slow goods trains instead of fast passenger workings.

The route through Ingleton is closed, but the major structures, Low Gill and Ingleton viaducts, remain. It was a well-engineered line suitable for express passenger running, but its potential was never realised due to the rivalry between the companies. The Midland board decided that the only solution was a separate route to Scotland. Surveying began in 1865, and in June 1866, approval was given to the Midland's bill, for which Samuel Carter was solicitor, and the Midland Railway (Settle to Carlisle) Act 1866 (29 & 30 Vict. c. ccxxiii) became law. Soon afterwards, the Overend-Gurney banking failure sparked a financial crisis in the UK. Interest rates rose sharply, several railways went bankrupt and the Midland's board, prompted by a shareholders' revolt, began to have second thoughts about a venture whose estimated cost was £2.3 million (equivalent to £240 million in 2025). As a result, in April 1869, with no work started, the company petitioned Parliament to abandon the scheme it had earlier fought for. However Parliament, under pressure from other railways which would benefit from the scheme that would cost them nothing, refused, and construction commenced in November that year.

=== Construction ===
The line was built by over 6,000 navvies, most of them Irish, who worked in remote locations, enduring harsh weather conditions. Large camps were established to house them, with many becoming complete townships with post offices and schools. They were named Inkerman, Sebastapol and Jericho. The remains of one camp – Batty Green – where over 2,000 navvies lived and worked, can be seen near Ribblehead. Scripture readers helped to counteract the effect of drunken violence in these isolated communities.

A plaque in St Leonard's Church, Chapel-le-Dale, records the workers who died, both from disease and from accidents, while building the railway. The death toll is unknown, but 80 people died at Batty Green alone in a smallpox epidemic.

A memorial stone was laid in 1997 in the churchyard of St Mary's Church, Mallerstang to commemorate the 25 railway builders and their families who died during the construction of this section of the line, and who were buried there in unmarked graves.

The engineer for the project was John Crossley from Leicestershire, a veteran of other Midland schemes. The terrain traversed is among the bleakest and wildest in England, and construction was halted for months at a time due to frozen ground, snowdrifts and flooding. One contractor had to give up as a result of underestimating the terrain and the weather – Dent Head has almost four times the rainfall of London. Another long-established partnership dissolved under the strain: that of William Eckersley and John Bayliss (1826–1900), Bayliss continued the project until its completion in 1877. They were contracted to construct the 23 mi (37 km) section from Kirkby Thore to Petteril Bridge in Carlisle.

The line was engineered to express standards throughout – local traffic was secondary, and many stations were miles from the villages they purported to serve. The railway's summit at 1,169 feet (356 m) is at Aisgill, north of Garsdale. To keep the gradients to less than 1 in 100 (1%), a requirement for fast running using steam traction, huge engineering works were required. Even so, the terrain imposed a 16-mile (26 km) climb from Settle to Blea Moor, almost all of it at 1 in 100, and known to enginemen as "the long drag".

The line required 14 tunnels and 22 viaducts; the most notable is the 24-arch Ribblehead Viaduct which is 104 ft (32 m) high and 440 yards (402 m) long. The swampy ground meant that the piers had to be sunk 25 ft (8 m) below the peat and set in concrete in order to provide a suitable foundation. Soon after crossing the viaduct, the line enters Blea Moor tunnel, 2,629 yd (2,404 m) long and 500 ft (152 m) below the moor, before emerging onto Dent Head Viaduct. The summit at Ais Gill is the highest point reached by main-line trains in England. The tunnel at Lazonby was constructed at the request of a local vicar as he did not want the railway to run past the vicarage.

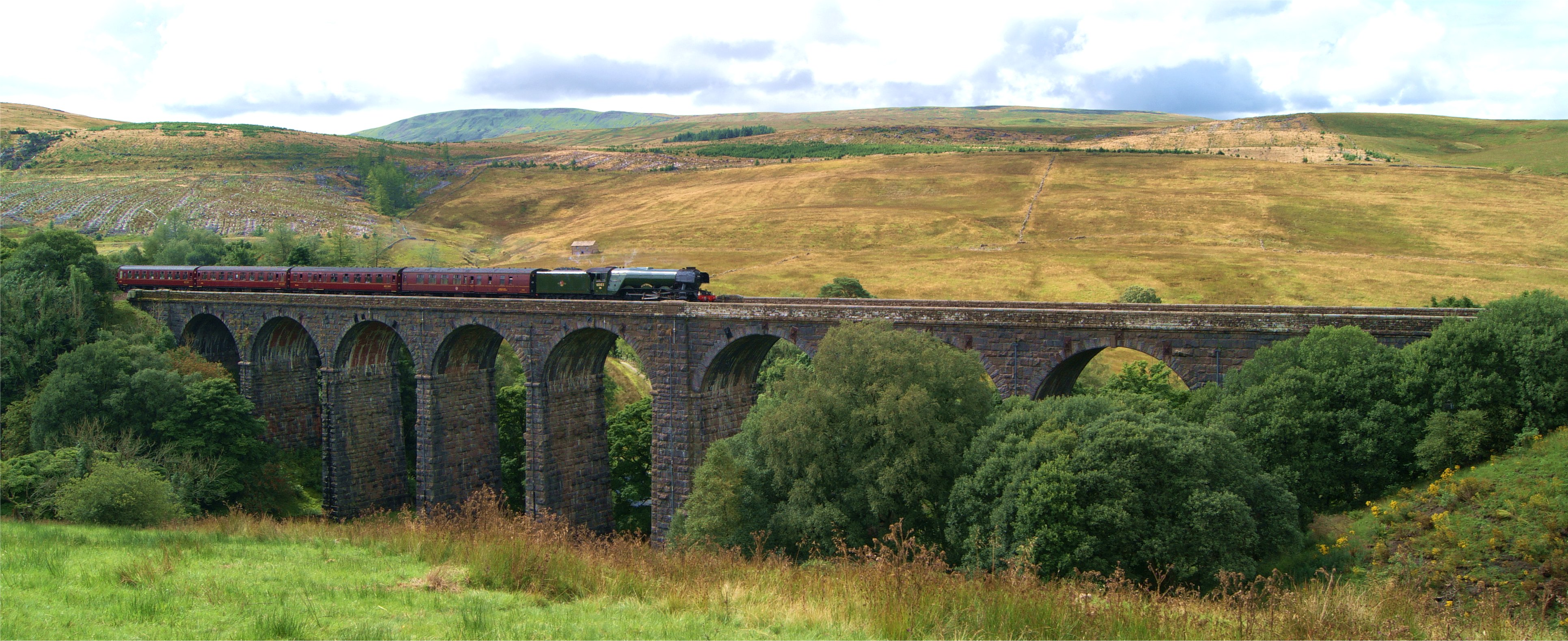
The Flying Scotsman crosses Dent Head Viaduct, August 2021

Water troughs were laid between the tracks at Garsdale, enabling steam engines to take water without stopping.

The remains of the navvies' camp at Rise Hill Tunnel were investigated by Channel 4's Time Team in 2008, for a programme that was broadcast on 1 February 2009.

=== Operation ===
The line opened for goods traffic in August 1875 with the first passenger trains starting in April 1876. The cost of the line was £3.6 million (equivalent to £360 million in 2025) – 50 per cent above the estimate and a colossal sum for the time.

For some time the Midland dominated the market for London-Glasgow traffic, providing more daytime trains than its rival. In 1923 the Midland and the LNWR were both merged into the new London, Midland and Scottish Railway. In the new company, the disadvantages of the Midland's route were clear – its steeper gradients and greater length meant it could not compete on speed from London to Glasgow, especially as Midland route trains had to make more stops to serve major cities in the Midlands and Yorkshire. The Midland had long competed on the extra comfort it provided for its passengers but this advantage was lost in the merged company.

After nationalisation in 1948, the pace of rundown quickened. It was regarded as a duplicate line, and control over the through London-Glasgow route was split over several regions which made it hard to plan popular through services. Mining subsidence affected speeds through the East Midlands and Yorkshire. In 1962, the Thames–Clyde Express travelling via the S&C took almost nine hours from London to Glasgow – over the West Coast Main Line the journey length was 7 hours 20 minutes.

In 1963, the Beeching Report into the restructuring of British Rail recommended the withdrawal of all passenger services from the line. Some smaller stations had closed in the 1950s. Although the Beeching recommendations were shelved, it is clear that closure of the line was planned as early as the late 1960s. Such closure is referred to in paragraph 40 of the official report into the accident involving two goods trains between Horton-in-Ribblesdale and Selside on 30 October 1968, by Lt. Colonel I.K.A. McNaughton:

"... Even if the Settle and Carlisle line were planned to form part of the long term railway network of the country, it would still come fairly low in the priority list for installation of AWS; this route, however, is planned for closure within the next few years ..."

In May 1970 all stations except for Settle and Appleby West were closed, and its passenger service cut to two trains a day in each direction, leaving mostly freight.

Few express passenger services continued to operate, The Waverley from London St Pancras to Edinburgh Waverley via Nottingham ended in 1968, while the Thames–Clyde Express from London to Glasgow Central via Leicester, lasted until 1975. Night sleepers from London to Glasgow continued until 1976. After that a residual service from Glasgow – cut back at Nottingham (three trains each way) – survived until May 1982.

=== Threat of closure ===
During the 1970s, the S&C suffered from a lack of investment, and most freight traffic was diverted onto the electrified West Coast Main Line. The condition of many viaducts and tunnels deteriorated due to lack of investment. DalesRail began operating services to closed stations on summer weekends in 1974. These were promoted by the Yorkshire Dales National Park Authority to encourage ramblers.

In the early 1980s, the S&C was carrying only a handful of trains per day, and British Rail decided the cost of renewing the viaducts and tunnels would be prohibitively expensive, given the small amount of traffic carried on the line. In June 1981 a protest group, the Friends of the Settle–Carlisle Line (FoSCL), held its inaugural meeting at Settle Town Hall and campaigned against the line's closure even before it was officially announced.

In 1984, closure notices were posted at the S&C's remaining stations. However, local authorities and rail enthusiasts joined and campaigned to save the S&C, pointing out that British Rail was ignoring the S&C's potential for tourism, ignoring the need for a diversionary route to the West Coast Main Line, and failing to promote through traffic from the Midlands and Yorkshire to Scotland.

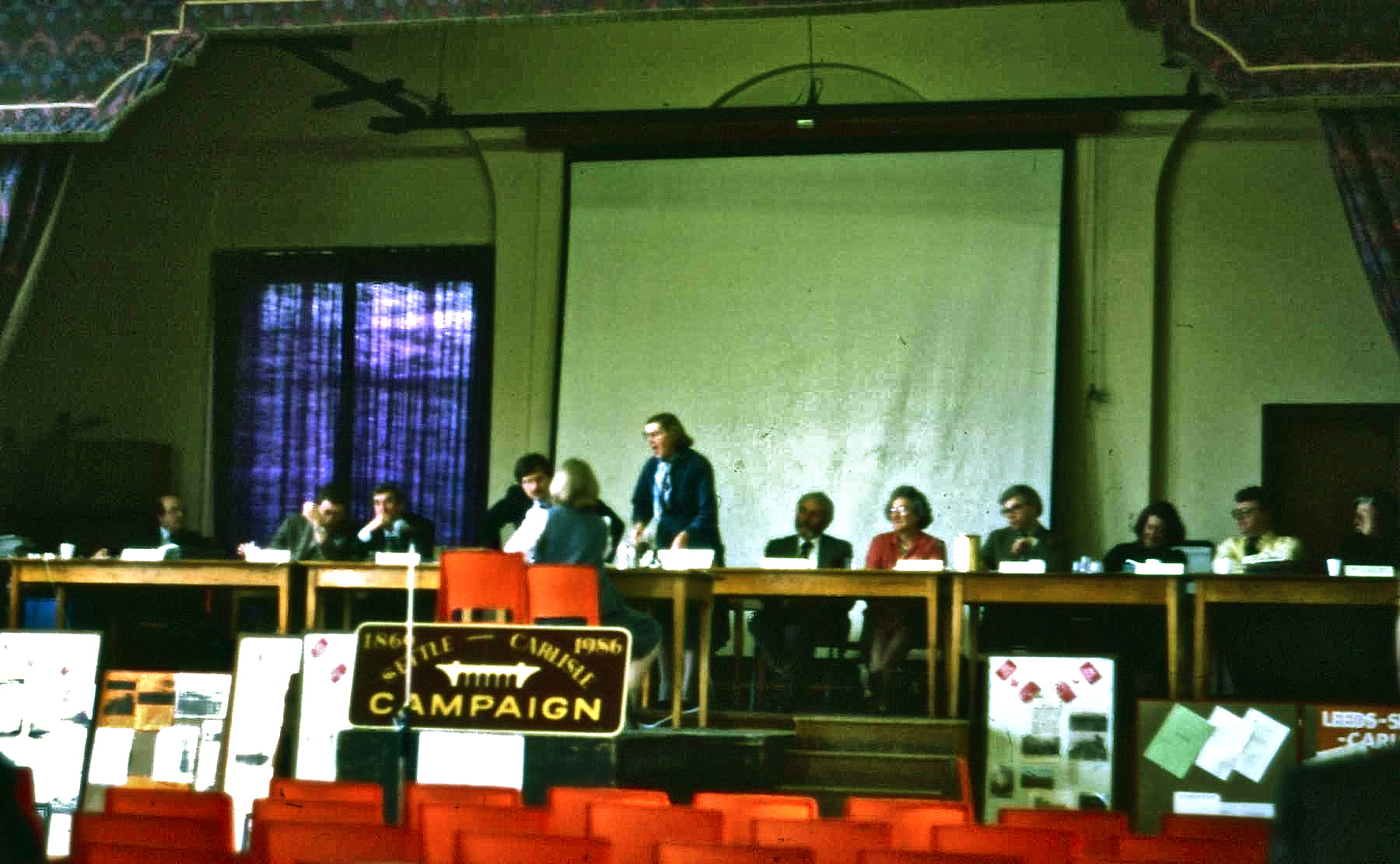
1986 Transport Users Consultative Committee hearing in Carlisle

There was outrage over the closure plan: critics pointed out that this was a main line, not a small branch railway. The campaign uncovered evidence that British Rail had mounted a dirty tricks campaign against the line, exaggerating the cost of repairs (£6 million for Ribblehead Viaduct alone) and diverting traffic away from the line in order to justify its closure plans, a process referred to as closure by stealth.

Publicity over British Rail's tactics succeeded in a huge increase in traffic. Journeys per year were 93,000 in 1983 when the campaign began, rising to 450,000 by 1989. As late as August 1988, the British Rail Board posted notices stating they had appointed Lazard Brothers to 'advise on the sale of the Settle–Carlisle line'. On 11 April 1989, the Secretary of State for Transport, Paul Channon, announced that consent for closure of the line and the associated Blackburn-Hellifield line would be refused. This was on the basis that, firstly, trial repairs to one span of the Ribblehead Viaduct had shown that it would be cheaper to repair the whole structure than had previously been anticipated and, secondly, the increased ridership of the line. British Rail estimated that revenue on the line was 40% higher than in 1988–89. Subsequently, British Rail started to repair the deteriorating tunnels and viaducts.

=== 2015–2017 temporary closures ===
The winter of 2015–16 saw services over the route repeatedly disrupted by flooding and a serious landslip north of Armathwaite. Storm Desmond saw the line closed for several days at the beginning of December by flooding at several different locations, while the landslip at Eden Brows near Armathwaite resulted in the closure of the southbound line between Cumwhinton and Culgaith from 29 January 2016 to allow the damaged embankment to be inspected and stabilised. Problems had first been reported in mid-December 2015, but repairs were carried out and services resumed on 22 December. Single-line working was in place for several days over the northbound line while the remedial work continued and an emergency timetable was in operation. Further ground movement at the site (due to the base of the embankment being eroded by the river and the saturated nature of the fill material originally used to construct the embankment) led to the complete closure of the line between Appleby & Carlisle on 9 February 2016, with buses replacing trains over this section. Repairs to the affected section entailed building a 100m-long piled retaining wall and support platform for the track and stabilising the embankment beneath it; work began in July 2016 and was completed in March 2017. The line between Appleby and Armathwaite was reopened to traffic on 27 June 2016 on a temporary timetable; the repair project was estimated to cost £23 million. In February 2017, to celebrate the forthcoming reopening of the line on 31 March, scheduled trains drawn by 60163 Tornado ran in February, the first regular mainline scheduled service in England using steam for more than half a century. The service carried more than 5,500 passengers during its three days of operation.

In March 2017, work on the piled wall and trackbed at Eden Brows was completed and the work site was handed back to Network Rail, allowing the infrastructure operator to recommission and test the track and signalling system over the affected section ahead of the reopening date. On 31 March 2017 LNER Class A3 Pacific No. 60103 Flying Scotsman operated a special trip to Carlisle and back to celebrate the full opening to traffic.

=== Statue of Ruswarp ===
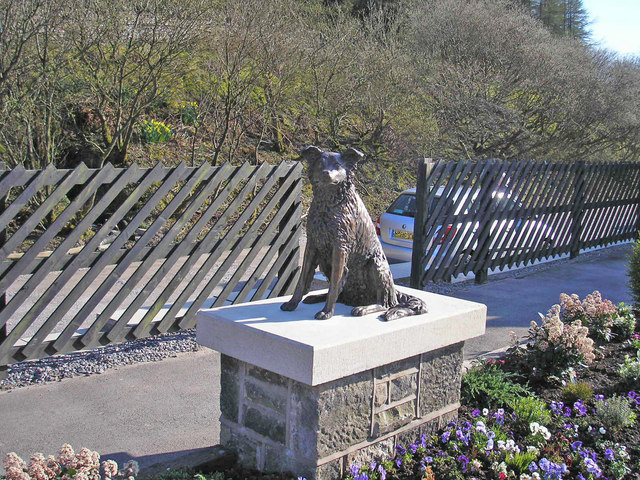
Statue of Ruswarp at Garsdale railway station

In 2009, a statue of the Border Collie Ruswarp (pronounced Russup) was sited on the platform of the refurbished Garsdale railway station. The commemorative sculpture, funded by public subscription, was made by sculptor Joel Walker and cast in bronze. It celebrates the saving of the railway line which was coordinated by the Friends of the Settle to Carlisle Line, whose first secretary, Graham Nuttall, was a keen hillwalker; his dog Ruswarp signed the petition to save the line with his paw print. On 20 January 1990 Graham Nuttall had gone missing. He and Ruswarp had bought day return tickets from Burnley to Llandrindod Wells to go walking in the Welsh Mountains, but they never returned. Searches in the Elan Valley and Rhayader found nothing until on 7 April 1990, a lone walker found Nuttall's body beside a stream. The 14-year-old Ruswarp was nearby, having stayed by his master's body for 11 weeks in winter weather; he was so weak that he had to be carried down the mountain. His veterinary fees were paid by the RSPCA, who awarded him their Animal Medallion and collar for 'vigilance' and Animal Plaque for 'intelligence and courage'. He died shortly after Nuttall's funeral.

=== Recent developments ===
Northern Rail advertisement for the Settle–Carlisle line

Anglo-Scottish expresses have not been fully restored. The former regional franchisee Arriva Trains Northern initiated a twice daily Leeds–Glasgow Central service in 1999 (calling at Settle, Appleby, Carlisle, Lockerbie and Motherwell). The service was withdrawn at the behest of the Strategic Rail Authority in 2003, and there remains no link from Yorkshire or the East Midlands to Glasgow over the line. The link from Lancashire operates on Sundays during the summer months for the benefit of ramblers under the DalesRail brand. In recent years, due to congestion on the West Coast Main Line, much rail-freight traffic is using the S&C once again. Gypsum is transported from Hull Docks and Drax Power Station to the British Gypsum plasterboard factory at Kirkby Thore, and coal was carried to power stations in Yorkshire and Fife from the Hunterston coal terminal until 2016. Major engineering work was needed to upgrade the line to the standards required for such heavy freight traffic and additional investment made to reduce the length of signal sections.

In July 2009, work to stabilise a length of embankment near Kirkby Thore and remove a long-standing permanent speed restriction was undertaken.

As of 2013, the line has experienced an upturn in fortunes. Eight formerly closed stations have reopened and in 2012 1.2 million passenger journeys were recorded compared with just 90,000 in 1983. Ribblehead station features a special visitor centre. The line is an important diversionary route from the electrified West Coast Main Line during engineering works. However, as the line is not electrified, electric trains such as Pendolinos need to be hauled by diesel locomotives (typically a Class 57 Thunderbird) along the diversion section.

In April 2014, the 25th anniversary of the line's reprieve was celebrated by the running of a special train from Leeds to Carlisle over the route. This conveyed many of the campaigners who fought to save the line and called at Settle station, where a ceremony was held to commemorate the announcement made on 11 April 1989 that the line would be kept open. Michael Portillo, the Minister of State with responsibility for railways in the Thatcher government of the time (and who made the official announcement regarding the line in parliament) attended the celebrations.

== Today ==
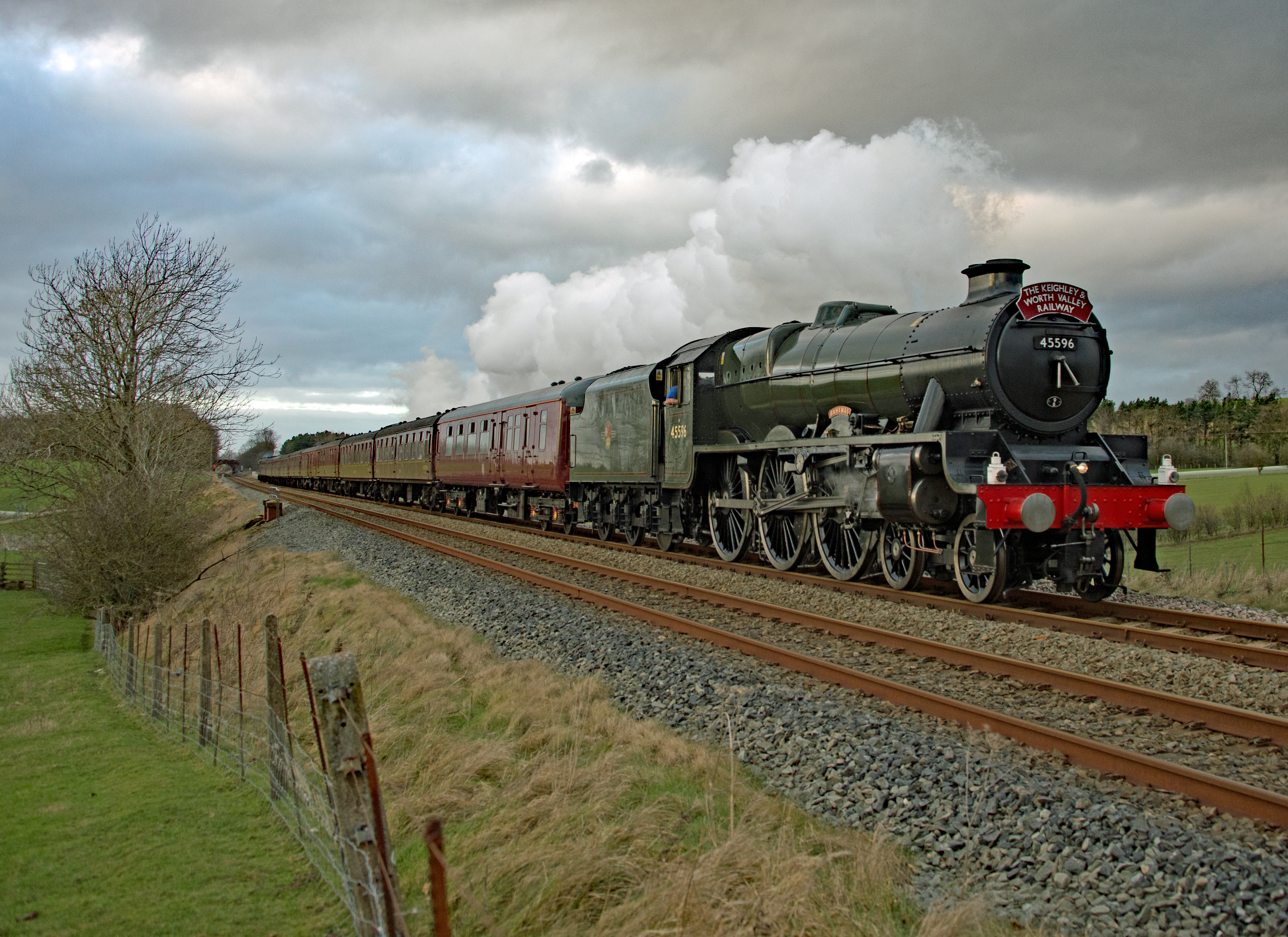
45596 Bahamas approaching Long Marton heading south along the Settle and Carlisle Line in 2019.

From April 2016, Arriva Rail North Ltd took over all passenger services on the line from the previous operator which was run by Serco & Abellio. As part of the new franchise agreement with the DfT, service improvements were implemented from the May 2018 timetable change with one extra weekday service each way and two extra trains each way on Sundays. Arriva also began work to install digital information screens and ticket machines at each station in early 2019. As from 1 March 2020, passenger services are now operated by the publicly run company Northern Trains, who have maintained this level of service.

In March 2020, it was discovered that the 144-year-old Ribblehead Viaduct required further major repairs. There were numerous defects to the masonry which had opened up, and pieces of debris had fallen off the edge. Alongside issues with the masonry there were fractures to the arches and piers, together with problems with the drainage system. Repair work was completed in April 2021 at a cost of around £2.1 million.

The line was blocked once again in October 2022, when the rear half of a northbound Clitheroe to Carlisle Yard freight train derailed as it was leaving the line at Petteril Bridge Junction, on the outskirts of Carlisle on Wednesday 19 October. Five of the fourteen tank wagons in the consist left the rails, damaging the track, signalling equipment and river bridge. The stranded wagons (one of which toppled into the river) were recovered in mid-November using a heavy lift crane, after which the bridge was repaired/reinforced and new track, points and signal cables were installed to replace those damaged in the accident. The line reopened to traffic on schedule on 7 December 2022.

=== Steam excursions and Diesel charter services ===
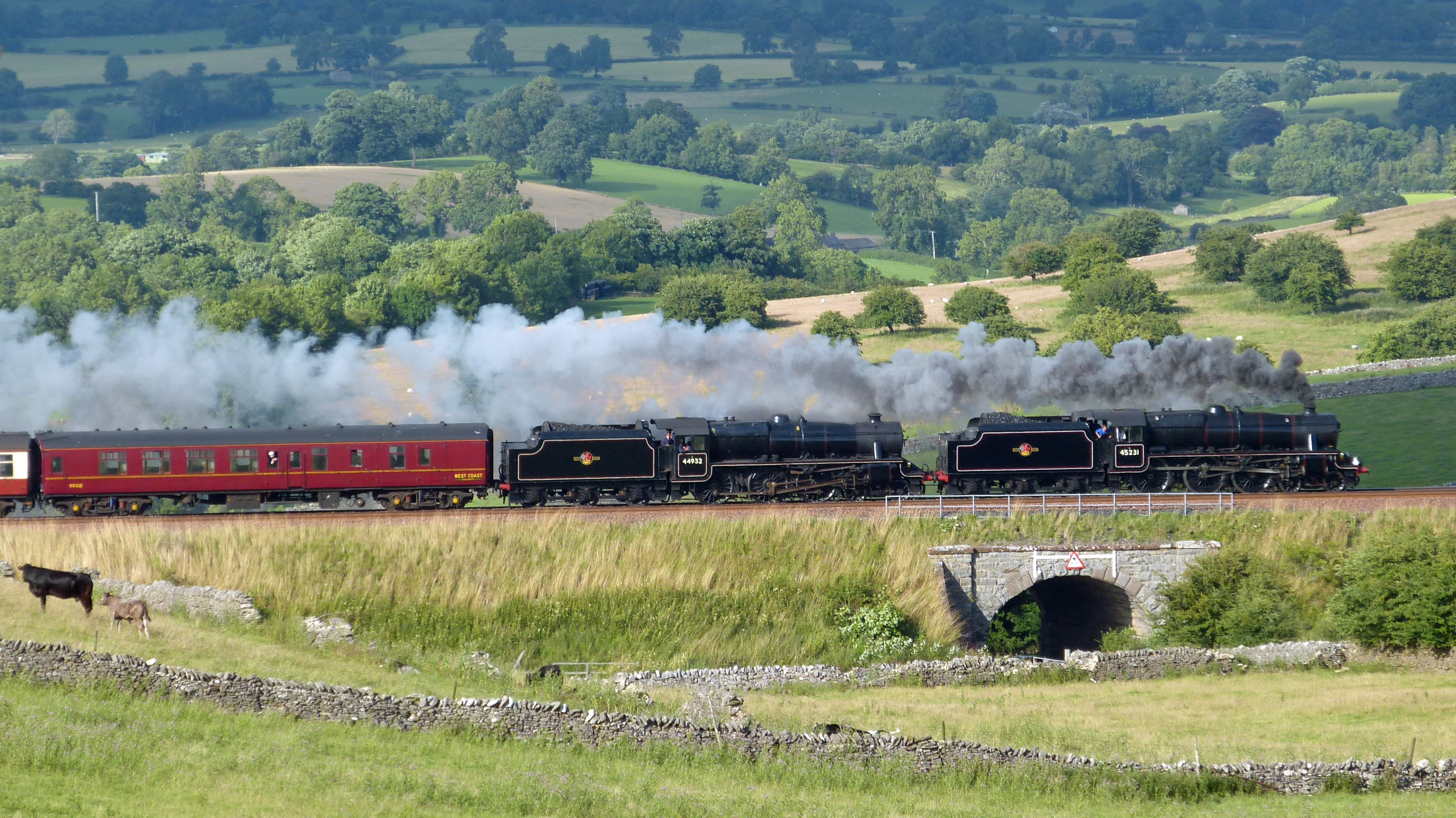
45231 and 44932 running south down the S&C in 2013, celebrating the 45th anniversary of the Fifteen Guinea Special

Since the privatisation of British Rail, the Settle and Carlisle line has proved to be popular with charter train operating companies like West Coast Railways, which operate excursion trains using steam locomotives. Classes of LMS locomotive that have run over the line vary from express to mixed traffic, such as Black Fives, Jubilees, Coronations, Princess Royals and even goods engines like the 8Fs. Non-LMS engines that would never have worked on the line during the days of steam include 4468 Mallard, 5043 Earl of Mount Edgcumbe, 5972 Olton Hall, 35018 British India Line, 60103 Flying Scotsman and 60163 Tornado.

Between 19 July and 9 September 2021, Rail Charter Services operated The Staycation Express, with the service running between Skipton, Settle, Appleby and Carlisle. Running four times a day, every day except Friday, this fully refurbished HST 125, features five, all first class coaches and offers travellers an alternative method of enjoying the route. Statesman Rail also run occasional services with restored Class 47 diesels and Pullman coaches.

=== Reconnection to quarries ===
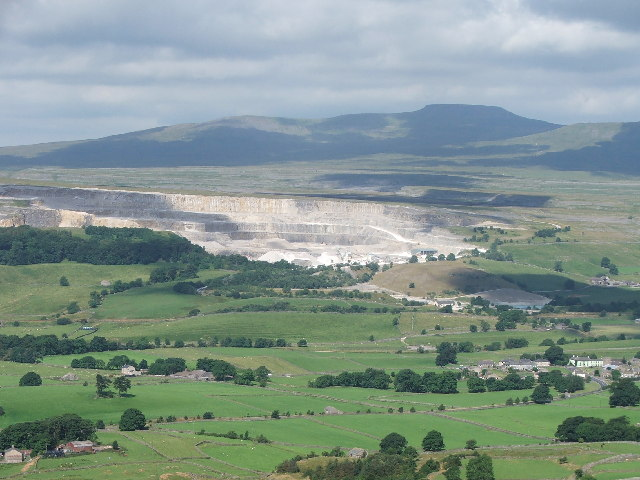
Horton Quarry

In July 2015 it was announced that the stone quarries at Arcow and Dry Rigg would be reconnected to the line via north-facing points. Stone from both of these quarries is in demand for road building due to its high Polished Stone Value (PSV) (Note: Polished Stone Value - PSV is the measure of how skid-resistant the stone is.) and would be taken out of the Yorkshire Dales National Park by freight train instead of lorries. The work was undertaken during the last quarter of 2015 with the link opening to traffic in 2016.

Additionally, work to reconnect the neighbouring Horton Quarry, via relaid sidings immediately south of Horton-in-Ribblesdale station, was completed in July 2025. The sidings had last been used in the early 1980s.

=== Rolling stock ===
Passenger services are usually operated by Class 158 Diesel Multiple Units. Class 150 units have also been used occasionally in the past (as substitutes for the booked 158s) since a batch of the units were transferred to Northern Rail from London Midland in the autumn of 2011. These are also used on the weekend "Yorkshire Dales Explorer" services from Rochdale via Manchester Victoria and Blackburn, along with Class 156 units (this twice-daily service to/from Ribblehead replaced the Sundays-only "DalesRail" service in June 2024). Class 153 single-car units were also used on the line up until 2021, but are no longer in service with the operator.

== Route ==
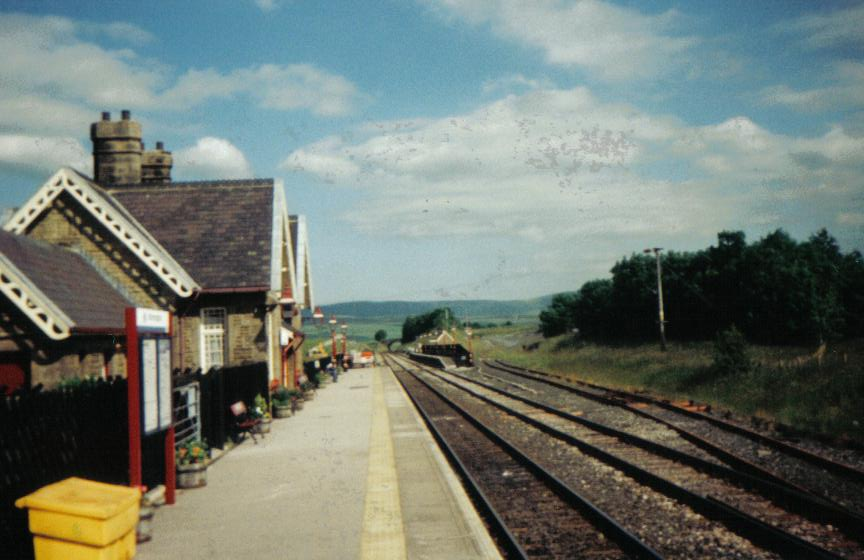
Ribblehead station

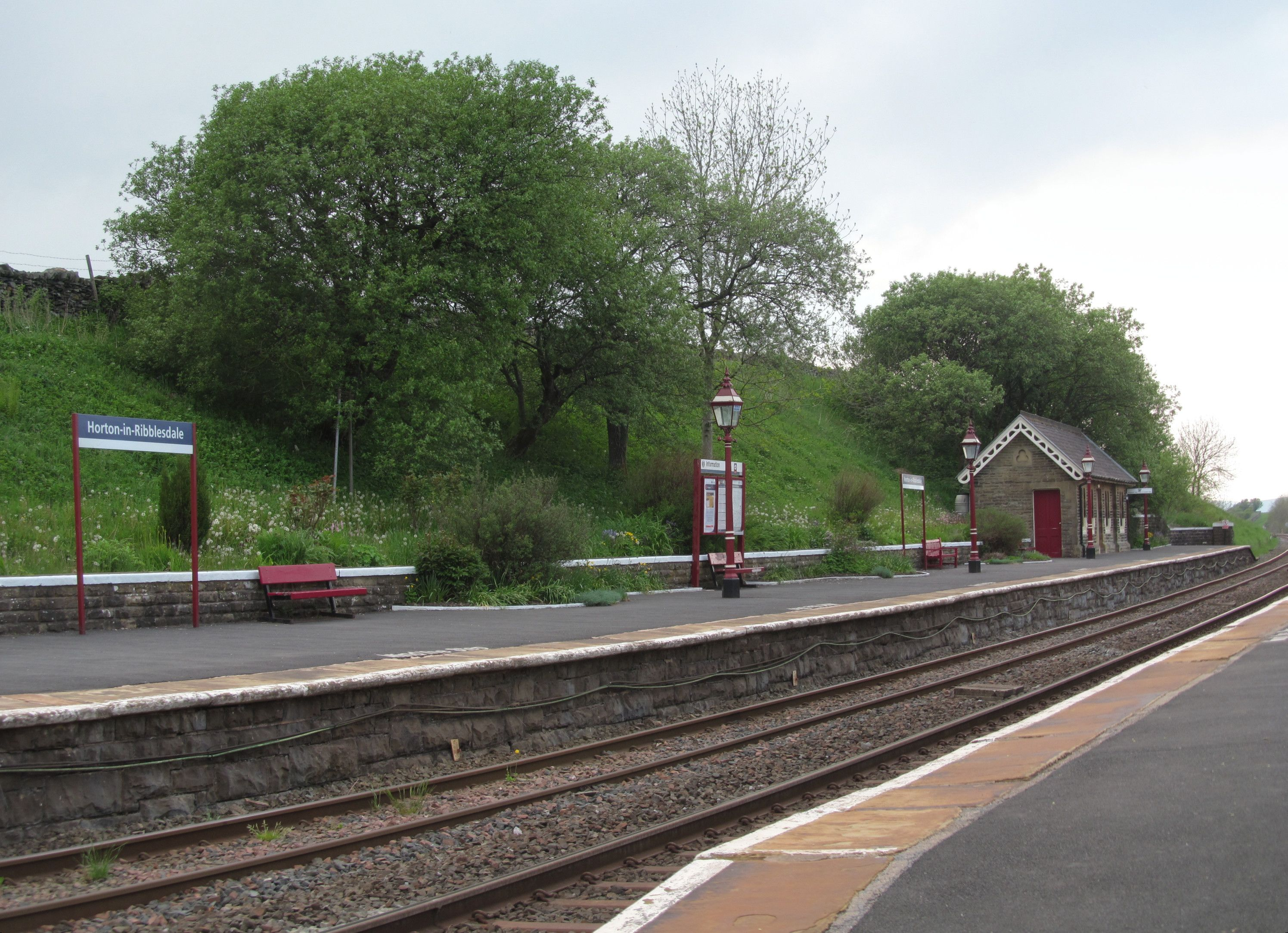
Horton-in-Ribblesdale station

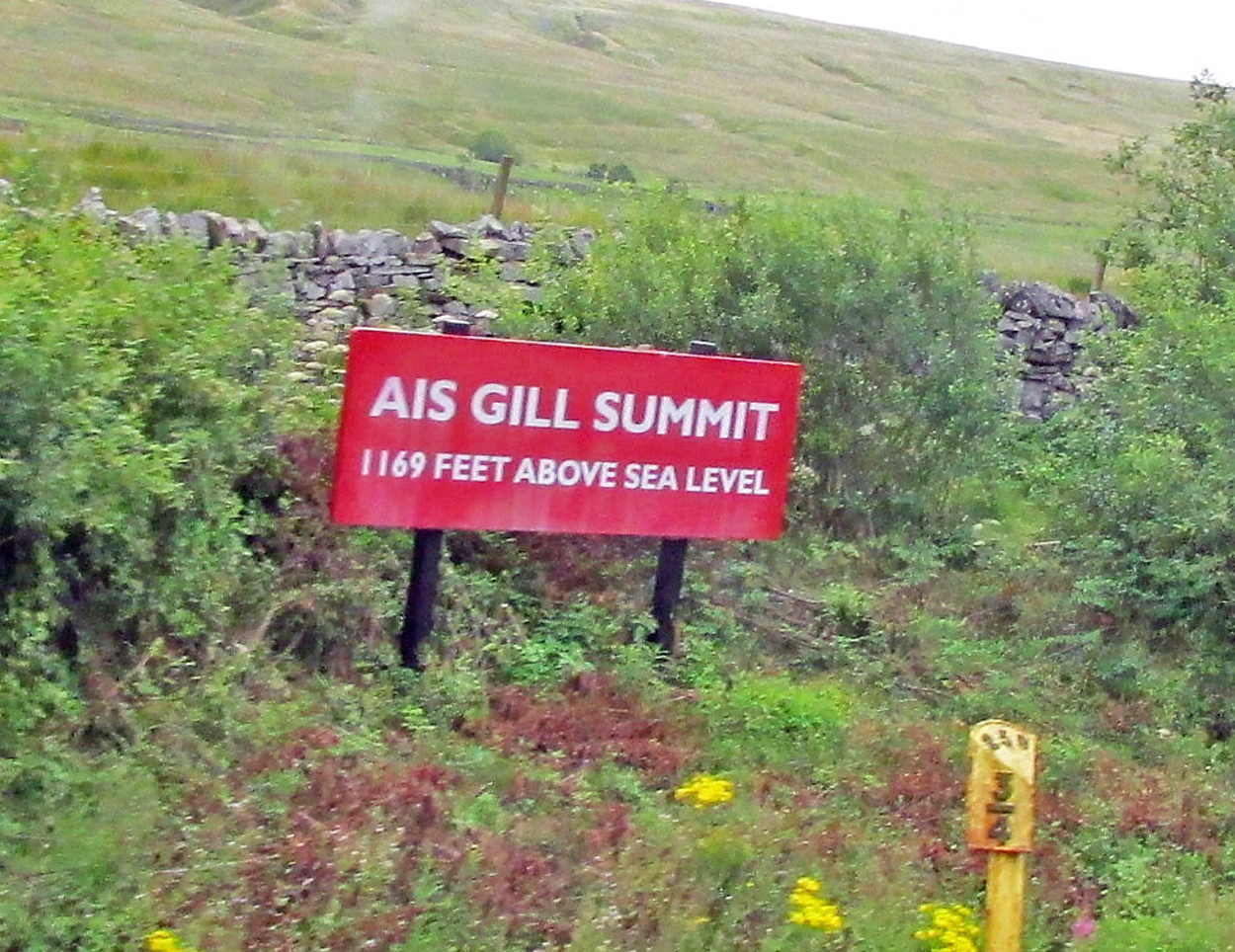
Ais Gill summit notice board in 2017 painted to resemble Midland Railway colours

- Settle Junction – the start of the line. Site of the junction with the Leeds to Morecambe Line and a short-lived (1876–77) passenger station.
- Settle
  - Taitlands Tunnel (now called Stainforth Tunnel)
- Horton in Ribblesdale
- Ribblehead – here is the Ribblehead Viaduct (originally named Batty Moss Viaduct) 440 yd (396 m), with 24 piers
  - Blea Moor – here is Blea Moor signal box and loop. Blea Moor signal box is the remotest signal box in England
  - Blea Moor Tunnel 2629 yd (2366 m) long
  - here are the Dent Head & Arten Gill viaducts.
- Dent (4.5 miles outside the village of Dent)
  - Dent is the highest railway station in England.
  - Rise Hill Tunnel
  - here were the highest water troughs in the United Kingdom. Steam locomotives were able to pick up water from these troughs whilst still moving.
  - here was Hawes Junction engine shed
- Garsdale – originally named Hawes Junction then Hawes Junction & Garsdale.
  - At Hawes station, on the Hawes branch to the east of the main line, there was an end-on-junction with the North Eastern Railway (NER) line across the Pennines to Northallerton (now the Wensleydale Railway).
  - here is Dandry Mire Viaduct
  - On the next stretch, there were three tunnels (Moorcock Tunnel, Shotlock Hill Tunnel and Birkett Tunnel).
  - On this stretch also was the summit of the line at Ais Gill, 1169 ft (350 m) ASL. From 1954, the summit was marked by a vitreous enamel sign.
- Kirkby Stephen - There were two stations here, one (Kirkby Stephen West) for the Midland line and Kirkby Stephen East for the NER (the latter's line from Darlington to Tebay). The two stations are about half a mile apart. The Midland station also served the village of Ravenstonedale
- Crosby Garrett (closed 1952)
- Ormside (closed 1952)
- Appleby – as with Kirkby Stephen, there were separate stations for the Midland (Appleby West) and NE lines (Appleby East), with a siding connection. The NE line was the branch known as the Eden Valley Railway between Kirkby Stephen and Eden Valley Junction on the West Coast Line near Clifton
- Long Marton (closed 1970)
- New Biggin (closed 1970)
- Culgaith (closed 1970)
  - there are two tunnels between these stations
- Langwathby
- Little Salkeld (closed 1970)
  - here is Lazonby Tunnel
- Lazonby and Kirkoswald
  - there are three more tunnels between these two stations
- Armathwaite
- Cotehill (closed 1952)
- Cumwhinton (closed 1956)
- Scotby (closed 1942 – not the same station as that of the same name on the adjoining Tyne Valley line)
- Petterill Bridge Junction – junction with the Newcastle – Carlisle line and the end of Midland Railway metals.
- Carlisle: the station – full title Carlisle Citadel – was owned jointly by the LNWR and the Caledonian Railway: the Midland (among others) was a "tenant Company".

== Accidents ==
- 1910 – Hawes Junction rail crash; 12 killed, 17 injured.
- 1913 – Ais Gill rail accident (1913); 16 killed, 38 injured.
- 1918 – Little Salkeld rail accident; 7 killed.
- 1930 – Culgaith rail accident; 2 killed, 8 injured.
- 1933 – Little Salkeld station collision; 1 killed, 35 injured.
- 1952 – Blea Moor derailment 34 injured.
- 1960 – Settle rail crash; 5 killed, 8 injured.
- 1968 – Horton rail crash; Major damage, no fatalities; 2 injured.
- 1995 – Ais Gill rail accident (1995); 1 killed.
- 1999 – Crosby Garrett rail accident.

== In popular culture ==
In 1983, Border Television released a film documentary named 'Steam on the Settle & Carlisle'. It featured a trip from Carlisle to Settle on the "Cumbrian Mountain Express" hauled by LNER A4 Sir Nigel Gresley (at the time in its LNER livery and number 4498). SR West Country class City of Wells and SR class LN Lord Nelson also made appearances towards the end, while LMS Princess Coronation Class 6229 Duchess of Hamilton (in un-streamlined form) was seen at the start and towards the end. In March 2016 a fifty-minute colour documentary "The Long Drag", made in 1962–3 by the Halifax Cinema Club was released for free viewing on the British Film Institute website The British Film Institute website also hosts a 1985 Yorkshire Television documentary "The End of the Line" which is free to view online.

== See also ==
- Infrastructure of the Settle–Carlisle line

== Bibliography ==
- Abbott, Stan and Whitehouse, Alan (1994) [first published 1990] The line that refused to die. Hawes: Leading Edge. ISBN 0-948135-43-3
- Baughan P E (1966) The Midland Railway North of Leeds
- Houghton F W & Foster W H (1948) The Story of the Settle – Carlisle line.
- Towler J (1990) The Battle for the Settle & Carlisle Platform 5 Publishing, Sheffield ISBN 1-872524-07-9
- Williams F S (1875, reprinted 1968) Williams' Midland Railway
