= Dales High Way =

Footpath in northern England

A Dales High Way
- The logo used on waymarks
- Length: 140 km (87 mi)
- Location: Northern England
- Trailheads: Saltaire, West Yorkshire53°50′13.6″N 1°47′23.7″W; Appleby-in-Westmorland, Cumbria54°34′39.8″N 2°29′28.2″W
- Use: Hiking
- Elevation change: 4,268 m (14,003 ft)
- Highest point: Ingleborough, 718 m (2,356 ft)
Trail map

The Dales High Way, named by its creators as A Dales High Way, is a long-distance footpath in northern England. It is 90 miles (140 km) long and runs from Saltaire in West Yorkshire to Appleby-in-Westmorland, Cumbria, roughly parallel to the line of the Settle and Carlisle Railway.

== Route ==
The Dales High Way starts at Saltaire, a World Heritage Site model village in the City of Bradford, West Yorkshire, built by Titus Salt on the River Aire. It climbs up over Ilkley Moor, passing the Twelve Apostles stone circle and the Swastika Stone, and drops down to the outskirts of Addingham before rising to follow high ground south of the A65 road, including Skipton Moor, and then enters the town of Skipton. From here it passes through Flasby and Hetton and crosses the inlet to Winterburn Reservoir before climbing to cross the watershed between Wharfedale and Airedale and drop to the bridge below Gordale Scar. It rises to the limestone pavement above Malham Cove, where it crosses the Pennine Way and continues across Kirkby Fell on the way to Settle.

From Settle the route follows Ribblesdale to Stainforth, then goes by way of Feizor and Wharfe before heading for the summit of Ingleborough, one of the Yorkshire Three Peaks and the highest point on the route at 724 metres (2,375 ft). From here it drops down to Chapel-le-Dale and runs below Whernside near the Ribblehead Viaduct, going alongside the railway before crossing Whernside's northern slopes to head for Dentdale and share the route of the Dales Way through Dent. It leaves the Dales Way and Dentdale to follow higher ground to the north to reach Sedbergh.

From Sedbergh the path traverses the Howgill Fells, passing over Calders and the highest point of the Howgills, The Calf (676 metres (2,218 ft)), before following the ridge over Hazelgill Knott down to cross the River Lune near Newbiggin-on-Lune. It climbs over Ravenstonedale Moor to cross the watershed into the catchment of the River Eden, dropping down to Great Asby and following Hoff Beck past Rutter Force and Hoff before crossing a final low ridge to reach Appleby-in-Westmorland.

The total ascent in the 90 miles of the route is 4,268 m (14,003 ft)

The route is roughly parallel to the Settle and Carlisle Railway, so walkers can walk sections of the path while using the railway stations at Saltaire, Ilkley (on the line to Bradford), Skipton, Gargrave Settle, Horton-in-Ribblesdale, Ribblehead, Dent (some 5 miles (8 km) from and 400 feet (120 m) above the village of that name), Garsdale (for Sedbergh), Kirkby Stephen and Appleby.

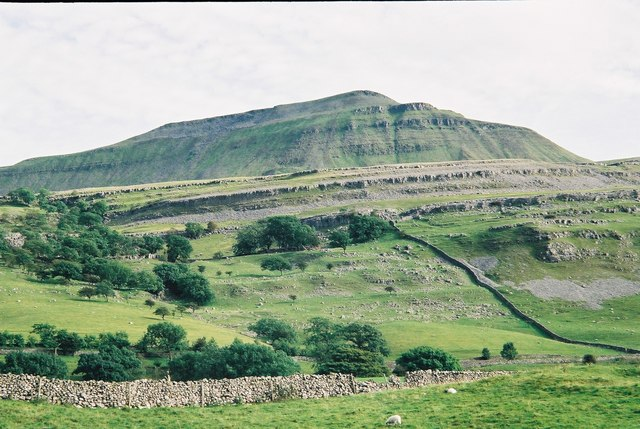
Ingleborough, the highest point of the path

== History ==
The path was conceived by husband and wife Tony and Chris Grogan in 2007, as a high-level alternative to the established Dales Way which runs from Ilkley to Windermere largely along Wharfedale and other valleys. They published two books, A Dales High Way: Route Guide (2008; 3rd rev ed 2020: ISBN 978-1911321064) and A Dales High Way: Companion (2009; 2nd ed, 2018: ISBN 978-1911321002).

== Waymarking ==
The path's waymark is a circular blue and purple symbol bearing the name and web address of the path. Waymarking began in June 2012 after extensive negotiations with the four local authorities through whose areas the path passes (Bradford, North Yorkshire, the Yorkshire Dales National Park and Cumbria), and was completed in 2013. Waymarks are placed where the route leaves metalled roads and at key junctions, but the route is not waymarked in open country; walkers need to use a map.

== Recognition ==
Since March 2014 the route has been shown on Ordnance Survey leisure maps, and it is recognised by the Long Distance Walkers Association. It is described on Bradford's official tourism site and the Yorkshire Dales National Park's website. An informal "Friends of A Dales High Way" group has been established.
