= Drybeck =

Hamlet in Cumbria, England

Coordinates: 54.532°N 2.513°W

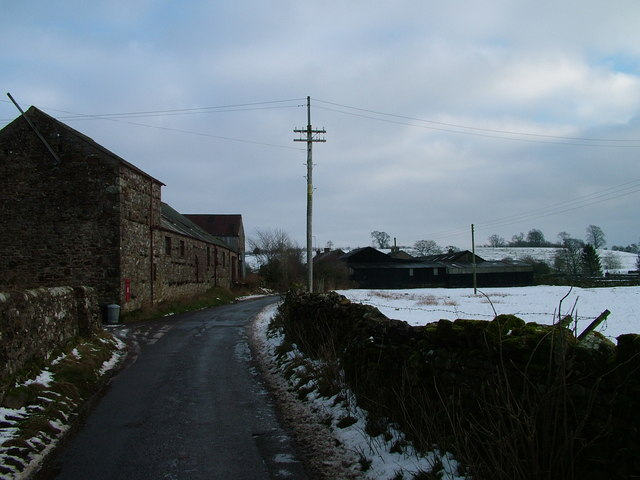
- Drybeck

- Location in Eden, Cumbria Location within Cumbria
- OS grid reference: NY668153
- Civil parish: Hoff
- Unitary authority: Westmorland and Furness
- Ceremonial county: Cumbria
- Region: North West
- Country: England
- Sovereign state: United Kingdom
- Post town: APPLEBY-IN-WESTMORLAND
- Postcode district: CA16
- Dialling code: 017683
- Police: Cumbria
- Fire: Cumbria
- Ambulance: North West
- UK Parliament: Westmorland and Lonsdale

Drybeck is a hamlet in the civil parish of Hoff, located in the Westmorland and Furness district of Cumbria, England. It is near the town of Appleby-in-Westmorland. It is on Dry Beck and has a hall called Drybeck Hall, there is also a Moor called Drybeck Moor. Circa 1870, it had a population of 87 as recorded in the Imperial Gazetteer of England and Wales.

There is no Church of England parish church in the civil parish of Hoff. Like the rest of the civil parish, Drybeck is within the ecclesiastical parish of Appleby St Lawrence.
