= Burrells =

Hamlet in Cumbria, England

Coordinates: 54.5587°N 2.4962°W

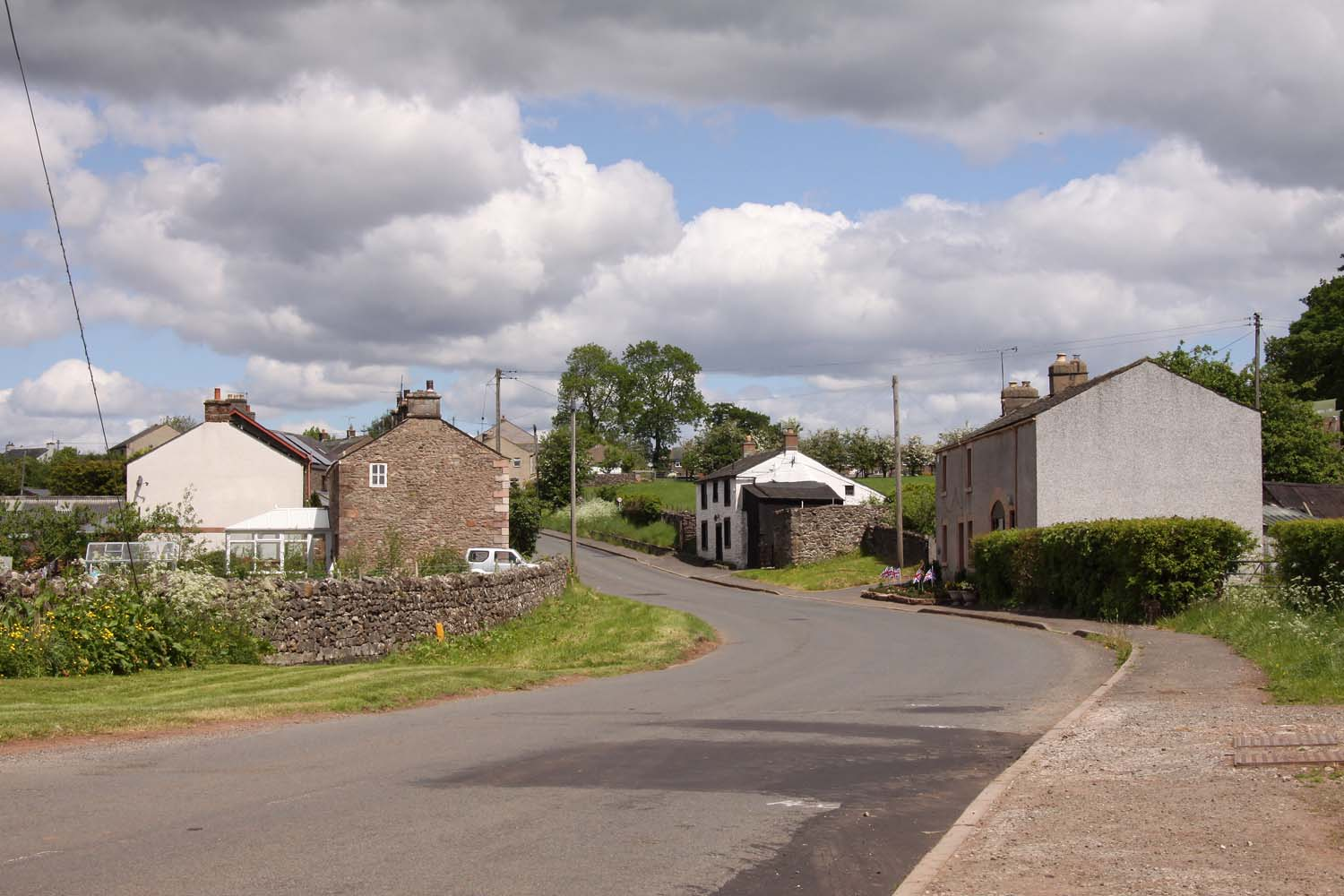
- The B6260 in Burrells

- Location in Eden, Cumbria Location within Cumbria
- OS grid reference: NY679182
- Civil parish: Hoff
- Unitary authority: Westmorland and Furness
- Ceremonial county: Cumbria
- Region: North West
- Country: England
- Sovereign state: United Kingdom
- Post town: APPLEBY-IN-WESTMORLAND
- Postcode district: CA16
- Dialling code: 017683
- Police: Cumbria
- Fire: Cumbria
- Ambulance: North West
- UK Parliament: Westmorland and Lonsdale

Burrells is a hamlet in the civil parish of Hoff, in the Westmorland and Furness district of the ceremonial county of Cumbria, England, located just south of Appleby-in-Westmorland on the B6260.

Historically a township in the Parish of Appleby in Westmorland, the hamlet contains both the Grade II listed Burrells House (early 19th century), as well as its Grade II listed barn, rebuilt in 1818. The now disused Hoff Quarry was an important local source of stone known geologically as Brockram, a breccia of cemented limestone and sandstone fragments dating from the Permian period.

From 1974 to 2023, Burrells was in the Eden district, before the Eden District Council was abolished and its functions transferred to Westmorland and Furness.

There is no Church of England parish church in the civil parish of Hoff. Like the rest of the civil parish, Burrells is within the ecclesiastical parish of Appleby St Lawrence.
