= Hoff Beck =

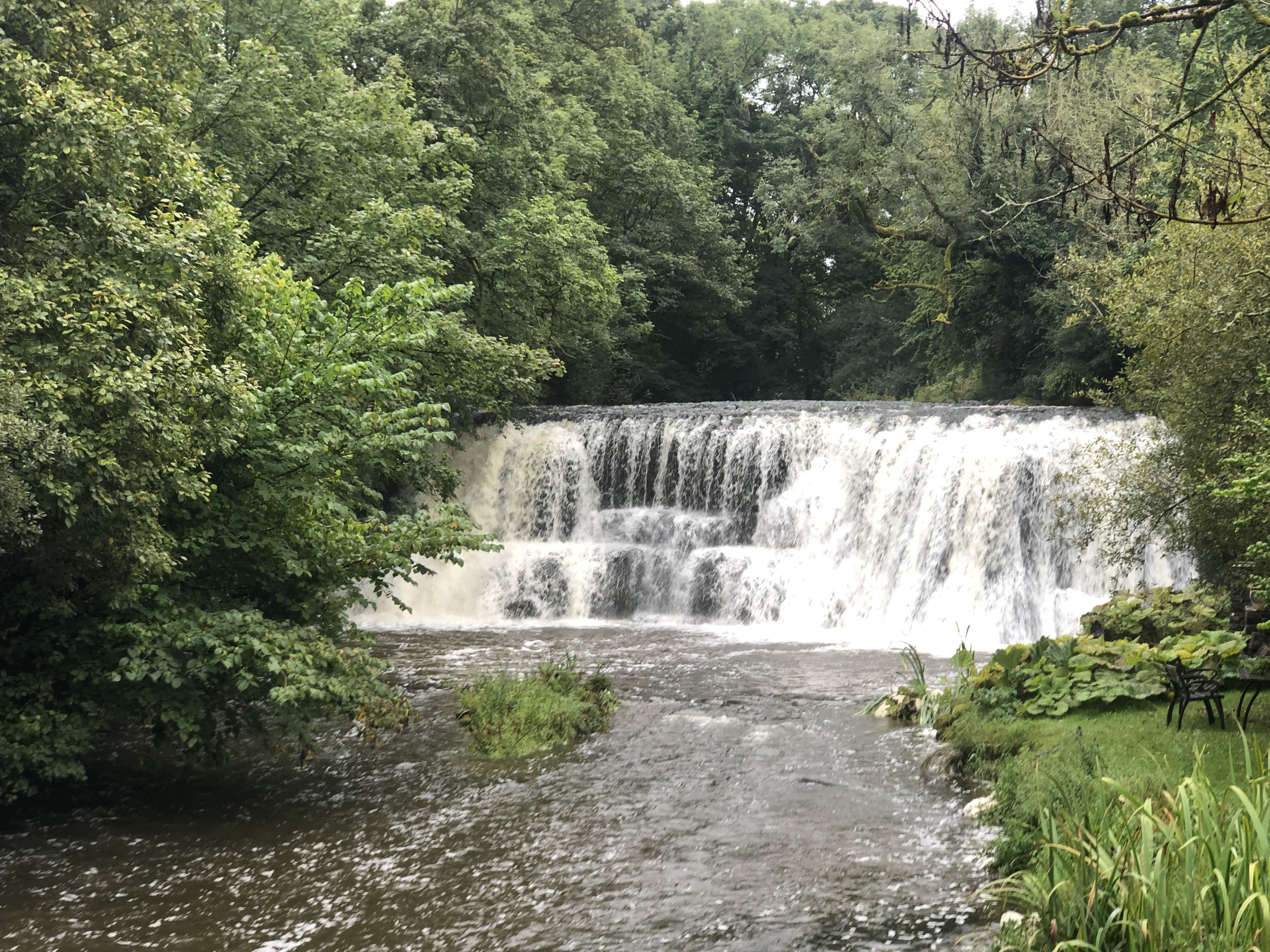
- Rutter Force with the Hoff Beck in spate

- Location of the mouth within Cumbria

Location
- Country: United Kingdom
- Constituent country: England
- County: Cumbria

Physical characteristics
- Mouth: River Eden
  - location: Colby
  - coordinates: 54.585°N 2.520°W

Hoff Beck is a stream that is a tributary of the River Eden in the English county of Cumbria. The headwaters of the beck lie within the Yorkshire Dales National Park and include the tributary streams of Dry Beck, Scale Beck, Asby Beck and Oak Beck.

The tributaries drain the Orton Fells and the north side of Great Asby Scar. Dry Beck flows into Scale Beck just to the south of the hamlet of Drybeck, whilst Asby Beck flows through the centre of the village of Great Asby. Hoff Beck itself forms with the confluence of Scale Beck and Asby Beck. Shortly after the confluence, the beck flows over Rutter Force, a 30-foot (9.1 m) high waterfall. Flowing north, the Hoff Beck receives the water of the Oak Beck before leaving the national park and passing the hamlet of Hoff. It then flows through the village of Colby before entering the River Eden downstream of the town of Appleby-in-Westmorland.

The Environment Agency defines three waterbodies for the Hoff Beck and its catchment area and tributaries. Hoff Beck (lower) comprises the area up to the confluence of the Scale Beck and Asby Beck, Hoff Beck (upper) comprises the area along the Asby Beck above that confluence, and Scale Beck comprises the area along the Scale Beck above that confluence. In 2019, Hoff Beck (upper) and Scale Beck were classified as having a good ecological status, whilst Hoff Beck (lower) had a moderate status. In 2022, Hoff Beck (lower) was classified as having a good status, whilst no classifications were recorded for the other two.

The Dales High Way, a 90-mile (140 km) long-distance footpath that runs from Saltaire, in West Yorkshire, to Appleby, follows the Hoff Beck from Rutter Force to Bandley Bridge, about halfway between Hoff and Colby.
