= Rutter Force =

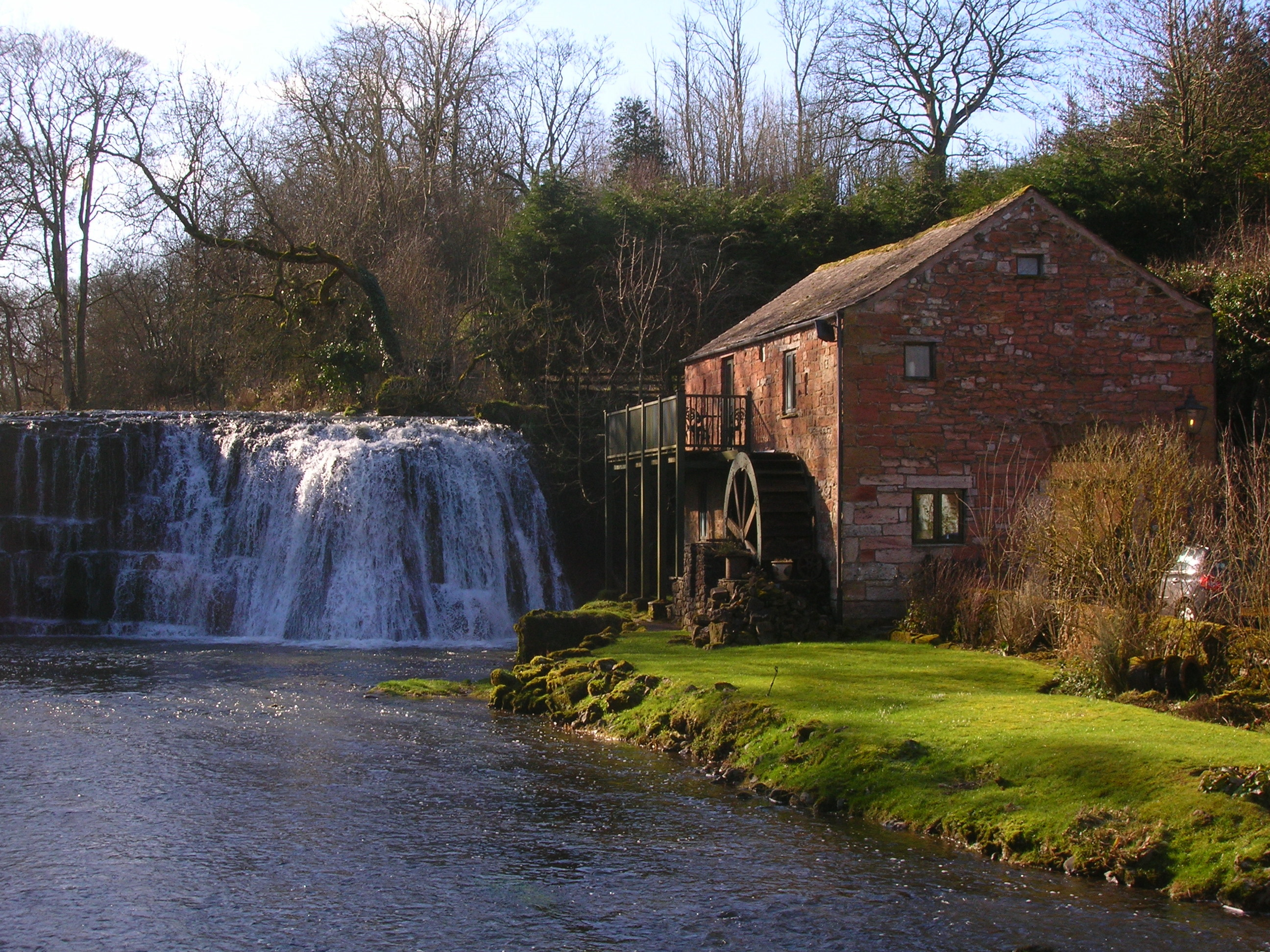
- Rutter Force and Mill
- Interactive map of Rutter Force
- Location: Cumbria
- OS grid: NY681158
- Coordinates: 54.536391°N 2.492963°W
- Total height: 30 feet (9.1 m)
- Watercourse: Hoff Beck

Rutter Force is a 30-foot (9.1 m) high horseshoe-shaped waterfall in the English county of Cumbria. Rutter Mill, a former watermill, and Rutter Mill Ford are adjacent to the falls. The falls lie on the Hoff Beck, which forms the boundary between the civil parishes of Hoff and Ormside and is a tributary of the River Eden. Although not actually in Yorkshire, the falls are in the far north-west corner of the designated area of the Yorkshire Dales National Park.

The falls are just 2 miles (3.2 km) south of the town of Appleby-in-Westmorland, and can be easily reached from there on foot or by car. The footpath route follows the last section of the Dales High Way, a 90-mile (140 km) long-distance footpath that runs from Saltaire, in West Yorkshire, to Appleby. Car parking is available by the ford, and a bridge provides a dry crossing for pedestrians.

Rutter Mill was first documented in 1579, when it was a corn mill using the head of water from the waterfall to power a waterwheel. When the repeal of the Corn Laws made corn milling unprofitable, it was converted to serve as a bobbin mill, and later a sawmill. From 1928 to 1952, the head of water was used to drive a turbine to generate electricity for the village of Great Asby. The original waterwheel was removed in 1940, but replaced with a replica in 1991. The mill is now used as holiday accommodation.

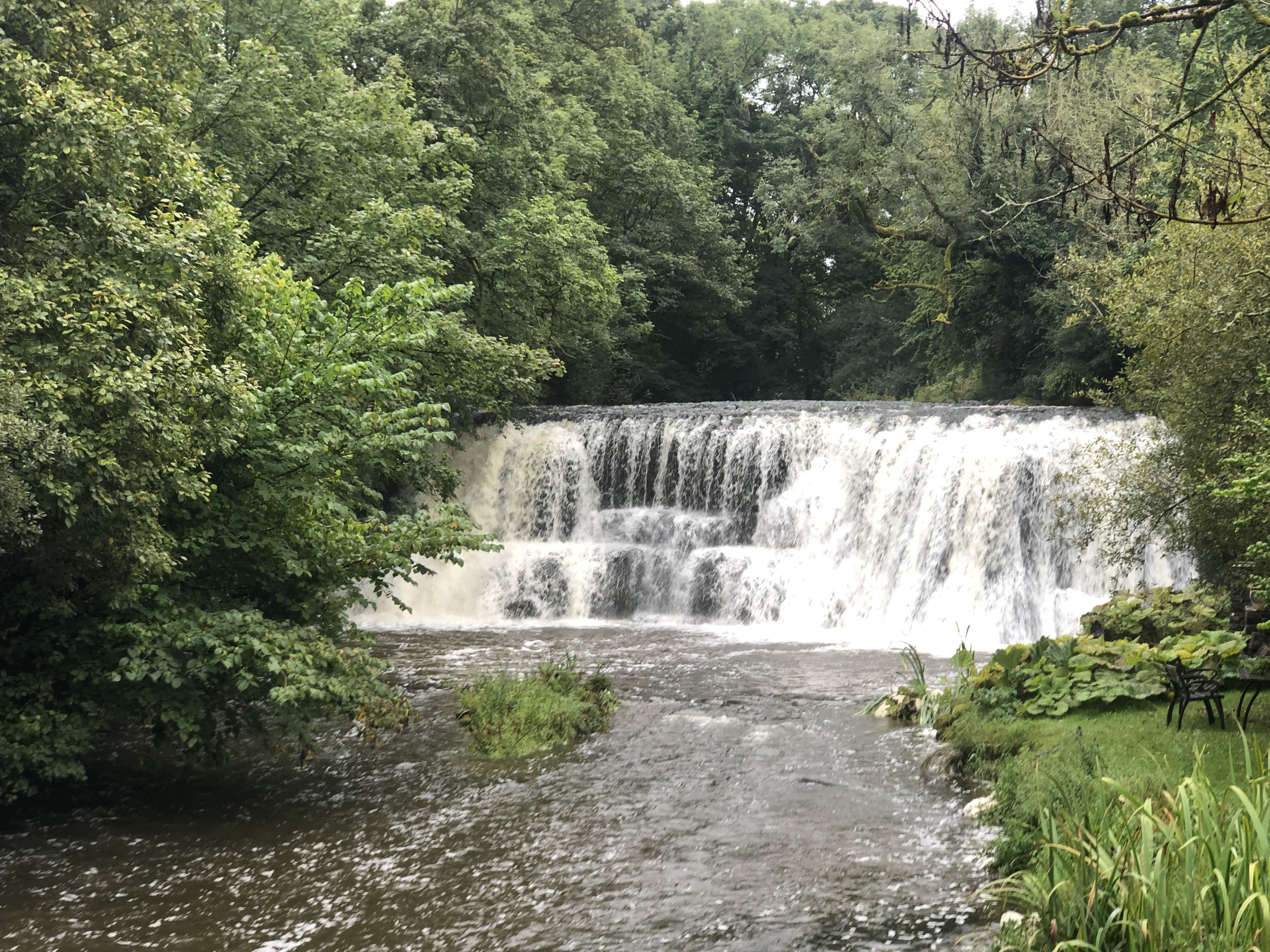
The falls in spate

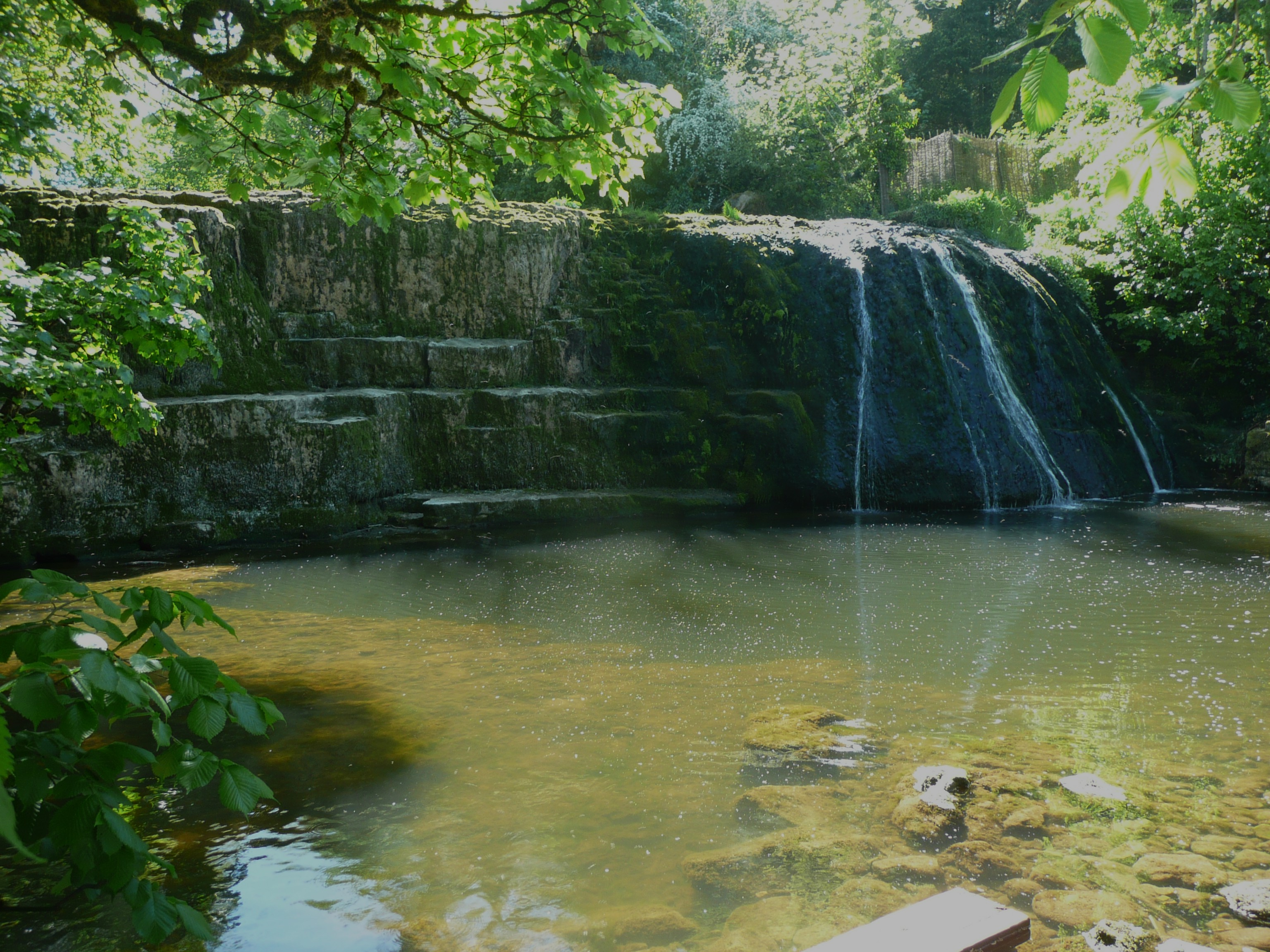
The falls in low water

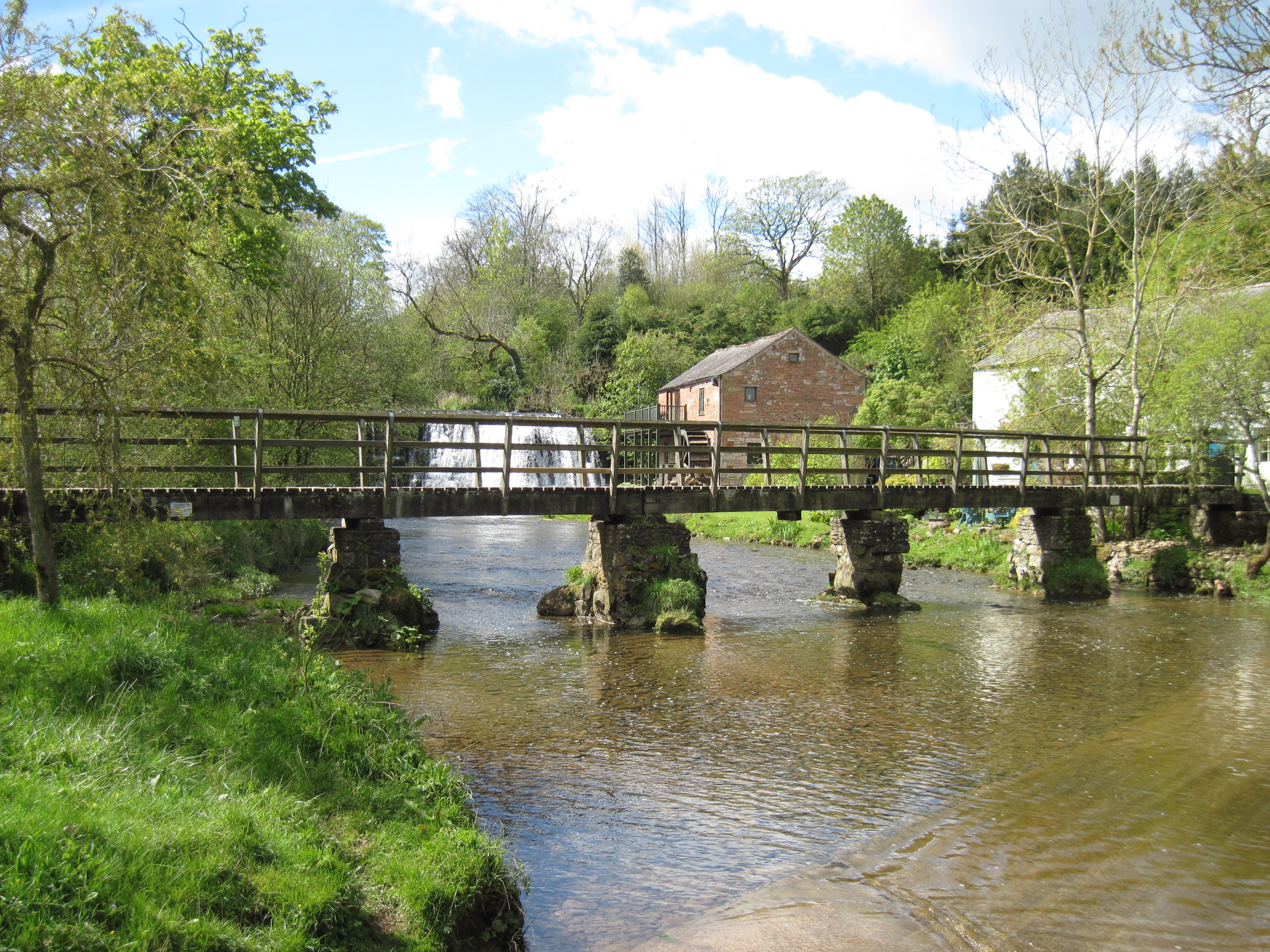
Ford, bridge, mill and falls
