= Shire Hall, Appleby-in-Westmorland =

Judicial building in Appleby-in-Westmorland, Cumbria, England

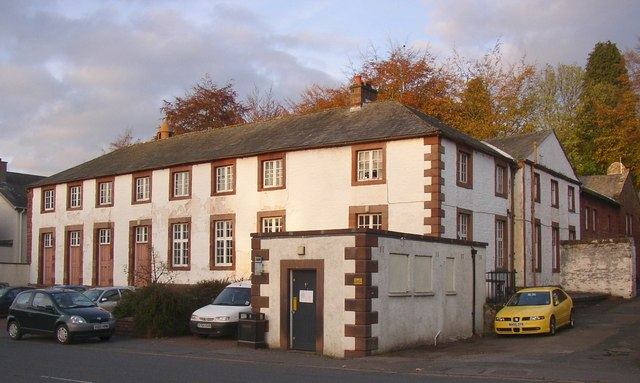
- Shire Hall, Appleby-in-Westmorland

- Shown in Cumbria
- 54.5779°N 2.4884°W
- Location: The Sands, Appleby-in-Westmorland

History
- Built: 1778

Site notes
- Architect: Daniel Benn
- Architectural style: Vernacular style

Listed Building – Grade II
- Official name: Shire Hall
- Designated: 30 March 2000
- Reference no.: 1380199

The Shire Hall is a municipal building in The Sands, Appleby-in-Westmorland, Cumbria, England. The shire hall, which is currently used as a dental surgery and business centre, is a Grade II listed building.

== History ==
The assize hearings for the County of Westmorland were held in the then-county town of Appleby, at the Castle until 1670, and then at the Moot Hall until 1778. However, in the early 1770s, the justices decided to commission a dedicated courthouse and the local lord of the manor, Sir James Lowther, agreed to make land available on Bongate (now known as The Sands).

The new building was designed by Lowther's agent, Daniel Benn, in the vernacular style, built in rubble masonry with a stucco finish, and completed in 1778. The design involved an asymmetrical main frontage of seven bays facing onto The Sands. There was a short flight of steps, running the full width of the frontage, in front of the building. The four bays on left contained tall doorways, while the three bays to the right contained tall windows. The first floor was fenestrated by square-shaped windows. All the windows incorporated ashlar stone surrounds and glazing bars. Internally, the principal room was the main courtroom. A gaol was built at the same time on a site to the rear of the courthouse but it was taken out of use in 1878.

The building was extended to the right, i.e. to the southeast, to create an extra bay in 1814. The building continued to serve as the assize court until the abolition of the assize courts under the Courts Act 1971. It then served as the local magistrates court, until the court hearings were transferred in March 1998.

The building was subsequently refurbished and converted for use as a dental surgery and business centre.

== See also ==
- Listed buildings in Appleby-in-Westmorland
