= Moot Hall, Appleby-in-Westmorland =

Municipal building in Appleby-in-Westmorland, Cumbria, England

The Moot Hall
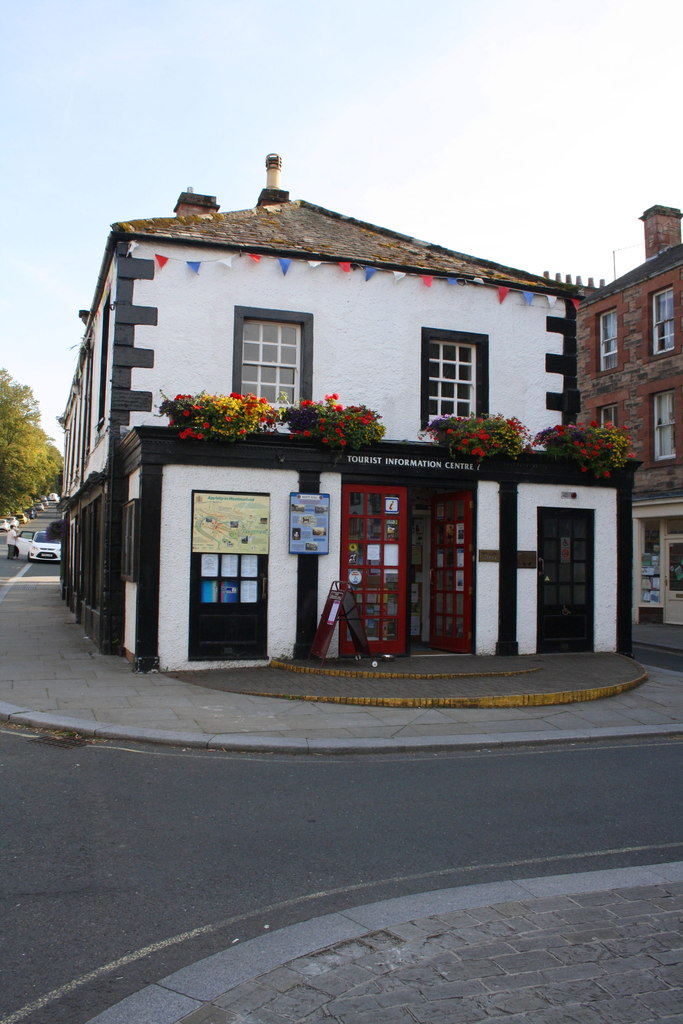
- Appleby-in-Westmorland Moot Hall

- Shown in Cumbria
- 54.5774°N 2.4911°W
- Location: Boroughgate, Appleby-in-Westmorland

History
- Built: 1596

Site notes
- Architectural style: Vernacular style

Listed Building – Grade II*
- Official name: Moot Hall
- Designated: 6 June 1951
- Reference no.: 1145607

The Moot Hall is a municipal building in Boroughgate, Appleby-in-Westmorland, Cumbria, England. The building, which is currently used as the meeting place of Appleby-in-Westmorland Town Council, is a Grade II* listed building.

== History ==
The building was designed in the vernacular style, built with a stucco finish and completed in 1596. The design involved a rectangular structure located in the middle row of Boroughgate with six bays on either side. The ends of the building were gabled and, at the south end, an external staircase was installed to provide access to the first floor, and a bellcote was installed on the roof. The building was fenestrated on the first floor by sash windows with architraves. Internally, the principal rooms were the council chamber and mayor's parlour on the first floor and a lower hall on the ground floor.

The county assize hearings, which had previously been held at Appleby Castle, were held in the moot hall from 1670 until 1778, when they moved to the new Shire Hall in The Sands. Appleby-in-Westmorland had a very small electorate and a dominant patron, William Lowther, 1st Earl of Lonsdale, which meant it was recognised by the UK Parliament as a rotten borough. Its right to elect members of parliament was removed by the Reform Act 1832, and its borough council, which had met in the council chamber, was reformed under the Municipal Corporations Act 1883.

During the second half of the 18th century, the lower hall was converted for retail use, and the stocks, which had been situated at the north end of the building, were removed to make way for the town weighing machine in 1835. In the late 19th century the building was extended to the north with the construction of an open-fronted shelter. As the responsibilities of the council grew, the town clerk's office re-located to The Cloisters at the north end of Boroughgate, although the town clerk's office moved back to the moot hall again in 1970, when the open-fronted shelter at the north end was enclosed.

The moot hall continued to serve as the meeting place of the municipal borough council for much of the 20th century, but ceased to be the local seat of government when the enlarged Eden District Council was formed in 1974. It subsequently became the meeting place of Appleby-in-Westmorland Town Council and annual mayor-making ceremonies continued to take place there. The interior of the building was remodelled at the north end in 1995, in order to create exhibition space and also to establish a home for the local tourist information office. By the early 21st century, the condition of the building had deteriorated and it was placed on the Heritage at Risk Register. An extensive programme of refurbishment works, financed by Historic England and Eden District Council, was completed in July 2022.

Works of art in the moot hall include a portrait by Godfried Schalcken of an unknown gentleman, thought to be King William III, as well as a portrait by an unknown artist of William Lowther, 1st Earl of Lonsdale.

== See also ==
- Grade II* listed buildings in Westmorland and Furness
- Listed buildings in Appleby-in-Westmorland
