= Eden FM =

Coordinates: 54.657386°N 2.761568°W

Penrith (Cumbria); England
- Broadcast area: Penrith, Appleby-in-Westmorland, Langwathby, Greystoke, Shap and villages
- Frequencies: 107.5 FM & Online

Programming
- Format: Community Radio

Ownership
- Owner: Eden FM Radio Ltd (Independent)

History
- First air date: November 2011 (Part Time); June 2014 (Full-time)

Links
- Website: www.edenfm.co.uk

Eden FM is a community radio station serving Penrith and the Eden Valley in Cumbria. The station is based in Newton Rigg, Newton Road, Penrith, Cumbria. The station founder was Lee Quinn, who was also the founder of Meridian FM Community Radio in East Grinstead, Sussex.

The campaign for a local station was launched in June 2010 by Lee Quinn, through launching a community magazine, the Eden Local, which was posted through doors in Penrith and the Eden Valley. The first Eden FM studios were switched on 10am Friday 25th November 2011.

Run by volunteers, the non-profit organisation, applied to Ofcom for a full-time community radio licence on an FM frequency in the community radio licensing: third round for the North East of England and Cumbria.

Currently broadcasting full-time online and on 107.5 FM, the station completed three 28-day restricted service licence broadcasts in November to December 2011, followed by a couple more in June to July 2012 and November to December 2012.

Eden FM submitted an application for a full-time licence in January 2013 and was awarded a 5-year licence in October of that year.

To celebrate the launch of the station full-time, Eden FM Radio Ltd, raised the funds to have a bespoke Penrith and Eden Valley Monopoly Board game produced, which reflected on the local towns and villages covered by Eden FM Radio include Penrith, Appleby-in-Westmorland, Langwathby, Greystoke, Shap, Skelton and Melmerby.

Eden FM Radio's community licence was renewed for a further five years in 2019 to 2024.

== See also ==
- List of radio stations in the United Kingdom
- Community radio
