= Colby, Cumbria =

Village and civil parish in England

Coordinates: 54.578°N 2.519°W

Colby
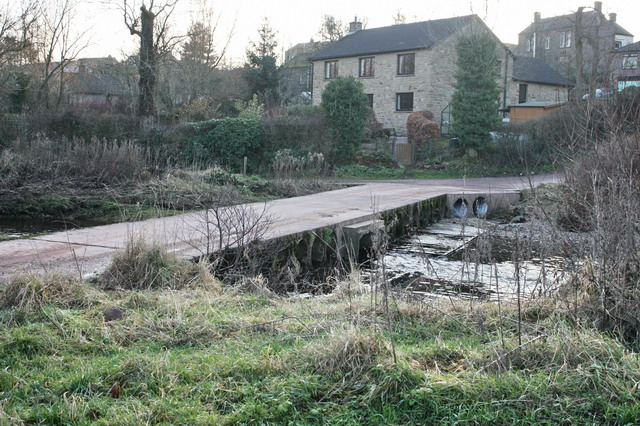
- The pipe bridge over Hoff Beck

- Location in Eden, Cumbria Location within Cumbria
- Population: 129 (2011)
- OS grid reference: NY6620
- Civil parish: Colby
- Unitary authority: Westmorland and Furness
- Ceremonial county: Cumbria
- Region: North West
- Country: England
- Sovereign state: United Kingdom
- Post town: APPLEBY IN WESTMORLAND
- Postcode district: CA16
- Dialling code: 01768
- Police: Cumbria
- Fire: Cumbria
- Ambulance: North West
- UK Parliament: Westmorland and Lonsdale

Colby is a village and civil parish in the Westmorland and Furness district of the English county of Cumbria. It is near the village of Bolton to the north and the town of Appleby-in-Westmorland to the east. At the 2001 census the parish had a population of 120, increasing to 129 at the 2011 Census.

== Transport ==
For transport there is the A66 road and the B6542 road (the old A66) nearby. Colby is next to the River Eden at its confluence with the Hoff Beck.

== See also ==
- Listed buildings in Colby, Cumbria
