= Listed buildings in Colby, Cumbria =

Colby is a civil parish in Westmorland and Furness, Cumbria, England. It contains three buildings that are recorded in the National Heritage List for England. Of these, one is listed at Grade II*, the middle of the three grades, and the others are at Grade II, the lowest grade. The parish contains the village of Colby and the surrounding countryside, and the listed buildings consist of farmhouses and farm buildings.

== Key ==
Grade	Criteria
II*	Particularly important buildings of more than special interest
II	Buildings of national importance and special interest

== Buildings ==
Name and location	Photograph	Date	Notes	Grade
Nether Hoff farmhouse 54.57449°N 2.51600°W		1683	A stone farmhouse, partly rendered, on a plinth, with quoins and a slate roof. There are two storeys with attics, four bays, and a stair outshut at the rear. The doorway has an architrave, and above it is a triangular initialled and dated panel. The windows on the front are mullioned, elsewhere some are mullioned, some have lost their mullions, and some are sashes. Inside the house are four pairs of upper cruck trusses.	II*
Farmhouse and barns, North end of Colby village 54.58226°N 2.52069°W		1785	The farmhouse, known as Colby House, and attached outbuildings are in stone with slate roofs. The house has two storeys and a symmetrical front of three bays. The central doorway has a rusticated surround and a dated lintel with false voussoirs. The windows on the front are sashes, and at the rear are mullioned windows and a staircase window with a semicircular head. Recessed and to the left of the house is a two-storey outbuilding with a door and a sash window. To the right and recessed is a long barn. In the ground floor are two doorways with segmental heads and one with a lintel, and five casement windows. In the upper floor are a loft door and ventilation slits. Further to the right is a lower two-storey extension. (Note: Street View in May 2009 shows that the outbuildings have been converted for residential use.)	II
Barn, byre and mill, Nether Hoff farm 54.57406°N 2.51578°W		Late 18th or early 19th century	A range of farm buildings with originally a mill at the southern end. The building is in stone with quoins and a slate roof, hipped at the ends. There are two storeys, with the former mill having three storeys. The barn contains multiple openings with segmental heads, and in front of it are animal pens. The wheel pit and mill-race of the mill have survived.	II

== Notes and references ==
=== Sources ===
- Historic England, "Nether Hoff farmhouse, Colby (1327000)", National Heritage List for England
- Historic England, "Farmhouse and attached barn on west side of road at north end of village, Colby (1137220)", National Heritage List for England
- Historic England, "Barn, byre and mill to south of Nether Hoff farmhouse, Colby (1213641)", National Heritage List for England
- Historic England, Listed Buildings
- Hyde, Matthew; Pevsner, Nikolaus (2010) [1967], Cumbria, The Buildings of England, New Haven and London: Yale University Press, ISBN 978-0-300-12663-1
