= Listed buildings in Appleby-in-Westmorland =

Appleby-in-Westmorland is a civil parish in Westmorland and Furness, Cumbria, England. It contains 144 buildings that are recorded in the National Heritage List for England. Of these, six are listed at Grade I, the highest of the three grades, eleven are at Grade II*, the middle grade, and the others are at Grade II, the lowest grade. The parish contains the market town of Appleby (renamed Appleby-in-Westmorland in 1974) and surrounding countryside. There is a great variety of types of listed building in the parish. The most important building is Appleby Castle; this and a number of associated structures are listed. Most of the listed buildings are houses and associated structures, shops and public buildings. Other listed buildings include churches, public houses, hotels, two crosses and a lamp post, farmhouses and farm buildings, former industrial buildings, schools, banks, a bridge, railway station buildings, a length of wall containing inscribed stones, a milestone, and three war memorials.

== Key ==
Grade	Criteria
I	Buildings of exceptional interest, sometimes considered to be internationally important
II*	Particularly important buildings of more than special interest
II	Buildings of national importance and special interest

== Buildings ==
Name and location	Photograph	Date	Notes	Grade
St Michael's Church; 54.57324°N 2.48316°W		11th century or before	The oldest part is the north door, the south arcade and transept were added in the 14th century, the church was restored in 1659 by Lady Anne Clifford, and again in 1885 when the tower was added. It is built in red sandstone and has slate roofs. The church consists of a nave, a south aisle, a south transept, a chancel, and a north tower. The tower is in Decorated style, with an embattled parapet, corner turrets and crocketed pinnacles. The north door is Saxon, and the south door is Norman. The church closed in 1875.	II*
Caesar's tower, Appleby Castle; 54.57361°N 2.48848°W		12th century	The keep is the oldest surviving building in the castle. It was altered in the 17th century by Lady Anne Clifford, and again in the following century. It consists of a square stone tower that has an embattled parapet with slits in the merlons. There is a turret on each corner surmounted by a lantern, and on the top of the tower are decorative weathervanes dated 1784. There is a round-headed entrance on the ground floor, and another similar entrance approached by an external staircase on the next floor.	I
St Lawrence's Church; 54.57818°N 2.49149°W		1150	The oldest part of the church is the lower part of the tower. The south porch dates from the 13th century, and the body of the church from the 14th and 15th centuries. It was restored in 1655 by Lady Anne Clifford, the ceilings were added in 1830–31, and there were further restorations in 1861–62 and in 1960. The church is built in stone with a lead roof, and consists of a nave with a clerestory, aisles, a chancel, a northeast chapel, a southwest porch, and a west tower. The tower and the clerestory are castellated. The base of the tower is Norman, and the rest of the exterior is in Perpendicular style.	I
Appleby Castle - main building 54.57354°N 2.48687°W		13th century	The oldest part of the building is the west part of the north wing with its round tower. The east range originated in the 15th century, and has since developed into a country house, mainly by the alterations carried out in the late 17th century. The house has an L-shaped plan, with towers at both ends of the east range. The courtyard face of the east range has two main storeys, a basement and attics, and six bays. Steps lead up to the doorway in the fourth bay, and this has an open curly pediment on brackets. The windows are mullioned, and contain sashes inserted in the 19th century. The later part of the north range was added in 1695, and is less decorated.	I
Wall incorporating the Bainbrigg Stones; 54.57770°N 2.49296°W		16th century	The wall is in red sandstone and is coped. It incorporates stones collected by the antiquarian Reginald Bainbrigg and incorporated into the wall in the late 19th century. Most of the stones are inscribed, some are original Roman stones, and others are replicas.	II
Moot Hall; 54.57733°N 2.49110°W		1596	The Moot Hall stands on an island site in Boroughgate; it is in stuccoed stone and has two storeys. The ground floor is occupied by small shops, the upper floor contains 18th-century windows, and inside is a panelled council chamber. At the south end are external steps leading to a first-floor doorway with a chamfered surround and a four-centred head carved with initials and the date. On the south gable is a bellcote, and at the north end is a single-storey extension.	II*
11 Boroughgate; 54.57752°N 2.49088°W		Late 16th to early 17th century	A shop in ashlar with a slate roof, in three storeys and with two gables. In the ground floor, to the right, is a doorway with a moulded surround, a stilted segmental head on scrolled imposts, and interlace decoration. To the left is the shop doorway flanked by 20th-century shop windows. In the middle floor are two modern windows, above which are hood moulds with scrolled ends. In the gables there are stepped three-light windows with round heads and moulded hood moulds. The gables have moulded copings and finials.	II
1, 2 and 3 The Sands; 54.57808°N 2.48939°W		1639	A row of two houses and a shop, roughcast over stone, and with two storeys. In the ground floor are three doors, two shop windows, and three house windows. In the upper floor are four windows.	II
3 and 4A Battlebarrow; 54.57995°N 2.49053°W	—	17th century	A stone house with two storeys and four bays. The second bay projects forward and forms a two-story gabled porch. In the ground floor the outer doorway has a semicircular head with imposts and interlace decoration, and above the doorway is a cornice. The windows date from the 18th or 19th century, and each has two lights with arched heads, splayed reveals and mullions.	II
36 Boroughgate; 54.57642°N 2.49073°W		Mid-17th century	Formerly the Black Bull Inn, it was altered in the 19th century. It is a stone house with a slate roof, and has three storeys. The doorway has a 17th-century surround. There are two windows in each floor, all dating from the 19th century, and there are also blocked 17th-century windows.	II*
Gateway to Appleby Castle, and Gatehouse and Castle Moat Cottages; 54.57369°N 2.48781°W		17th century (probable)	The gateway and cottages are in stone. The gateway has an arch and is battlemented. To the west are two cottages built into the curtain wall of the castle. Gatehouse Cottage has two long low storeys. Some of its windows are three-light casements with mullions, and the others are sashes. Further to the west is Castle Moat Cottage, with one storey and sash windows.	I
High Cross; 54.57545°N 2.48981°W		17th century	This consists of a Doric column with a strong entasis, standing on a square base, and with a cubical top. The top carries an inscription, and a weathervane was added in 1936.	II*
Lady Anne's Bee-house; 54.57468°N 2.48735°W		Mid-17th century	The structure was built by Lady Anne Clifford in the grounds of Appleby Castle. It is in stone, with a square plan, two storeys and a pyramidal roof. On one side is a doorway, and in the upper storeys of the other sides are windows with pointed head arches.	I
St Anne's Hospital and Chapel; 54.57603°N 2.48982°W		1651–53	This consists of cottages built as almshouses by Lady Anne Clifford, forming four sides of a cobbled courtyard, and incorporating a chapel. They are in sandstone with two storeys, and each cottage has a doorway and a two-light mullioned window in each floor. In the centre of the main front is a chamfered archway with a segmental head, above which is a panel with a coat of arms and an inscription. The chapel is in a corner and contains wall paintings.	II*
Former coach houses and stables, Castle Park; 54.57421°N 2.48899°W		1653	The coach houses and stables were built by Lady Anne Clifford, and have since been converted into residential accommodation. They are in red sandstone with hipped slate roofs, two storeys, and they form a quadrangular plan around a courtyard. In the northeast range is an arched entrance with a gable. The opposite range contains four coach houses with segmental arches, a central gateway, and stables.	I
11 Battlebarrow; 54.58040°N 2.49054°W	—	1662	A house at the end of a row in stuccoed stone, with two storeys and two bays. The doorway to the left has a four-centred arch, a flat head, and an initialled and dated lintel. The windows are sashes.	II
32 Boroughgate; 54.57662°N 2.49084°W		1677	A sandstone house with a slate roof, in two storeys and two bays. The windows are sashes, the doorway has a chamfered surround, and there is a yard door to the right.	II
2 High Wiend; 54.57689°N 2.49115°W		1677	A stuccoed building with traces of timber-framing inside, and a slate roof. There are two storeys and a central doorway. The windows are mullioned; there are two four-light window in each floor, and a two-light window above the door.	II
Howgate Foot, 4 The Sands; 54.57707°N 2.48726°W		1692	Originally the Queen's Head public house, later a private house, it is in stone with a slate roof. The windows are sashes, with three in the ground floor and two above.	II
11 Doomgate; 54.57603°N 2.49188°W	—	17th to 18th century	Originally a smithy, later a private house, it is in pebbledashed stone with a slate roof. There are two doors in the ground floor and two sash windows, and four sash windows above.	II
Crown and Cushion Hotel, 4 and 6 Low Wiend; 54.57771°N 2.49158°W		17th to 18th century	A public house in roughcast stone, with long and short quoins and a slate roof, in two storeys. In the ground floor is a square-headed doorway with a bolection-moulded architrave and three plain windows, and in the upper floor are four sash windows. At the rear is a three-storey wing facing Low Wiend, with three sash windows in stone architraves in each floor	II
30 Boroughgate (The Red House); 54.57673°N 2.49088°W		1717	A house in red sandstone ashlar that has a slate roof with stone copings. There are two storeys with a basement, and seven bays. Steps lead up to the central doorway that has a moulded architrave, a curved pediment, and an inscribed frieze. The windows are sashes, the window above the door having a moulded architrave. The basement is rusticated and contains four windows. Iron railings surround the basement area and flank the steps.	II*
2 Battlebarrow; 54.57987°N 2.49045°W	—	Early 18th century	A stone house in a row, with three storeys. In the ground floor is a plain doorway, a sash window, and a fire window. There is one sash window in each of the upper floors, that in the top floor being a horizontally-sliding sash.	II
Howgate Foot, 5 The Sands; 54.57714°N 2.48745°W	-	Early 18th century (probable)	A pebbledashed house with a slate roof, in two low storeys. The windows are casements, one in the ground floor and two above. To the right is a segmental-arched carriage entrance.	II
The Armoury and barn 54.57656°N 2.49281°W		Early 18th century	The house and barn are in red sandstone with slate roofs. The house has two storeys, a symmetrical front of three bays, and a gabled wing at the rear. The central doorway has a moulded surround and a rectangular fanlight. Most of the windows are sashes in hollow-chamfered architraves, and there are horizontally-sliding sashes in the left gable end and at the rear. The low barn is attached to the right, and has a small window.	II
The Clock House; 54.57769°N 2.49193°W		Early 18th century	A house in red sandstone that has a slate roof with stone copings and is in two storeys. In the ground floor, to the left is a segmental-arched carriage entry, and to the right are a moulded doorway, one modern window and two sash windows. In the upper floor are four sash windows, and above the door is a clock face.	II
1 Battlebarrow; 54.57980°N 2.49042°W	—	18th century	A stuccoed stone house with long and short quoins and a string course. There are two storeys and four bays. In the third bay is a doorway with a semicircular hood on brackets, and the windows are sashes.	II
4 Battlebarrow; 54.58004°N 2.49058°W	—	18th century	A stone house in a row, with two storeys and three bays. In the centre is a modern door, to the left is a wide segmental-arched entrance, and to the right is a former shop window. In the upper floor are three windows in splayed surrounds.	II
5–10 Battlebarrow; 54.58023°N 2.49071°W	—	18th century	A row of stone cottages in two storeys, all with sash windows in splayed surrounds. Nos. 8–10 have square-headed doorways with plain surrounds; No. 10 has three bays, and the other have two each. Nos. 5–7 are later, each has two bays, and the doorways have segmental heads.	II
5 and 7 Bongate; 54.57594°N 2.48373°W		18th century	A pair of stuccoed stone houses with two storeys. The doors are plain, No. 5 has a glazed porch, and the windows are sashes, with three on the ground floor, and four above.	II
13 Bongate; 54.57564°N 2.48345°W		18th century	A stuccoed stone house with a slate roof. It has two storeys and a symmetrical front of three bays. There is a central doorway, and the windows are sashes.	II
37 and 39 Bongate; 54.57390°N 2.48233°W		18th century	The building, now part of a public house, is in stuccoed stone with a slate roof, and has two storeys with attics. On the ground floor are three doorways with modern porches, and five windows. The upper floor has six windows, four of them shallow oriels and the others casements, and in the roof are three dormers. (Note: Street View in May 2009 shows that the building has been incorporated into the Royal Oak Hotel.)	II
3 and 5 Boroughgate; 54.57769°N 2.49103°W		18th century	A pair of stuccoed shops with a slate roof in two storeys. No. 3 has a curved angle and a convex gable, two doors and two shop windows in the ground floor, and two sash windows in the upper floor. No. 5 to the right has two doors, and one window in the ground floor and two windows above, all sashes.	II
7 and 9 Boroughgate; 54.57761°N 2.49096°W		18th century	A house and a shop in stuccoed stone with a slate roof, two storeys and sash windows. In the ground floor is a late Victorian shop front, with a doorway and a window to the left. There are four windows in the upper floor.	II
28 Boroughgate; 54.57683°N 2.49090°W		Mid-18th century	A stone shop with long and short quoins and a cornice. There are three storeys with a basement, and three bays. The central doorway has a chamfered surround and a round-arched hood on brackets. To the left is a bay window, and in the upper floors are sash windows in hollow-chamfered architraves.	II
37 and 39 Boroughgate; 54.57644°N 2.49005°W		18th century	A pair of stone houses with two storeys. No. 37 has long and short quoins to the left, windows with concrete architraves, and a curved stair window at the rear. No. 39 has a yard entrance to the left, a door with a fanlight, and sash windows. At the rear of both houses are wings used as separate accommodation.	II
41, 43 and 45 Boroughgate; 54.57631°N 2.48997°W		18th century	A row of three stone houses with stone-flag roofs, two storeys, and three doors. The windows are replacements in stone architraves, four on the ground floor and five above.	II
52 Boroughgate; 54.57582°N 2.49043°W		18th century	A stuccoed house in two storeys. There are two storeys and five bays. The doorway has a rectangular fanlight, and there is a smaller doorway to the left. The windows are sashes.	II
6 and 8 Bridge Street; 54.57793°N 2.49090°W		18th century	A pair of stuccoed stone shops with quoins and a slate roof. They both have two storeys, and two sash windows each in the upper floor. No. 6 is narrower with a low doorway and a small shop window in the ground floor. No. 8 has a 20th-century shop front with pilasters, a fascia, and a cornice.	II
10 Bridge Street; 54.57791°N 2.49111°W		18th century (probable)	A shop with two storeys. In the ground floor is a modern shop front. The upper floor is in red sandstone, and it contains two sash windows.	II
11 Bridge Street; 54.57777°N 2.49083°W		18th century	A roughcast shop with two low storeys. In the ground floor is a modern shop front, and a passage doorway to the left. In the upper floor are three sash windows.	II
5-7 Chapel Street; 54.57889°N 2.49363°W		18th century	A row of three houses at the end of a terrace, with two storeys and sash windows. Nos. 5 and 6 are pebbledashed with two windows in the ground floor, and three above. No. 7 is stuccoed with long and short quoins. It has a doorway to the left with a round head, imposts, a fanlight, and a moulded keystone. There are two windows in each floor.	II
8–11 Chapel Street; 54.57870°N 2.49346°W		18th century	A row of four houses at the end of a terrace, some are pebbledashed, and others are stuccoed, and they have two storeys. Between Nos. 9 and 10 is an arched carriage entrance, and No. 10 has a lean-to porch. The windows are sashes. At the rear is a round-arched stair window.	II
1 Doomgate and barn 54.57662°N 2.49218°W		18th century	The house is in pebbledashed stone with a slate roof, and has two storeys and two bays. In the ground floor is a doorway, a sash window, and a modern window, and in the upper floor are two sash windows. To the left and integral with the house, is a stone barn, with barred windows.	II
2, 3 and 4 Doomgate; 54.57642°N 2.49209°W		18th century	A row of three roughcast stone houses with a slate roof, in three storeys. To the right is a carriage entry with a segmental head, and above the doors are small fanlights. There are three sash windows in the ground floor, and four in each of the upper floors.	II
5 Doomgate; 54.57634°N 2.49206°W	—	18th century	A roughcast stone house is a terrace, with two storeys. The central doorway has projecting jambs and a triangular pediment-like hood mould. There are two sash windows in each floor with plain sandstone architraves.	II
13, 14 and 15 Doomgate; 54.57628°N 2.49171°W	—	18th century	A row of three red sandstone houses with a slate roof; Nos. 14 and 15 are pebbledashed. There are two storeys, and five sash windows in stone architraves, irregularly placed.	II
18 Doomgate and barn 54.57654°N 2.49185°W	—	18th century	The house is pebbledashed with two storeys and two bays. The door has a dentilled cornice and a fanlight, and to its right is a yard door. The windows are sashes in stone architraves. To the left of the house is a stone barn and stable, with quoins, a stone roof, wooden lintels, and ventilation slits.	II
12 and 14 High Wiend; 54.57679°N 2.49171°W	—	18th century	A pair of pebbledashed stone houses with a slate roof. There are two storeys, No. 12 has two doors, and there are five irregularly spaced sash windows in each floor.	II
1, 2 and 3 Mill Hill; 54.57289°N 2.48399°W		18th century	A row of stone cottages, whitewashed or pebbledashed with a slate roof, in two storeys. The doorways have plain surrounds, and the windows are casements with stone mullions, containing arched lights in rectangular architraves.	II
1 Scattergate; 54.57319°N 2.49059°W		18th century	Originally the Ship Inn and later a house, it is in stone with a slate roof, and has two storeys and a wing on the right to the rear. On the front is a central door and two sash windows in plain architraves in each floor. There is another door in the wing, and a sash window in each floor.	II
Barn to north of 1 Scattergate; 54.57334°N 2.49078°W		18th century (probable)	The barn is in stone, and has incorporated a re-used 17th-century door head that has a four-centred arch under a square head with voided spandrels. (Note: Street View in April 2010 shows that the barn has been converted for residential use.)	II
Outer Wall, Appleby Castle grounds 54.57171°N 2.48654°W		18th century	A continuous wall stretching from the South Lodge to the river, it is in sandstone and between 6 feet (1.8 m) and 8 feet (2.4 m) high. The wall contains some earlier material, and material from later repairs and rebuilding.	II
Outer Wall, Appleby Castle grounds 54.57494°N 2.49049°W		18th century	A wall stretching from the North Lodge to the South Lodge, it is in sandstone and between 6 feet (1.8 m) and 8 feet (2.4 m) high. The wall contains some earlier material, and material from later repairs and rebuilding.	II
Howgate Foot, 3 The Sands; 54.57709°N 2.48709°W		18th century (probable)	A stone house with a slate roof, in three storeys and three bays. It has a central doorway and sash windows.	II
Barn to rear of 34 Boroughgate; 54.57651°N 2.49113°W	—	18th century (probable)	The barn is in red sandstone and cobbles, and has a slate roof. It is a long barn on the north side of an enclosed inn yard.	II
Bongate Mill; 54.57258°N 2.48498°W		18th century	The former mill is in stuccoed stone with a hipped roof, and has three storeys. The windows are square, some with relieving arches. On the river front are three windows, a door, and a large sandstone arch for the wheel, which has been removed.	II
Barrowmoor and barn 54.57644°N 2.51286°W	—	18th century	A farmhouse and barn in stone with slate roofs. The house has two storeys, it has a central door in a gabled porch, and two three-light windows in each floor. The barn is attached to the left.	II
Friary Cottage and barn 54.58137°N 2.49089°W	—	18th century	The house and adjoining barn are in red sandstone. The house has two storeys and three bays. The barn projects forward, and contains a fragment of a 14th-century window, probably from the former Whitefriars' house. (Note: Street View in April 2010 shows that the barn has been converted for residential use.)	II
Barn to rear of Glen Hotel; 54.57659°N 2.49144°W	—	18th century (probable)	The barn is in red sandstone rubble and cobbles. It contains a segmental-arched carriage entrance.	II
The Grapes Hotel, 29–31 The Sands; 54.57929°N 2.48986°W		18th century	A public house and three houses, forming a row; they are all in stone and the windows are sashes. The public house has three storeys and five bays, and it contains a segmental-arched entry to the yard. No. 29 has three storeys and two bays. The other houses are stuccoed and have two storeys: No. 30 has three bays and a doorway with a fanlight and a cornice, and No. 31 has two bays.	II
Hare and Hounds public house 54.57747°N 2.49083°W		18th century	The public house is in stuccoed stone and has three storeys. In the ground floor is a 19th-century shop front with colonnets and foliated capitals containing sash windows. To the right is a rusticated segmental-headed archway. There are two sash windows in each of the upper floors.	II
Low Cross; 54.57774°N 2.49132°W		18th century	A copy of the High Cross, it consists of a Doric column with a strong entasis, standing on a square base, and with a cubical top.	II*
Mill House; 54.57257°N 2.48457°W	—	18th century	A stone house in two storeys, it has a doorway with a cornice on imposts. The windows are sashes in moulded architraves, with three on the ground floor and four above.	II
Old Hall, Bongate; 54.57253°N 2.48007°W	—	18th century	The house is roughcast over stone, and has a slate roof with stone copings. There are two storeys, four bays, and a lower extension to the right. The doorway has a chamfered surround, a modern door, and a trellis porch, and the windows are sashes in moulded surrounds.	II
The Old Hall, Doomgate; 54.57643°N 2.49178°W	—	18th century	A stuccoed stone house with a slate roof, two storeys and three bays. Above the central door is a fanlight, and the windows are sashes.	II
Rose Cottage; 54.57283°N 2.48086°W	—	18th century	A stuccoed stone house with a slate roof. It has two storeys, four bays, and sash windows in plain stone architraves.	II
Former White Hart and Stable to the Rear, 34 Boroughgate; 54.57652°N 2.49076°W		Mid-18th century	The former hotel, which probably contains earlier material, is in sandstone, rendered and painted, with quoins and a Westmorland slate roof. There are three storeys and a front of three bays, with a square-headed main entrance, sash windows, a yard entrance, and a pub sign. At the rear is a two-storey lean-to stair turret, another lean-to, and a two-storey former stable and coach house.	II
The White House; 54.57699°N 2.49046°W		1764–65	A stuccoed stone house with long and short quoins, three string courses, and a hipped roof. There are three storeys, and three bays on each front. The windows have moulded architraves and ogee heads, and the doorway on the right side also has an ogee head. At the rear is a two-storey brick wing and a cottage.	II*
Police Station; 54.57798°N 2.48867°W		1770	Originally the county gaol, it was converted into a police station in 1971. The building is in stone, with long and short quoins, a string course, and a hipped roof. There are two storeys and a symmetrical front of three storeys, the central doorway having a rectangular fanlight. The main block is flanked by projecting single-storey wings each with a segmental-arched passageway. In front of the main block is a flagged terrace and a forecourt wall with a central gate.	II
16 Boroughgate; 54.57725°N 2.49131°W	—	1772	The building is in red sandstone with quoins, three storeys and three bays. The central bay projects forward under a gable and has Doric columns forming a porch. Each of the outer bays contains a shop. In the upper floors are sash windows in plain architraves.	II
3 Bongate; 54.57610°N 2.48393°W		Late 18th century	A detached stuccoed house with a slate roof in two storeys. The doorway has a plain surround with imposts and a semicircular blind fanlight. Flanking the doorway are 20th-century bay windows, with a verandah running above the door and the windows. In the upper floor are two sash windows in plain architraves.	II
6 Bongate and barn 54.57573°N 2.48405°W		Late 18th century	Originally the Red Lion public house, later a private house, it is roughcast over stone and has a slate roof. There are two storeys and two bays, a modern door, and sash windows. To the right is a farm building in red sandstone that has a blocked cart entrance with a segmental arch, doorways, windows and ventilation slits.	II
23 and 25 Boroughgate; 54.57709°N 2.49052°W		Late 18th century	A shop in red ashlar sandstone with quoins, three storeys, and four bays. In the ground floor is a 19th-century shop front with iron colonettes that have foliated capitals, an embattled cornice above the door, panelled pilasters, and a dentilled cornice. To the left is a lower semi-basement window, and to the right is a rusticated segmental-headed archway. In the upper storeys are sash windows.	II
40 Boroughgate; 54.57632°N 2.49067°W		Late 18th century	A house in ashlar stone with a slate roof, in two storeys and five bays. There are two doorways, one in the centre and one on the left, and the windows are sashes in plain stone architraves.	II
50 Boroughgate; 54.57594°N 2.49048°W		Late 18th century	A stuccoed stone house with long and short quoins, an eaves cornice, and a slate roof with stone copings. There are two storeys and three bays. In the right bay is a doorway with a fanlight, and to the left is a narrow yard door. The windows are sashes.	II
60 and 62 Boroughgate; 54.57546°N 2.49020°W		Late 18th century	A pair of houses set at right angles to the road. They are in roughcast over stone and have two storeys and attics. The windows have stone architraves. On the gable end facing the road are a sash window in the ground floor, two in the upper floor, and one in the gable.	II
16–19 Chapel Street; 54.57829°N 2.49313°W		Late 18th century	A row of four stuccoed stone houses with long and short quoins at the ends, and a slate roof. There are two storeys, and each house has two bays. In the centre is a segmental-arched carriage entrance with rusticated voussoirs. The windows are sashes.	II
20–26 Chapel Street; 54.57805°N 2.49298°W		Late 18th century	A terrace of seven roughcast stone houses with a slate roof, in two storeys. Each house has a door with a small fanlight, and a sash window in each floor. Between Nos. 24 and 25 is a segmental-arched carriage entrance.	II
27, 28 and 29 Chapel Street; 54.57783°N 2.49283°W		Late 18th century	A row of three pebbledashed stone houses in a terrace, taller than their neighbours. They have long and short quoins, a string course, and an eaves cornice. There are three modern doors, and three sash windows on each floor.	II
30, 31 and 32 Chapel Street; 54.57769°N 2.49274°W		Late 18th century	A row of three stone houses at the end of a terrace with a slate roof, in two storeys. The doorways and the sash windows have chamfered sandstone surrounds. Nos. 30 and 31 have one window in each floor. No. 32 is pebbledashed, and has three bays.	II
[Former] A'board Inn; 54.57687°N 2.49034°W		Late 18th century	A former public house in red sandstone ashlar, with three storeys and two bays. There is a central doorway and two windows in each floor.	II
Church View; 54.57354°N 2.48190°W		Late 18th century	A sandstone house with a slate roof, in two storeys and four bays. On the front is a modern timber porch, and the windows are sashes in plain architraves.	II
Gardener's Cottage; 54.57230°N 2.48974°W		Late 18th century (probable)	A sandstone house with a slate roof in two storeys. There is a central doorway, and two sash windows in plain stone architraves in each floor,	II
Westmorland House; 54.57763°N 2.49152°W		Late 18th century	A shop that was altered in the mid-19th century. It is in stuccoed stone, and has three storeys and three bays. The windows in the middle storey have round heads and keystones, and those in the top floor have flat heads. In the ground floor there is a Victorian shop front, with twisted columns on fluted bases with foliated Composite capitals, and round arches with cusped roundels in the typmana. Over the whole is a cornice.	II
Garden wall, gateway and summer house, White House; 54.57706°N 2.48999°W	—	Late 18th century	The wall is at the back of the garden, it is about 10 feet (3.0 m) high, and contains a plain gateway. The wall connects the east wing of the house to a small octagonal brick summer house.	II
Stable and coach house, White House; 54.57700°N 2.49008°W		Late 18th century	The stable and coach house are in brick. They contain a segmental-arched entrance, and a window with an ogee-shaped head.	II
White Rails; 54.57669°N 2.49018°W		Late 18th century	A house in red sandstone ashlar on a moulded plinth and with a moulded cornice. There are two storeys, four bays, and a projecting single-bay wing to the right with a hipped roof. The doorway has a square head and a rectangular fanlight, and the windows are sashes.	II
Shire Hall; 54.57788°N 2.48834°W		1776–78	Originally the Assize and County Court, with prison facilities added at the rear in the 19th century. The original part is roughcast with sandstone dressings, the extensions are in sandstone, and the roofs are hipped with Westmorland slate. Overall it has a U-shaped plan. There are seven steps along the front facing the road, which has two storeys and eight bays. In the first four and the eighth bays are doors with fanlights, between are three windows, and there are eight windows in the upper floor, all in ashlar surrounds.	II
Rhondda House; 54.57203°N 2.48856°W		1779 (probable)	Originally two cottages, later combined into one house. It is in stone with a slate roof, and has two long storeys with a modern glazed door. The windows are sashes, three in each floor, all in plain stone architraves.	II
Castle Bank House; 54.57150°N 2.48649°W		1792	A red sandstone house with long and short quoins, an eaves cornice, and two storeys. The doorway has a moulded architrave and a pediment, and to the left is a two-storey five-sided bay window. To the right of the main block and set back is a two-storey two-bay extension.	II
49–55 Boroughgate; 54.57555°N 2.48948°W		Late 18th to early 19th century	A row of four houses in red sandstone ashlar with two storeys. No. 49 has two bays, and the others have three each. The doors have plain surrounds and fanlights, and No. 51 also has a pediment, dentils and pilasters. The windows are sashes in plain surrounds.	II
Bank Barn, Barrowmoor; 54.57613°N 2.51286°W	—	Late 18th to early 19th century (probable)	A stone barn with a slate roof, in two storeys with stables below and the barn above. It is in rubble with ashlar surrounds to the openings. It contains a large cart entrance, and square ventilation holes.	II
Bongate House; 54.57618°N 2.48455°W		18th to 19th century	A stuccoed stone house with two storeys and three bays. The central bay contains a round-headed doorway with a fanlight, and a sash window in the upper floor. Each of the outer bays contains a two-storey three-sided bay window with a hipped roof.	II
Golden Ball Hotel; 54.57687°N 2.49131°W		Late 18th to early 19th century	A roughcast public house with three storeys and three bays. The doorway has a semicircular hood, and to the left are two segmental-headed arches of differing sizes. The windows are sashes.	II
Old Brewery; 54.57609°N 2.49163°W		Late 18th to early 19th century	The building, formerly listed as "Hall's Warehouse", is in red sandstone, the left gable end being pebbledashed, and it has three storeys. It contains two segmental arches on the ground floor, and windows of varying types above, some of which were formerly warehouse doors. In the left end are three sash windows in each floor. (Note: Street View in May 2009 shows that the warehouse has been converted for residential use.)	II
Mallard House and Tarka; 54.57254°N 2.49573°W	—	Late 18th to early 19th century	Originally a row of three cottages, later converted into two houses. They are roughcast with a slate roof, and have two storeys and four bays, and sash windows in plain stone architraves. In the ground floor is a door and five windows, and there are four windows in the upper floor.	II
Barley Cottage and The Shieling; 54.57560°N 2.49166°W		Late 18th to early 19th century	The building, formerly listed as "Old Brewery", is in stone with a slate roof and has a long rectangular plan. There are two storeys, with two segmental arches and six windows in the ground floor and eight windows in the upper floor. At the right is a lean-to extension. (Note: Street View in May 2009 shows that the building has been converted into residential accommodation.)	II
Parkinhill Farmhouse and barn 54.56885°N 2.49128°W	—	Late 18th to early 19th century	The farmhouse and barn are in stone with a slate roof. The house is roughcast with two storeys and five bays. The central doorway has a fanlight and a lintel. To the left of the doorway are two French windows, the other windows are casements, with two lights and Gothic heads, and stone sills and lintels. The barn to the left has two tiers of ventilation slits.	II
The Terrace; 54.57338°N 2.48065°W	—	18th to 19th century	A detached house in stuccoed and colour-washed stone, with quoins, an eaves cornice, a parapet, and a hipped slate roof. There are two storeys and three bays. The central doorway has a moulded architrave and a cornice, and there is a lean-to glazed verandah along the front. The windows are sashes, and at the rear is a round-headed stair window.	II
Beech Croft; 54.57538°N 2.48267°W	—	1809	A stuccoed house in cottage orné style. It has two storeys, single-storey wings at the sides, and a conservatory at the rear. On the front is a three-sided castellated porch and a Gothic doorway with a four-centred arch. The windows have hollow-chamfered stone mullions and transoms and contain round-headed lights.	II
The Cloisters; 54.57786°N 2.49144°W		1811	A stone screen by Robert Smirke, consisting of an arcade of seven pointed arches with a tower at each end. The centre three arches are open, and at the top is a battlemented parapet with a coat of arms in the centre in a quatrefoil panel. The towers are square, each with two storeys, corbelled parapets, a square-headed door and windows in the lower storey, and lancet windows with hood mould above.	II*
11 Bongate; 54.57570°N 2.48355°W		Early 19th century	A pebbledashed stone house in a row with a slate roof. There are two storeys, a symmetrical front of three bays, and sash windows.	II
42 and 44 Boroughgate; 54.57615°N 2.49063°W		Early 19th century	A pair of stuccoed houses with two storeys on a sloping site. Between the houses is a segmental arched passage, and this is flanked by round-headed doorways. Above the archway is a three-light window, and there are two windows in each floor of each house. The house to the right has a basement with two storeys.	II
46 and 48 Boroughgate; 54.57604°N 2.49051°W		Early 19th century	A pair of stone houses that have a slate roof with stone copings. There are three storeys, No. 46 has two bays, and No. 48 has three. The doorways have plain surrounds, and the windows are sashes in plain stone architraves.	II
1 and 3 Bridge Street; 54.57794°N 2.49032°W		Early 19th century	No. 1 is a red sandstone shop, with two storeys, three bays, and sash windows in the upper floor. No. 3 is the King's Head public house. The main part is stuccoed, with three storeys and five bays, quoins, two string courses, and an eaves cornice. The central doorway has a moulded architrave and a cornice, and the windows are sashes. To the left is a lower two-storey section that includes a wide-arched carriage entry.	II
4 Bridge Street; 54.57798°N 2.49076°W		Early 19th century	A shop in ashlar with three storeys and three bays, In the ground floor is a double-fronted shop window, above which is a dentilled cornice. In the upper floors are sash windows in plain stone architraves.	II
5 and 7 Bridge Street; 54.57782°N 2.49069°W		Early 19th century	A pair of shops in ashlar, with long and short quoins, string courses, and an eaves cornice. There are three storeys and each shop has two bays. Between the shop fronts is a passage entrance with a traceried rectangular fanlight. The shop window to No. 5 has thin colonnets, panelled pilasters, fascia and a cornice. In the upper floors are sash windows.	II
33 Chapel Street; 54.57745°N 2.49262°W		Early 19th century	An office building in Classical style, it is in sandstone on a plinth, rendered on the side and rear, with quoins, sill bands, a moulded eaves cornice, and a Westmorland slate roof. There are two storeys and a partial basement, and three bays. The central doorway has engaged Tuscan columns, a semicircular fanlight and an open pediment. The windows are sashes, and at the rear is a round-headed window with Y-tracery. Much of the interior has been unaltered.	II*
6–9 Doomgate; 54.57619°N 2.49196°W	—	Early 19th century	A row of four red sandstone houses in a terrace with a slate roof, in two storeys. Above the doors are fanlights, there are five sash windows in the ground floor and six above.	II
16–18 High Wiend; 54.57682°N 2.49208°W		Early 19th century	A row of three stuccoed stone buildings in two storeys. No 16. has two bays, a doorway and a yard entrance in the ground floor and sash windows above, No. 17 has three bays, a shop front in the ground floor, and sash windows above, and No. 18 has a symmetrical three-bay front, a central door with a fanlight, and sash windows.	II
Bank House; 54.57655°N 2.49014°W		Early 19th century	Also known as the Masonic Hall, it is in roughcast stone with quoins, bands, and a cornice. There are three storeys with cellars, and a symmetrical front of five bays. Steps lead up to a central doorway with a segmental arch and a rusticated surround. The windows are sashes.	II
Barbadoes Lodge; 54.57253°N 2.49375°W		Early 19th century	A detached stuccoed house with a slate roof, two storeys, a symmetrical three-bay front, and a recessed wing on the right. There is a central doorway and the windows are sashes in plain stone architraves.	II
Courtfield Hotel; 54.57251°N 2.48268°W		Early 19th century	Originally St Michael's Vicarage, the building is roughcast over stone, with quoins, a band, a parapet, and a hipped slate roof. There are two storeys and three bays. On the front is a central Doric porch, and the windows are sashes in plain stone architraves.	II
The Friary; 54.58118°N 2.49017°W	—	Early 19th century	A detached stuccoed house, with two storeys and an entrance front of three bays. It has a central single-storey Tuscan portico with a full entablature on two pairs of coupled Ionic columns. The windows are sashes.	II
Gates, gate piers and railings, The Friary; 54.58107°N 2.49087°W	—	Early 19th century	There are two pairs of square gate piers, one pair flanking the gates, the others at the ends of the walls, They are in rusticated stone with cornices and ball finials, and the gates are in iron. The low walls are curved, and they carry cast iron railings.	II
Kirkstone House with farm buildings 54.58188°N 2.49177°W	—	Early 19th century	The farmhouse and farm buildings are in red sandstone. The house has quoins on the left, a moulded stone cornice, two storeys, and three bays. There is a central doorway, and the windows are sashes in plain surrounds. The farm buildings to the right have external stone steps leading to a first floor doorway. (Note: Street View in April 2010 shows that the farm buildings have been converted for residential use.)	II
Milestone, Bongate; 54.57580°N 2.48378°W		Early 19th century	The milestone is in metal, and has a triangular plan with a half-pyramidal top. Its raised lettering indicates the distances in miles to Brough and to Penrith.	II
Eden Bridge Shop and Café (now Riverside Café); 54.57829°N 2.48954°W		1830	The shop and attached café are in roughcast stone, and have two storeys. In the ground floor are three shop windows with cornices, and in the upper floor are four windows, two modern and two sashes.	II
33A Chapel Street; 54.57738°N 2.49259°W		Early to mid-19th century	A house in rendered red sandstone with quoins and a hipped Westmorland slate roof. There are three storeys and two bays. In the ground floor is a doorway and a sash window to the right set in a blocked arched carriage entrance. The windows in the upper floors are sashes.	II
New House; 54.56977°N 2.49000°W	—	Early to mid-19th century	A square house on a stone plinth, roughcast, with quoins, a band, overhanging eaves, and a hipped slate roof. There are two storeys, a symmetrical front of three bays, and a recessed wing on the left. The central door has a traceried fanlight in a sandstone architrave. The windows in the main part of the house are casements in stone architraves, and in the wing they are sashes. On the left side is a canted bay window.	II
Former British School; 54.57856°N 2.49308°W	—	1849	The former schoolmaster's house is roughcast over stone, with quoins and a slate roof. It has two storeys, a gable end facing the road, two sash windows in each floor, and a doorway on the left side. The school, later used by a builders' merchant, has a single storey, a round-arched doorway and two Gothic windows.	II
15 and 17 Boroughgate; 54.57738°N 2.49071°W		Mid-19th century	A pair of shops in stone that have a slate roof with stone copings. There are two stories, and each shop has two bays. In the ground floor are two early 20th-century shop fronts, between which is a doorway with a fanlight and panelled pilasters. In the upper floor are four sash windows.	II
54 Boroughgate; 54.57565°N 2.49030°W		Mid-19th century	A house in ashlar sandstone in late Georgian style. It has two storeys and four bays. There are two doorways with fanlights, the doorway to the right also having an ogee-arched porch. The windows are sashes.	II
56 and 58 Boroughgate; 54.57557°N 2.49024°W		Mid-19th century	A pair of stone houses, with long and short quoins and a stone-slate roof. There are two storeys, and each house has two bays. The windows are sashes.	II
9 Bridge Street; 54.57783°N 2.49076°W		Mid-19th century	A building in ashlar with quoins, bands, and a rusticated ground floor. There are three storeys and two bays. In the ground floor are two large round-arched windows with decorative tracery, and above the windows are sashes.	II
1 High Wiend; 54.57682°N 2.49096°W	—	Mid-19th century	A red sandstone shop, with long and short quoins, in four storeys. In the ground floor are two doorways and two small shop windows, and in the upper floors are sash windows, irregularly placed.	II
30 Boroughgate; 54.57679°N 2.49030°W		1851	A stone building in Gothic style with a slate roof. There are two storeys and three bays. In the left bay is a carriage entrance with a four-centred arch, the central bay projects forward and is gabled. The windows are casements with pointed heads and hood moulds. The gable and the eaves have scalloped bargeboards.	II
Footbridge, Appleby Station; 54.58054°N 2.48676°W		Mid-to late 19th century	The footbridge was moved here from Mansfield station in 1901. It is carried on fluted cast iron columns with acanthus capitals. The footbridge is in wrought iron and consists of a latticed segmental arch.	II
(Former) Midland Bank; 54.57719°N 2.49051°W		Mid-to late 19th century	The bank is in ashlar and has three storeys. In the ground floor is a segmental arch leading to the rear yard, and to the left are two round-arched windows. The middle floor contains four windows with segmental heads and balconies, and in the top floor are four sash windows. At the top is an embattled parapet on brackets.	II
Entrance gates, piers and wall, Appleby Castle; 54.57514°N 2.48962°W		Mid-to late 19th century	The gates are at the entrance to the castle grounds from Boroughgate. There are four square stone piers with cornices, the inner ones surmounted by iron lamps. The gates are in cast iron. From the piers, a sandstone wall extends on both sides to smaller terminal piers.	II
North Lodge, Appleby Castle; 54.57510°N 2.48976°W		Mid-to late 19th century	The lodge is at the entrance to the castle grounds from Boroughgate. It is in red sandstone with two storeys, a cornice between the storeys, and an embattled parapet. The windows are cross windows with moulded mullions and transoms. At the rear is a stepped gable.	II
Tufton Arms Hotel and 12 Boroughgate; 54.57752°N 2.49141°W		1873	The hotel and shop are in polychrome stone and have three storeys. The hotel has four bays, the outer bays being gabled, and the inner bays having gabled dormers. In the ground floor, the left bay has a segmental-arched yard entry, and in front of the middle two bays is a verandah and porch. In the middle floor of the right bay is a large oriel window on a buttress, and the other windows are sashes. At the rear is a range of former stables in sandstone with brick dressings. The shop, to the left, has one bay, a shop front on the ground floor and sash windows above.	II
14 Boroughgate; 54.57736°N 2.49133°W		Late 19th century	A shop in red sandstone with three storeys, quoins, and an early 20th-century shop front. There are three sash windows in each of the upper floors, with long and short quoins to the architraves.	II
Lamp post to north of High Cross; 54.57548°N 2.48984°W		Late 19th century	The lamp post is in iron, and has volutes at the base and a fluted stem. At the top are spandrels and two arms holding lanterns.	II*
Appleby Station, Main Building; 54.58031°N 2.48658°W		1876	The station was built by the Midland Railway for the Settle-Carlisle Line. The main building is in brick with sandstone dressings and a Welsh slate roof. It is in a single storey with five bays and a cross-wing at the north. The outer and middle bays are gabled with trefoils, and in the centre is a doorway with double doors and cast iron lozenge glazing. The gables have fretted bargeboards, and all the windows are sashes.	II
Appleby Station, East Platform Building; 54.58045°N 2.48639°W		1876	The station was built by the Midland Railway for the Settle-Carlisle Line. The building on the east platform is in brick with sandstone dressings and a Welsh slate roof. It is in a single storey and has a single-depth plan. In the platform face are four pairs of sash windows and a plain doorway, and the end gables have fretted bargeboards.	II
(Former) Barclays Bank; 54.57726°N 2.49067°W		1876	The bank, originally the Carlisle and Cumberland Bank, is in Victorian Gothic style. It is built in pink rubble stone with buff ashlar dressings, and has three storeys. The windows in the ground and middle floors have pointed arches with granite columns and stiff leaf capitals, and those in the top floor have triangular heads. On the middle floor are cast iron balconies, and at the top of the building is a balustraded parapet, and dormer windows in the roof. The left bay is curved, it contains a doorway, and joins the adjacent building.	II
Appleby Grammar School, Main building 54.58330°N 2.49466°W		1886–87	The school is in red and grey stone, and has a slate roof with red tile cresting. The main block has two storeys and six bays with mullioned and transomed windows. Projecting to the left is the former schoolmaster's house, with mullioned sash windows, and to the right is the chapel with a four-light Perpendicular window. Incorporated in the porch is the doorway from a former school dated 1671.	II
St. Lawrence's Bridge; 54.57812°N 2.48983°W		1889	The bridge carries Bridge Street, the B6260 road, over the River Eden. It is in Georgian style, in red and grey stone, and consists of two segmental arches with three-sided cutwaters. In the spandrels are Gothic quatrefoiled circles.	II
Boer War Memorial; 54.57334°N 2.48235°W		1902	The war memorial stands in the centre of a road junction. It is in sandstone, and consists of an obelisk with a tapered shaft carrying a cross-head representing the badge of the Border Regiment. The shaft stands on a plinth with decorated pediments, on three-stepped base surrounded by railings. The plinth has an inscription, the name of the one man lost, and the names of all the volunteers who served in the Boer War.	II
War memorial 54.57799°N 2.49145°W		1921	The war memorial is in the churchyard of St Lawrence's Church. It is in stone, and consists of a wheel-head cross richly carved with interlace patterns on the head and the shaft. The shaft is tapering and stands on a tapering square plinth on a two-stepped base. On the plinth is an inscription and the names of those lost in the First World War.	II
War memorial obelisk 54.57510°N 2.47922°W	—	1921	The memorial stands in the centre of Appleby Cemetery. It is in limestone, and consists of an obelisk with a square plan on a tall plinth. The plinth has a chamfered square base and is on four square steps. The plinth has a moulded cap with wreathes in round-headed pediments, and an inscription relating to the First World War. On the base are the dates of the Second World War and the names of those lost.	II
31, 33 and 35 Bongate; 54.57407°N 2.48226°W		Undated	A row of three houses in roughcast stone, with a slate roof, and in two storeys. Two of the houses have one door each and one sash window in each floor; the other house has two doors and two sash windows in each floor.	II

== Notes and references ==
=== Sources ===
- Historic England, "Church of St. Michael, Appleby-in-Westmorland (1137750)", National Heritage List for England
- Historic England, "Caesar's tower at Appleby Castle, Appleby-in-Westmorland (1145604)", National Heritage List for England
- Historic England, "Parish Church of St. Lawrence, Appleby-in-Westmorland (1312067)", National Heritage List for England
- Historic England, "Main Building of Appleby Castle, Appleby-in-Westmorland (1137815)", National Heritage List for England
- Historic England, "Length of wall incorporating the Bainbrigg Stones, Appleby-in-Westmorland (1471164)", National Heritage List for England
- Historic England, "Moot Hall, Appleby-in-Westmorland (1145607)", National Heritage List for England
- Historic England, "No. 11 Boroughgate, Appleby-in-Westmorland (1145609)", National Heritage List for England
- Historic England, "No. 2 High Wiend, Appleby-in-Westmorland (1311602)", National Heritage List for England
- Historic England, "Howgate Foot, No. 4 The Sands, Appleby-in-Westmorland (1311519)", National Heritage List for England
- Historic England, "No. 11 Doomgate, Appleby-in-Westmorland (1220837)", National Heritage List for England
- Historic England, "Crown and Cushion Hotel, Nos.4 and 6 Low Wiend, Appleby-in-Westmorland (1319034)", National Heritage List for England
- Historic England, "Nos. 1, 2 and 3 The Sands, Appleby-in-Westmorland (1158381)", National Heritage List for England
- Historic England, "Nos. 3 and 4A Battlebarrow, Appleby-in-Westmorland (1319042)", National Heritage List for England
- Historic England, "No. 36 Boroughgate, Appleby-in-Westmorland (1145578)", National Heritage List for England
- Historic England, "Gateway to Appleby Castle courtyard, Gatehouse Cottage, Castle Moat Cottage, Appleby-in-Westmorland (1145605)", National Heritage List for England
- Historic England, "High Cross, Appleby-in-Westmorland (1311978)", National Heritage List for England
- Historic England, "Lady Anne's Bee-house, in copse to north-east of former stable block at Appleby Castle, Appleby-in-Westmorland (1319047)", National Heritage List for England
- Historic England, "St Anne's Hospital and Chapel, Appleby-in-Westmorland (1145571)", National Heritage List for England
- Historic England, "Nos. 1 and 2 Castle Park; The Flat, Castle Park; Former coach-houses and stables, Castle Park, Appleby-in-Westmorland (1137851)", National Heritage List for England
- Historic England, "No. 30 Boroughgate, Appleby-in-Westmorland (1146473)", National Heritage List for England
- Historic England, "No. 2 Battlebarrow, Appleby-in-Westmorland (1145591)", National Heritage List for England
- Historic England, "No. 11 Battlebarrow, Appleby-in-Westmorland (1145593)", National Heritage List for England
- Historic England, "Howgate Foot, No. 5 The Sands, Appleby-in-Westmorland (1145560)", National Heritage List for England
- Historic England, "The Armoury. Barn attached to the Armoury, Appleby-in-Westmorland (1158306)", National Heritage List for England
- Historic England, "The Clock House, Appleby-in-Westmorland (1145553)", National Heritage List for England
- Historic England, "No. 1 Battlebarrow, Appleby-in-Westmorland (1319041)", National Heritage List for England
- Historic England, "No. 4 Battlebarrow, Appleby-in-Westmorland (1145592)", National Heritage List for England
- Historic England, "Nos. 5 to 10 Battlebarrow, Appleby-in-Westmorland (1319043)", National Heritage List for England
- Historic England, "Nos. 5 and 7 Bongate, Appleby-in-Westmorland (1137668)", National Heritage List for England
- Historic England, "No. 13 Bongate, Appleby-in-Westmorland (1319046)", National Heritage List for England
- Historic England, "Nos. 37 and 39 Bongate, Appleby-in-Westmorland (1145599)", National Heritage List for England
- Historic England, "Nos. 3 and 5 Boroughgate, Appleby-in-Westmorland (1319049)", National Heritage List for England
- Historic England, "Nos. 7 and 9 Boroughgate, Appleby-in-Westmorland (1311990)", National Heritage List for England
- Historic England, "No. 28 Boroughgate, Appleby-in-Westmorland (1319036)", National Heritage List for England
- Historic England, "Nos. 37, 37A, 39 and 39A Boroughgate, Appleby-in-Westmorland (1145570)", National Heritage List for England
- Historic England, "Nos. 41, 43 and 45 Boroughgate, Appleby-in-Westmorland (1319033)", National Heritage List for England
- Historic England, "No. 52 Boroughgate, Appleby-in-Westmorland (1145581)", National Heritage List for England
- Historic England, "Nos. 6 and 8 Bridge Street, Appleby-in-Westmorland (1319038)", National Heritage List for England
- Historic England, "No. 10 Bridge Street, Appleby-in-Westmorland (1145585)", National Heritage List for England
- Historic England, "No. 11 Bridge Street, Appleby-in-Westmorland (1145584)", National Heritage List for England
- Historic England, "Nos. 5 to 7 Chapel Street, Appleby-in-Westmorland (1311705)", National Heritage List for England
- Historic England, "Nos. 8 to 11 Chapel Street, Appleby-in-Westmorland (1145586)", National Heritage List for England
- Historic England, "Integral barn adjoining No. 1 Doomgate, Appleby-in-Westmorland (1145546)", National Heritage List for England
- Historic England, "Nos. 2, 3 and 4 Doomgate, Appleby-in-Westmorland (1145547)", National Heritage List for England
- Historic England, "No. 5 Doomgate, Appleby-in-Westmorland (1319061)", National Heritage List for England
- Historic England, "Nos. 13, 14 and 15 Doomgate, Appleby-in-Westmorland (1319063)", National Heritage List for England
- Historic England, "No. 18 Doomgate with barn adjoining, Appleby-in-Westmorland (1145551)", National Heritage List for England
- Historic England, "Nos. 12 and 14 High Wiend, Appleby-in-Westmorland (1158184)", National Heritage List for England
- Historic England, "Nos. 1, 2, and 3 Mill Hill, Appleby-in-Westmorland (1145554)", National Heritage List for England
- Historic England, "No. 1 Scattergate, Appleby-in-Westmorland (1158429)", National Heritage List for England
- Historic England, "Barn to north of No. 1 Scattergate, Appleby-in-Westmorland (1145561)", National Heritage List for England
- Historic England, "Outer wall to Appleby Castle grounds, from South Lodge to the river, Appleby-in-Westmorland (1311497)", National Heritage List for England
- Historic England, "Outer wall to Appleby Castle grounds, from North Lodge to South Lodge, Appleby-in-Westmorland (1319066)", National Heritage List for England
- Historic England, "Howgate Foot, No. 3 The Sands, Appleby-in-Westmorland (1145559)", National Heritage List for England
- Historic England, "Barn on north side of yard at rear of No. 34 Boroughgate (Glen Hotel), Appleby-in-Westmorland (1145577)", National Heritage List for England
- Historic England, "Bongate Mill, Appleby-in-Westmorland (1145555)", National Heritage List for England
- Historic England, "Barrowmoor, Barn attached to Barrowmoor, Appleby-in-Westmorland (1158050)", National Heritage List for England
- Historic England, "Friary Cottage and barn adjoining Friary Cottage, Appleby-in-Westmorland (1145595)", National Heritage List for England
- Historic England, "Barn to rear of No. 34 Boroughgate (Glen Hotel), Appleby-in-Westmorland (1146481)", National Heritage List for England
- Historic England, "The Grapes Hotel Nos. 29 to 31 The Sands, Appleby-in-Westmorland (1158398)", National Heritage List for England
- Historic England, "Hare and Hounds, Appleby-in-Westmorland (1311975)", National Heritage List for England
- Historic England, "Low Cross, Appleby-in-Westmorland (1138035)", National Heritage List for England
- Historic England, "Mill House, Appleby-in-Westmorland (1311532)", National Heritage List for England
- Historic England, "Old Hall, Appleby-in-Westmorland (1145603)", National Heritage List for England
- Historic England, "The Old Hall, Appleby-in-Westmorland (1145550)", National Heritage List for England
- Historic England, "Rose Cottage, Appleby-in-Westmorland (1137794)", National Heritage List for England
- Historic England, "The White House, Appleby-in-Westmorland (1319012)", National Heritage List for England
- Historic England, "Former White Hart And Stable To The Rear, 34 Boroughgate, Appleby-in-Westmorland (1145576)", National Heritage List for England
- Historic England, "The Police Station, Appleby-in-Westmorland (1145558)", National Heritage List for England
- Historic England, "No. 16 Boroughgate, Appleby-in-Westmorland (1146455)", National Heritage List for England
- Historic England, "No. 3 Bongate, Appleby-in-Westmorland (1145596)", National Heritage List for England
- Historic England, "No. 6 Bongate and adjoining barn and outbuildings, Appleby-in-Westmorland (1145601)", National Heritage List for England
- Historic England, "Nos. 23 and 25 Boroughgate, Appleby-in-Westmorland (1138240)", National Heritage List for England
- Historic England, "No. 40 Boroughgate, Appleby-in-Westmorland (1146496)", National Heritage List for England
- Historic England, "No. 50 Boroughgate, Appleby-in-Westmorland (1145580)", National Heritage List for England
- Historic England, "Nos. 60 and 62 Boroughgate, Appleby-in-Westmorland (1157871)", National Heritage List for England
- Historic England, "Nos. 16 to 19 Chapel Street, Appleby-in-Westmorland (1145587)", National Heritage List for England
- Historic England, "Nos. 20 to 26 Chapel Street, Appleby-in-Westmorland (1158010)", National Heritage List for England
- Historic England, "Nos. 27, 28 and 29 Chapel Street, Appleby-in-Westmorland (1319040)", National Heritage List for England
- Historic England, "Nos. 30, 31 and 32 Chapel Street, Appleby-in-Westmorland (1158023)", National Heritage List for England
- Historic England, "A'board Inn, Appleby-in-Westmorland (1145612)", National Heritage List for England
- Historic England, "Church View, Appleby-in-Westmorland (1137721)", National Heritage List for England
- Historic England, "Gardener's Cottage, Appleby-in-Westmorland (1158435)", National Heritage List for England
- Historic England, "Westmorland House, Appleby-in-Westmorland (1145573)", National Heritage List for England
- Historic England, "Garden wall, gateway and summerhouse to north-east and south-east of the White House, Appleby-in-Westmorland (1311899)", National Heritage List for England
- Historic England, "Former outbuilding stable and coach house to the White House, Appleby-in-Westmorland (1145611)", National Heritage List for England
- Historic England, "White Rails, Appleby-in-Westmorland (1145569)", National Heritage List for England
- Historic England, "Shire Hall, Appleby-in-Westmorland (1380199)", National Heritage List for England
- Historic England, "Rhondda House, Appleby-in-Westmorland (1145562)", National Heritage List for England
- Historic England, "Castle Bank House, Appleby-in-Westmorland (1157942)", National Heritage List for England
- Historic England, "No. 32 Boroughgate, Appleby-in-Westmorland (1145575)", National Heritage List for England
- Historic England, "Nos. 49 to 55 Boroughgate, Appleby-in-Westmorland (1145572)", National Heritage List for England
- Historic England, "Bank Barn on roadside to south of Barrowmoor, Appleby-in-Westmorland (1145590)", National Heritage List for England
- Historic England, "Bongate House, Appleby-in-Westmorland (1137736)", National Heritage List for England
- Historic England, "The Golden Ball Hotel, Appleby-in-Westmorland (1319064)", National Heritage List for England
- Historic England, "Old Brewery, Appleby-in-Westmorland (1145549)", National Heritage List for England
- Historic England, "Mallard House and Tarka, Appleby-in-Westmorland (1145589)", National Heritage List for England
- Historic England, "Barley Cottage and The Shieling, Appleby-in-Westmorland (1319062)", National Heritage List for England
- Historic England, "Parkinhill Farmhouse Barn attached to Parkinhill Farmhouse, Appleby-in-Westmorland (1158356)", National Heritage List for England
- Historic England, "The Terrace, Appleby-in-Westmorland (1145600)", National Heritage List for England
- Historic England, "Beech Croft, Appleby-in-Westmorland (1145598)", National Heritage List for England
- Historic England, "The Cloisters, Appleby-in-Westmorland (1319048)", National Heritage List for England
- Historic England, "No. 11 Bongate, Appleby-in-Westmorland (1137684)", National Heritage List for England
- Historic England, "Nos. 42 and 44 Boroughgate, Appleby-in-Westmorland (1145579)", National Heritage List for England
- Historic England, "Nos. 46 and 48 Boroughgate, Appleby-in-Westmorland (1311760)", National Heritage List for England
- Historic England, "Nos. 1 and 3 Bridge Street, Appleby-in-Westmorland (1157880)", National Heritage List for England
- Historic England, "No. 4 Bridge Street, Appleby-in-Westmorland (1157929)", National Heritage List for England
- Historic England, "Nos. 5 and 7 Bridge Street, Appleby-in-Westmorland (1319037)", National Heritage List for England
- Historic England, "No. 33 Chapel Street, Appleby-in-Westmorland (1145588)", National Heritage List for England
- Historic England, "Nos. 1 and 3 Bridge Street, Appleby-in-Westmorland (1157880)", National Heritage List for England
- Historic England, "Nos. 6 (Bardon House), 7, 8 and 9 Doomgate, Appleby-in-Westmorland (1145548)", National Heritage List for England
- Historic England, "Nos. 16 to 18, High Wiend, Appleby-in-Westmorland (1145552)", National Heritage List for England
- Historic England, "Bank House, Appleby-in-Westmorland (1319032)", National Heritage List for England
- Historic England, "Barbadoes Lodge, Appleby-in-Westmorland (1158038)", National Heritage List for England
- Historic England, "Courtfield Hotel, Appleby-in-Westmorland (1145602)", National Heritage List for England
- Historic England, "The Friary, Appleby-in-Westmorland (1145594)", National Heritage List for England
- Historic England, "Entrance gate piers gates and railings to The Friary, Appleby-in-Westmorland (1319044)", National Heritage List for England
- Historic England, "Kirkstone House with integral farm buildings adjoining on south, Appleby-in-Westmorland (1319045)", National Heritage List for England
- Historic England, "Milestone on footpath in front of No. 7 Bongate, Appleby-in-Westmorland (1145597)", National Heritage List for England
- Historic England, "Eden Bridge Cafe Shop attached to Eden Bridge Cafe, Appleby-in-Westmorland (1145557)", National Heritage List for England
- Historic England, "No. 33A Chapel Street, Appleby-in-Westmorland (1457818)", National Heritage List for England
- Historic England, "New House, Appleby-in-Westmorland (1145556)", National Heritage List for England
- Historic England, "Former British School, Appleby-in-Westmorland (1157969)", National Heritage List for England
- Historic England, "Nos. 15 and 17 Boroughgate, Appleby-in-Westmorland (1319011)", National Heritage List for England
- Historic England, "No. 54 Boroughgate, Appleby-in-Westmorland (1146532)", National Heritage List for England
- Historic England, "Nos. 56 and 58 Boroughgate, Appleby-in-Westmorland (1145582)", National Heritage List for England
- Historic England, "No. 9 Bridge Street, Appleby-in-Westmorland (1157923)", National Heritage List for England
- Historic England, "No. 1 High Wiend, Appleby-in-Westmorland (1319065)", National Heritage List for England
- Historic England, "No. 30 Boroughgate, Appleby-in-Westmorland (1145568)", National Heritage List for England
- Historic England, "Footbridge at Appleby Station, Appleby-in-Westmorland (1145563)", National Heritage List for England
- Historic England, "Midland Bank, Appleby-in-Westmorland (1145610)", National Heritage List for England
- Historic England, "Entrance gates, piers, and wall to Castle park, from Boroughgate, Appleby-in-Westmorland (1312080)", National Heritage List for England
- Historic England, "North Lodge to Appleby Castle, Appleby-in-Westmorland (1145606)", National Heritage List for England
- Historic England, "Tufton Arms Hotel and shop, Appleby-in-Westmorland (1319035)", National Heritage List for England
- Historic England, "No. 14 Boroughgate, Appleby-in-Westmorland (1145574)", National Heritage List for England
- Historic England, "Lamp Post on north side of High Cross, Appleby-in-Westmorland (1145608)", National Heritage List for England
- Historic England, "Appleby Station, Main Building, Appleby-in-Westmorland (1311476)", National Heritage List for England
- Historic England, "Appleby Station, East Platform Building, Appleby-in-Westmorland (1319067)", National Heritage List for England
- Historic England, "Barclay's Bank, Appleby-in-Westmorland (1138203)", National Heritage List for England
- Historic England, "Main building at Appleby Grammar School, Appleby-in-Westmorland (1312225)", National Heritage List for England
- Historic England, "St. Lawrence's Bridge, Appleby-in-Westmorland (1145583)", National Heritage List for England
- Historic England, "Appleby Boer War Memorial, Appleby-in-Westmorland (1461431)", National Heritage List for England
- Historic England, "War Memorial in St Lawrence's Churchyard, Appleby-in-Westmorland (1455779)", National Heritage List for England
- Historic England, "Appleby Cemetery War Memorial Obelisk, Appleby-in-Westmorland (1455774)", National Heritage List for England
- Historic England, "Nos. 31, 33 and 35 Bongate, Appleby-in-Westmorland (1137702)", National Heritage List for England
- Historic England, Listed Buildings
- Hyde, Matthew; Pevsner, Nikolaus (2010) [1967], Cumbria, The Buildings of England, New Haven and London: Yale University Press, ISBN 978-0-300-12663-1
