= Listed buildings in Hoff, Cumbria =

Hoff is a civil parish in Westmorland and Furness, Cumbria, England. It contains nine listed buildings that are recorded in the National Heritage List for England. Of these, three are listed at Grade II*, the middle of the three grades, and the others are at Grade II, the lowest grade. The parish is mainly rural, with scattered communities, and the listed buildings are all houses, farmhouses, or farm buildings.

== Key ==
Grade	Criteria
II*	Particularly important buildings of more than special interest
II	Buildings of national importance and special interest

== Buildings ==
Name and location	Photograph	Date	Notes	Grade
Hoff Row; 54.55187°N 2.51027°W	—	16th century	A farmhouse that was extended in the 18th and 19th centuries. It is in stone with quoins and a slate roof. There are two storeys, four bays, a single-storey extension to the north and a two-storey extension to the south. The doorway has moulded jambs and an initialled and dated lintel. The windows were originally mullioned, some have been blocked and others have replacement sashes.	II
Barwise Hall, barn and byre 54.55311°N 2.52725°W	—	1579	A stair wing was added to the house in 1676. The house is rendered on a plinth, with quoins, a cornice embattled on the east side, and a slate roof with coped stepped gables. There are two storeys and four bays. The doorway has an architrave with a paired semicircular head, and the windows are mullioned with hood moulds. Above the door is a moulded panel containing a coat of arms, initials and the date. The barn to the west is dated 1835; it has three doors and one wagon entrance, all with segmental heads, imposts and keystones.	II*
Drybeck Hall and attached buildings 54.53261°N 2.51233°W		1679	A stone house on a plinth with a slate roof, and a rear outshut with a stone-flagged roof. There are two storeys and eight bays. The doorway has chamfered jambs and a lintel with carved crenellation, initials and a date. Most of the windows are mullioned, and some are 20th-century replacements. There is a string course above the ground floor windows, and a continuous hood mould above the upper floor windows. To the right is a byre dating from the early 18th century with doors and external steps leading up to a loft doorway.	II*
Bank barn, Barwise Hall; 54.55321°N 2.52839°W	—	1681	The barn is in stone on a plinth, with quoins and a roof partly of slate, partly of asbestos sheet, with stone coped gables. There are two storeys and an outshut with an entry at the rear. On the front, steps with parapets lead up to a doorway with chamfered jambs and a dated and initialled lintel. Other openings include a mullioned window, doors, ventilation slits, and a wagon entrance with a segmental head.	II*
Nag's Head farmhouse and byre 54.54656°N 2.52983°W		Mid 18th century	Originally a barn, later partly converted into an inn, and then into a farmhouse. The building is in stone with quoins, the farmhouse to the left is pebbledashed, and the roof is slated. The house has three storeys and three bays, and the original openings have been converted into sash windows with a door inserted between them. The barn contains two doorways and a loft door, all with segmental heads, and to the right is a lean-to.	II
White House Farmhouse; 54.55292°N 2.50387°W	—	Late 18th or early 19th century	A rendered stone house with quoins and a slate roof with a stone ridge. There are two storeys and a symmetrical front of three bays. The central doorway has imposts and a cornice, and the windows are sashes with stone surrounds. At the rear is a stair window with a semicircular traceried head and imposts.	II
Barn, Burrells House; 54.55793°N 2.49795°W	—	1818	The barn is in stone with quoins, and has a slate roof with a stone ridge. There are various openings. On the east wall is a pedimented panel containing an initialled and dated shield. (Note: Google Street View in April 2010 showed that the barn has been converted for residential use.)	II
Outbuildings, Barwise Hall; 54.55321°N 2.52706°W	—	Mid 19th century	The outbuildings are in a single storey attached at right angles to the hall, and comprise a cottage, stores and a pigsty. They are in stone, with quoins, and have a slate roof. The doorways have segmental heads and projecting keystones.	II
Burrells House; 54.55813°N 2.49798°W	—	19th century	A pebbledashed house with a green slate roof. There are two storeys and four bays. On the front are two doors, and various types of windows.	II

== Notes and references ==
=== Sources ===
- Historic England, "Hoff Row adjoining stable and addition to south, Hoff (1144897)", National Heritage List for England
- Historic England, "Barwise Hall and adjoining barn and byre, Hoff (1288861)", National Heritage List for England
- Historic England, "Drybeck Hall and attached buildings, Hoff (1144937)", National Heritage List for England
- Historic England, "Bank barn to north-west of Barwise Hall, Hoff (1144898)", National Heritage List for England
- Historic England, "Nag's Head farmhouse and attached byre, Hoff (1144900)", National Heritage List for England
- Historic England, "White House Farmhouse, Hoff (1288855)", National Heritage List for England
- Historic England, "Barn to south of Burrells House, Hoff (1144936)", National Heritage List for England
- Historic England, "Cottage, store, and pigsty built at right angles to east end of Barwise Hall, Hoff (1144899)", National Heritage List for England
- Historic England, "Burrells House, Hoff (1137215)", National Heritage List for England
- Historic England, Listed Buildings
- Hyde, Matthew; Pevsner, Nikolaus (2010) [1967], Cumbria, The Buildings of England, New Haven and London: Yale University Press, ISBN 978-0-300-12663-1
