= Hoff, Cumbria =

Hamlet and civil parish in Cumbria, England

Coordinates: 54.552°N 2.502°W

Hoff
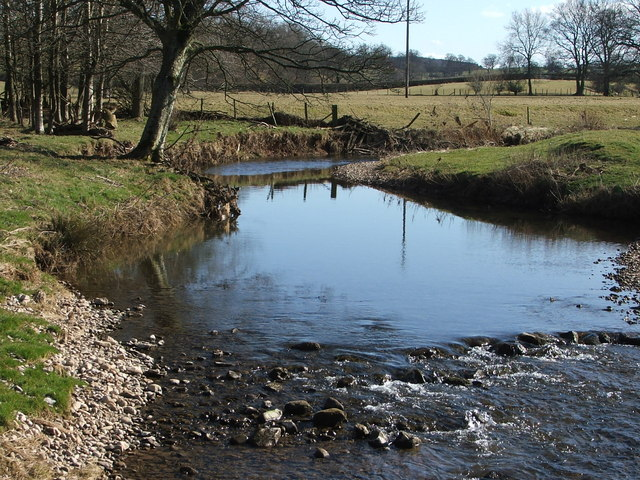
- Hoff Beck

- Location within Cumbria
- Population: 164 (2011)
- OS grid reference: NY67551760
- Civil parish: Hoff
- Unitary authority: Westmorland and Furness
- Ceremonial county: Cumbria
- Region: North West
- Country: England
- Sovereign state: United Kingdom
- Post town: APPLEBY IN WESTMORLAND
- Postcode district: CA16
- Dialling code: 017683
- Police: Cumbria
- Fire: Cumbria
- Ambulance: North West
- UK Parliament: Westmorland and Lonsdale

Hoff is a hamlet and civil parish in the unitary authority area of Westmorland and Furness and the ceremonial county of Cumbria, in England.

The hamlet of Hoff lies some 3 kilometres (1.9 mi) south-west of the town of Appleby-in-Westmorland. It consists of a number of a number of houses and a pub, The New Inn, which re-opened in 2011 after a number of years of closure. There is also a postbox and, formerly, a pioneering solar-powered lamppost. The name Hoff originates from old Norse and means 'a heathen sanctuary or temple'.

The civil parish of Hoff includes, as well as Hoff itself, the hamlets of Drybeck and Burrells. At the 2001 census the parish had a population of 189, decreasing to 164 at the 2011 Census.

There is no Church of England parish church in either the hamlet or civil parish of Hoff. Both are within the ecclesiastical parish of Appleby St Lawrence.

Hoff Beck forms on the southern border of the parish, with the confluence of Scale Beck and Asby Beck, and flows through both parish and hamlet. Between the confluence and Hoff hamlet, the beck flows over Rutter Force, a 30-foot (9.1 m) high waterfall.

== See also ==
- Listed buildings in Hoff, Cumbria
