= St Lawrence's Church, Appleby =

Coordinates: 54.5782°N 2.4915°W

St Lawrence's Church
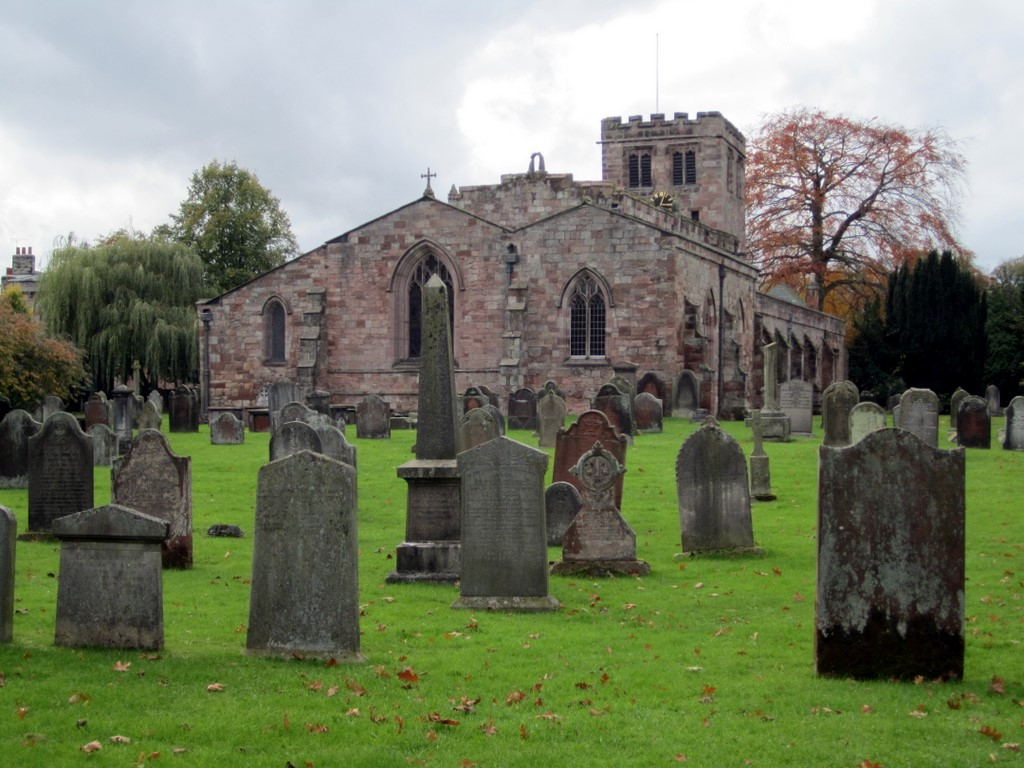
- St Lawrence's Church from the east

- Location in Eden, Cumbria Location in Cumbria, England
- OS grid reference: NY 683 204
- Location: Boroughgate, Appleby-in-Westmorland, Cumbria CA16 6QN
- Country: England
- Denomination: Anglican
- Churchmanship: Central
- Website: St Lawrence, Appleby

History
- Status: Parish church

Architecture
- Functional status: Active
- Heritage designation: Grade I
- Designated: 6 June 1951
- Architectural type: Church
- Style: Norman, Gothic

Specifications
- Materials: Stone, lead roofs

Administration
- Diocese: Carlisle
- Archdeaconry: Carlisle
- Deanery: Appleby
- Parish: Appleby

Clergy
- Rector: Revd Andrew Burrell

St Lawrence's Church is in Boroughgate, Appleby-in-Westmorland, Cumbria, England. It is an active Anglican parish church in the deanery of Appleby, the archdeaconry of Carlisle, and the diocese of Carlisle. Sunday worship is at 10.45am and on Fridays at 10am. The church is recorded in the National Heritage List for England as a designated Grade I listed building.

The ecclesiastical parish of Appleby St Lawrence covers the town of Appleby, together with a large surrounding area, including the civil parishes of Hoff, Colby, Crackenthorpe and Murton. It is one of ten parishes which form the Heart of Eden benefice.

== History ==
The lower part of the tower dates from about 1150. The south porch is from the 13th century, and the body of the church dates from the 14th and 15th centuries. In 1655 Lady Anne Clifford restored the church, and rebuilt the north chapel and the chancel. Ceilings were added by Christopher Hodgson in 1830–31. There were further restorations in 1861–62, and in 1960.

St Lawrence's Church suffered severe flooding in December 2015 from the overflowing River Eden.

== Architecture ==
=== Exterior ===
The church is constructed in stone with lead roofs. Its plan consists of a nave with a clerestory, north and south aisles, a chancel, a northeast chapel, a southwest porch, and a west tower. The tower and the clerestory are castellated. The base of the tower is Norman, and the rest of the exterior is in Perpendicular style. In the tower is a clock dating from 1699.

=== Interior ===
The interior of the church is in Decorated style. The nave arcades are in five bays. The screens date from about 1500. The octagonal 19th-century font is in black Frosterley Marble. At the front of the church is a corporation pew. Three of the windows in the south aisle contain stained glass by Heaton, Butler and Bayne, and the rest is by William Wailes or by Wailes and Strang. The northeast chapel contains the monuments of Lady Anne Clifford, and her mother Lady Margaret Clifford who died in 1616. Lady Margaret's monument is free-standing in black marble with an alabaster effigy, and is attributed to Maximilian Colt, the King's Master Carver. Lady Anne's monument was created during her lifetime in about 1655–57 (she died in 1676). It is in black-and-white marble, with no effigy but a reredos with a family tree consisting of shields. Also in the church is a 14th-century female effigy. The two-manual pipe organ was built in 1661 by Robert Preston for Carlisle Cathedral. Together with its original case, it was given to St Lawrence's by the dean of the cathedral in 1683. It stands at the west end of the church under the tower arch. The case contains three turrets, each bearing an achievement of arms on its summit; beneath the cornice are the heads of three putti. There is a ring of six bells, all of which were cast in 1833 by Thomas Mears II of the Whitechapel Bell Foundry.

== See also ==
- Grade I listed churches in Cumbria
- Listed buildings in Appleby-in-Westmorland
