= Appleby Castle =

Castle in Cumbria, England

Coordinates: 54.57423°N 2.48878°W

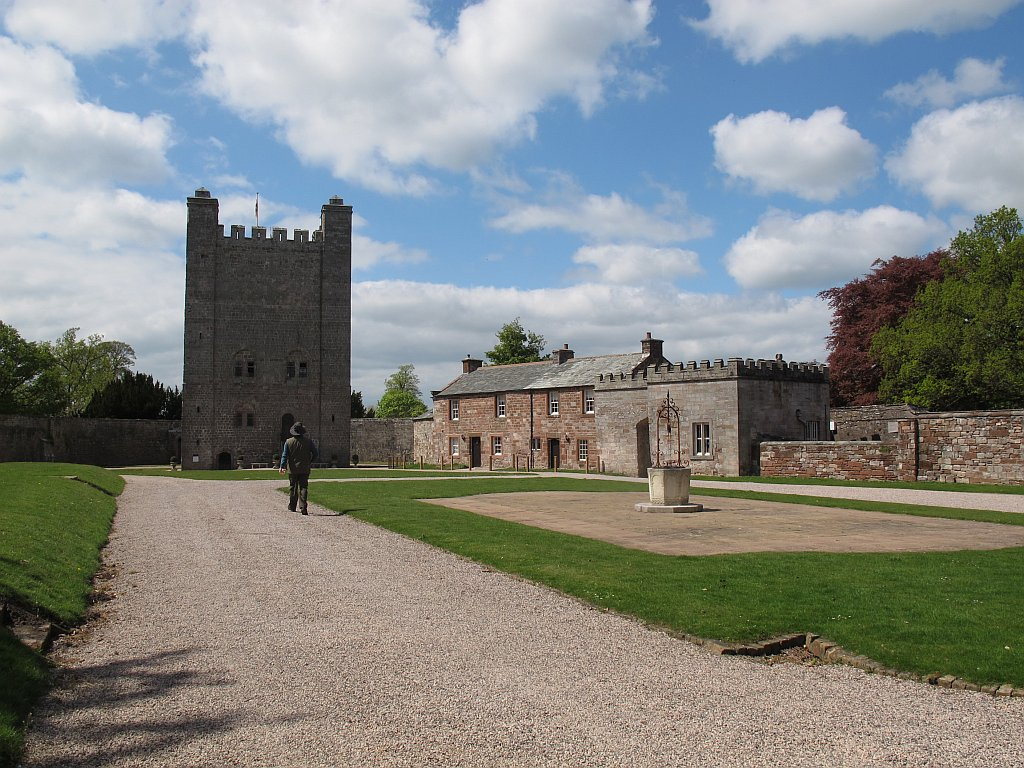

- Location within Cumbria
- Location: Appleby-in-Westmorland

Site notes
- Owner: Sally Nightingale

Listed Building – Grade I
- Designated parts: gateway to the castle courtyard and two adjoining cottages

Listed Building – Grade II*
- Designated parts: sandstone outer walls

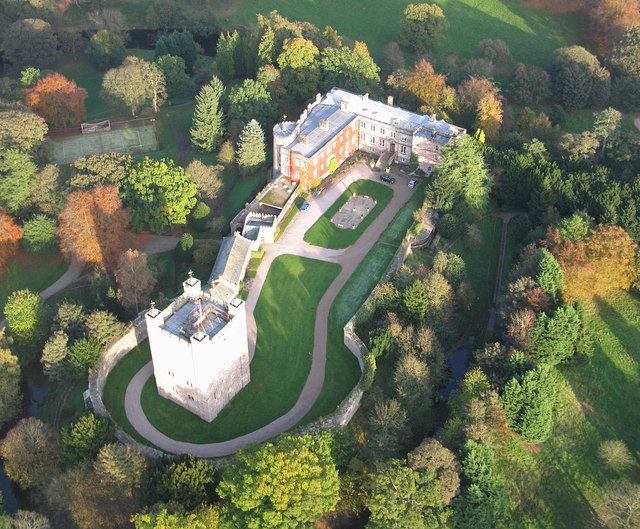
Appleby Castle from above

Appleby Castle is in the town of Appleby-in-Westmorland overlooking the River Eden (grid reference NY685200). It consists of a 12th-century castle keep which is known as Caesar's Tower, and a mansion house. These, together with their associated buildings, are set in a courtyard surrounded by curtain walls. Caesar's Tower and the mansion house are each recorded in the National Heritage List for England as a designated Grade I listed building. The uninhabited parts of the castle are a scheduled ancient monument.

== History ==
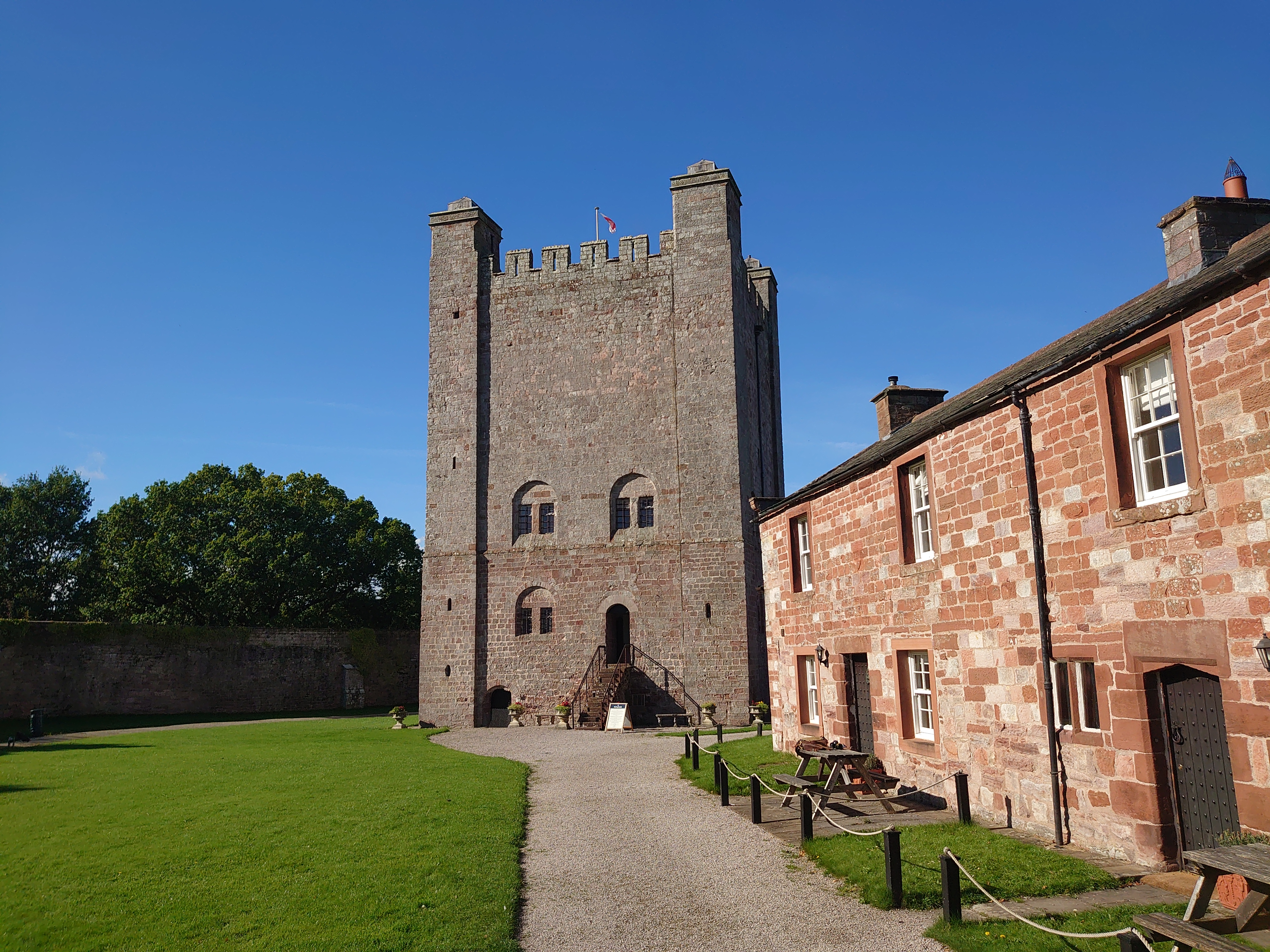
The 12th-century Caesar's Tower

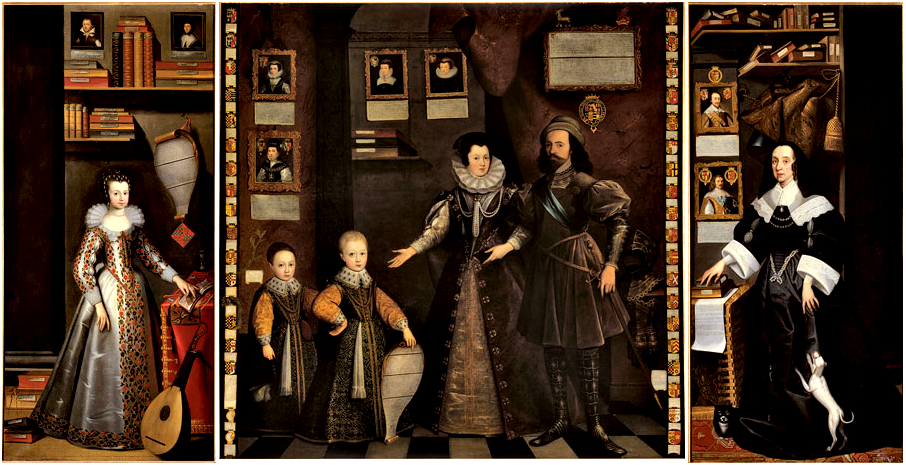
The Great Picture, a huge triptych measuring 8ft 5" high and 16ft 2" wide, commissioned in 1646 by Anne Clifford, attributed to Jan van Belcamp (1610–1653), formerly hung in Appleby Castle

Ranulf le Meschin founded the castle at the beginning of the 12th century. In about 1170 the square stone keep known as Caesar's Tower was built. The castle was in royal hands when the Scottish king, William the Lion, invaded the Eden Valley in 1174. The constable of the castle surrendered without a fight.

In 1203 the castle was granted to Robert I de Vipont by King John. In 1264 it came into the possession of Roger de Clifford, through his marriage to Isabel de Vipont, one of the two daughters and co-heiress of Robert II de Vipont. Appleby Castle remained for nearly 400 years in the ownership of the Clifford family, who were responsible for much restoration of the castle. Roger's son, Robert de Clifford, inherited the castle in 1282.

The north wall of house and the west part of the north wing with the round tower date from the 13th century. The eastern part of the house was built in 1454.

King James I stayed in the castle in 1617, between visits to Brougham Castle and Wharton Hall. In the mid-17th century, Lady Anne Clifford made the castle her home. The castle was partly dismantled following a siege by roundhead forces in 1648, during the Second English Civil War. However, it was restored by Lady Anne Clifford in 1651–53. On her death the castle passed to the Earls of Thanet. They were responsible for converting the hall block into a classical mansion house. The upper parts of Caesar's Tower were altered in the 17th and 18th centuries. The house was largely rebuilt in 1686 and the northwest wing was added in 1695. In the 19th century it was again restored and sash windows were inserted.

Ferguson Industrial Holdings (FIH PLC) purchased the castle in 1973 and it became the primary residence of Denis Vernon, the company's CEO, and his family. The Vernons lived at Appleby Castle until 1990. Vernon, a passionate conservationist, established a rare breeds survival centre. Considerable improvements were made to the fabric of all the buildings, not least the 12th-century keep. During this period, the castle was the headquarters and training centre of FIH PLC and for those running the conservation centre. Documentary and movie director Susannah White featured Denis Vernon and Appleby Castle in her 1998 BBC documentary The Gypsies Are Coming on Appleby Horse Fair.

The castle was bought by Christopher Nightingale in 1998. In 2009, Mrs. Sally Nightingale became the sole owner of Appleby Castle. The castle and grounds are open to the public during specified hours. The keep houses the Norman Centre, a museum and interactive experience.

In 2024, the castle was put up for sale at an asking price of £9.5m, reduced to £5.5m in 2025.

== Structure ==
Caesar's Tower is built in grey stone rubble and ashlar. It is about 80 feet (24 m) high and has four storeys. The main house is in two wings which are at right angles to each other. A semicircular round tower protrudes from the north wall of the north wing and a large square tower is at the south end of the east wing.

== Other features ==
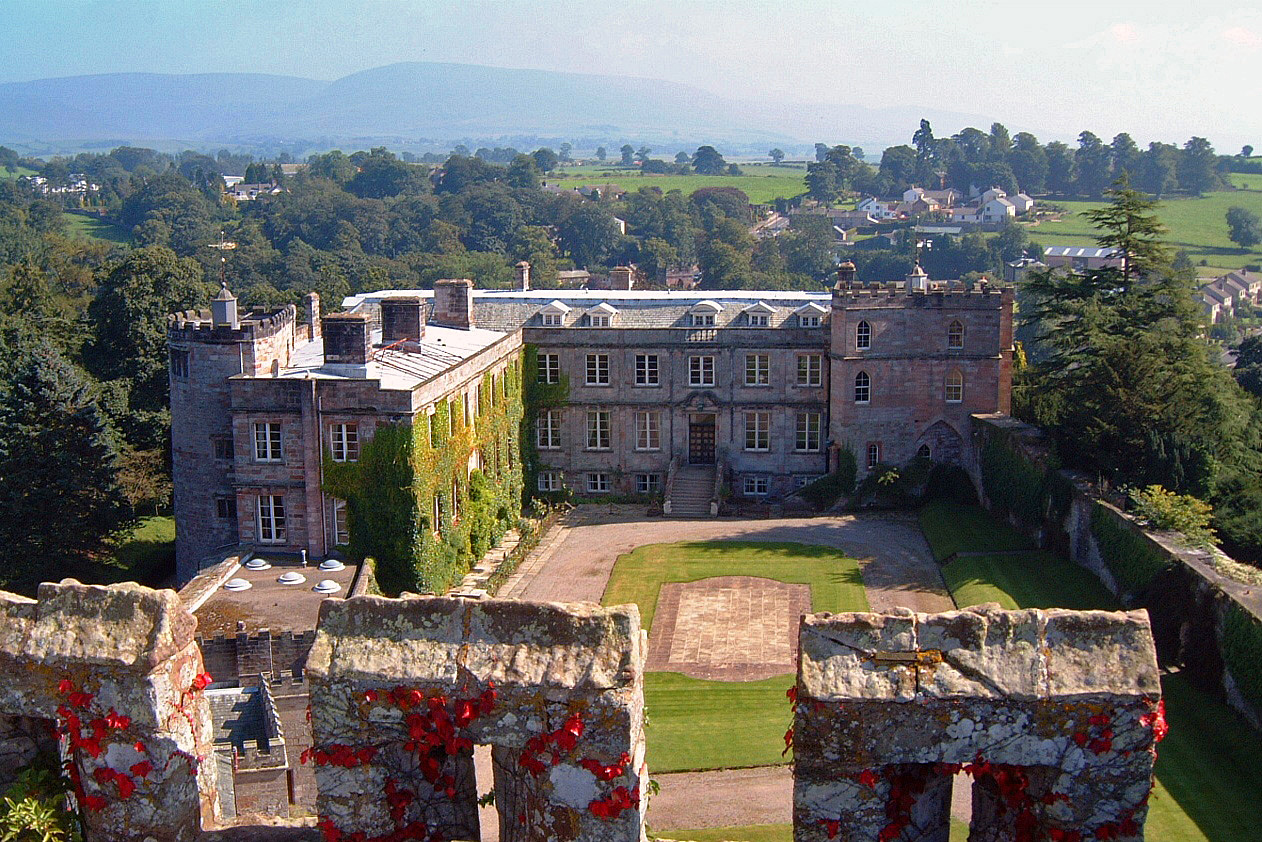
East range of Appleby Castle in 2002

The gateway to the castle courtyard and two adjoining cottages are listed Grade I. The gateway is in grey stone and battlemented, dating probably from the 17th century. In the grounds of the castle is Lady Anne's Beehouse, which was built by Lady Anne Clifford in the middle of the 17th century. It is a square stone building in two storeys with a pyramid roof and a door on the lower level. The upper level has a pointed arched window on each of three sides and a door on the fourth side. It is also listed Grade I. Two stretches of the sandstone outer walls to the castle dating mostly from the 18th and 19th centuries are listed Grade II, as is the battlemented North Lodge which dates from the 19th century. The grounds around the castle are listed Grade II*.

== See also ==
- Grade I listed buildings in Cumbria
- Grade II* listed buildings in Cumbria
- Listed buildings in Appleby-in-Westmorland
- Castles in Great Britain and Ireland
- List of castles in England
