= Appleby-in-Westmorland =

Market town in Cumbria, England

Coordinates: 54.577°N 2.485°W

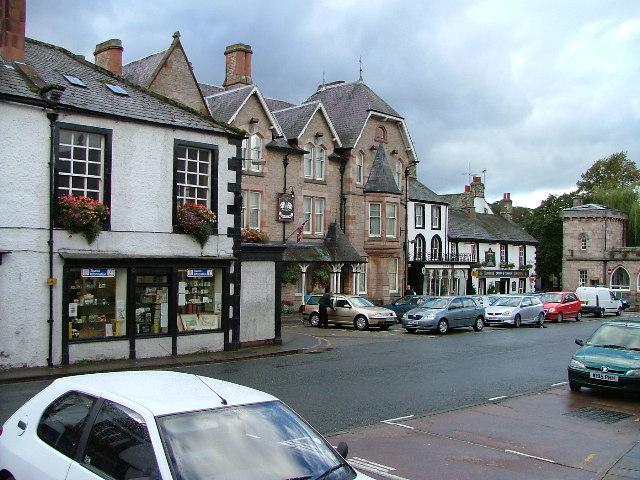
- Boroughgate (2004)

- Flag

- Location in Eden, Cumbria Location within Cumbria
- Population: 3,228 (2021 Census)
- OS grid reference: NY6820
- Civil parish: Appleby-in-Westmorland
- Unitary authority: Westmorland and Furness
- Ceremonial county: Cumbria
- Region: North West
- Country: England
- Sovereign state: United Kingdom
- Post town: APPLEBY-IN-WESTMORLAND
- Postcode district: CA16
- Dialling code: 017683
- Police: Cumbria
- Fire: Cumbria
- Ambulance: North West
- UK Parliament: Westmorland and Lonsdale
- Website: https://applebytown.gov.uk/

Appleby-in-Westmorland is a market town and civil parish in Westmorland and Furness, Cumbria, England. Crossed by the River Eden, it lies 14 miles (23 km) south-east of Penrith, 32 miles (51 km) south-east of Carlisle, 27 miles (43 km) north-east of Kendal and 45 miles (72 km) west of Darlington. It had a population of 3,228 at the 2021 Census.

Appleby is the county town of the historic county of Westmorland. It was known just as Appleby until 1974–1976, when the council of the successor parish to the borough changed it to retain the name Westmorland, which was abolished as an administrative area under the Local Government Act 1972, before being revived as Westmorland and Furness in 2023.

== History ==
The town's name derives from the Old English æppel-by, meaning "farm or settlement with apple trees".

St Lawrence's Parish Church is recorded in the National Heritage List for England as a designated Grade I listed building. Appleby Castle was founded by Ranulf le Meschin in the early 12th century. The Borough followed by royal charter in 1179 and the Moot Hall was built about 1596. Surviving timbers in the roof had been felled between 1571 and 1596. In the Second English Civil War Appleby was placed under a siege, in which the Regicide Major General Thomas Harrison was wounded.

Appleby Grammar School dates from two chantry bequests in 1286. It was incorporated by Letters Patent of Queen Elizabeth in 1574. George Washington's father and two half-brothers, born in Virginia, were educated at Appleby Grammar School. He would have followed, but his father died suddenly in 1743, just as he reached the age when the two older boys had made the voyage.

== Economy ==
Appleby is overlooked by the privately owned Appleby Castle, a largely Norman structure that served as home to Lady Anne Clifford in the 17th century. Appleby's main industry is tourism, through its history, remoteness and scenery, and its proximity to the Lake District, North Pennines, Swaledale and Howgill Fells.

From 1973 Ferguson Industrial Holdings Plc was based at Appleby Castle. WA Developments Limited, now Stobart Rail Limited, was long based in Appleby as a civil engineering firm founded by Andrew Tinkler and William Stobart, specialising in railway maintenance.

Appleby's economy is based mainly on the service sector, in small firms, eating houses and pubs. The private shops include butchers, grocers, bakers and newsagents. Appleby Creamery makes premium, hand-made cheeses, including Eden Valley Brie.

== Events ==
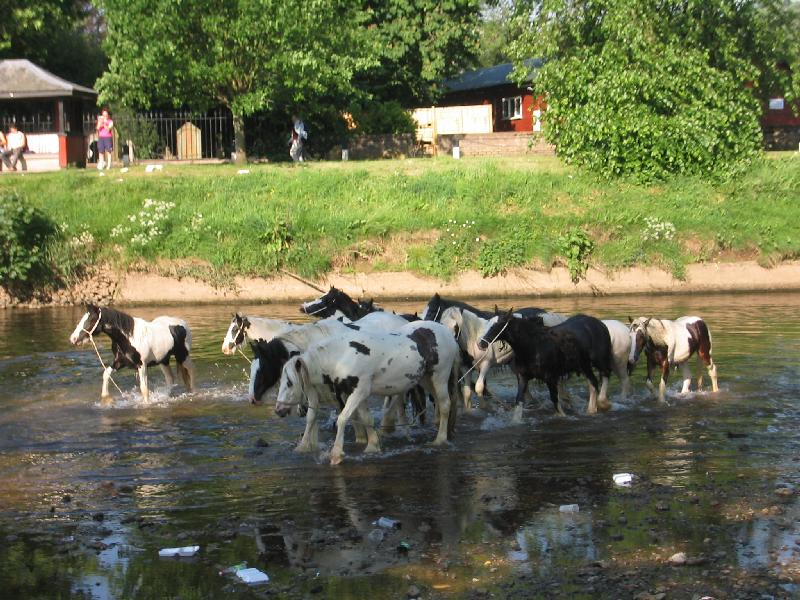
Gypsy horses in the River Eden

Appleby and nearby villages host old-established events such as Warcop rushbearing, dating back at least to 1716.

The four-day Appleby Horse Fair is held on the first weekend of June.

Appleby Agricultural Society, founded in 1841, puts on an annual show. From 1989 to 2007 various venues in the town hosted the Appleby Jazz Festival.

Other local events are listed on the community website.

== Governance ==
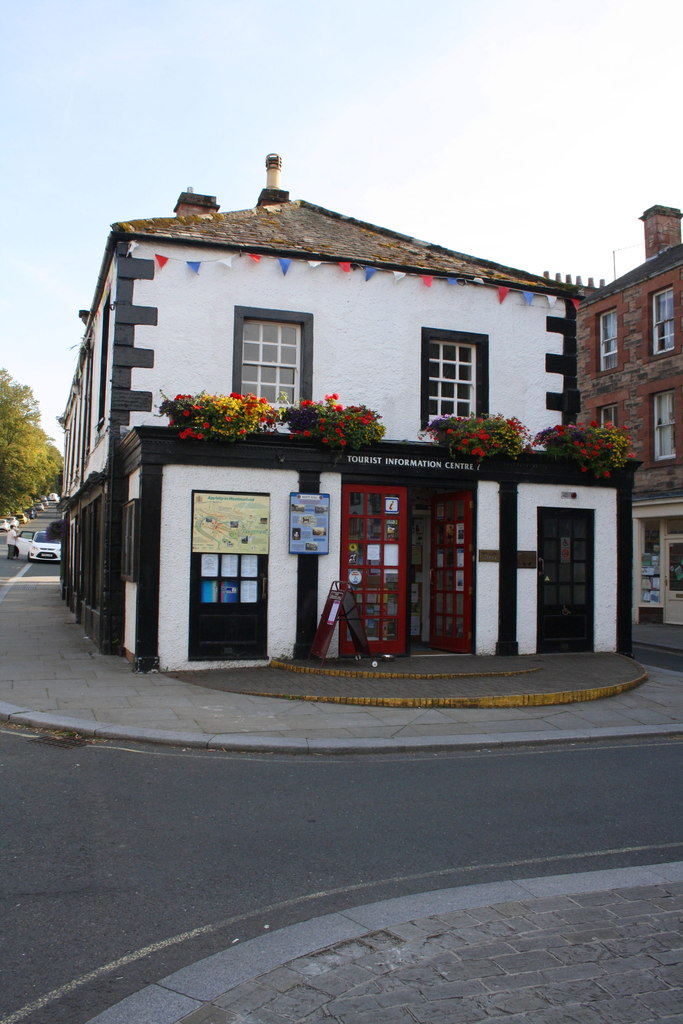
The Moot Hall

Appleby was a parliamentary borough from medieval times, electing two Members of Parliament (MPs). By the 18th century it was a pocket borough, whose members were effectively in the gift of the Lowther family. They included William Pitt the Younger, who was MP for Appleby when he became Prime Minister in 1783, although he stood down in the next general election, preferring to take a Cambridge University seat.

A later Appleby member was Viscount Howick, later as Earl Grey the Prime Minister under whom the Reform Act 1832 was passed. However, that did not save it from losing both members under the act. As the only county town disenfranchised, Appleby was a controversial case in the debates on the Reform Bill, where the opposition attempted vainly to save it at least one MP. It gained a new charter in 1885.

The town remained a municipal borough until such status was abolished under the Local Government Act 1972. It was superseded by Eden district, based in Penrith.

Appleby was the county town of Westmorland. The Courts of Assise met at the Shire Hall there, although the former county council sat at the County Hall in Kendal.

=== Present ===
Appleby today is in the parliamentary constituency of Westmorland and Lonsdale.

For local government purposes it now forms part of Westmorland and Furness unitary authority. It formerly bridged the Appleby and Bongate wards of Eden District Council and the Appleby Ward of Cumbria County Council. Its own parish council is named Appleby-in-Westmorland Town Council.

== Media ==
Local news and television programmes are provided by BBC North East and Cumbria and ITV Border. Television signals are received from the Caldbeck TV transmitter. Appleby's local radio stations are BBC Radio Cumbria, Greatest Hits Radio Cumbria & South West Scotland, and community based station Eden FM Radio which broadcast from its studios in Penrith. The town's local newspapers are Cumberland and Westmorland Herald and The Westmorland Gazette.

== Transport ==
Appleby railway station is a stop on the Settle-Carlisle Line. It was opened by the Midland Railway in 1876. Northern Trains operates a generally two-hourly service in each direction between Leeds and Carlisle, via Settle.

Appleby East station also served the town on the North Eastern Railway; it was closed in 1962.

As of March 2026 the town is served by two bus routes:

- 563 connects Kirkby Stephen with Penrith; it is operated by Stagecoach Cumbria
- S6 links Sedbergh and Penrith; it is operated by Western Dales Community Bus

== Notable people ==
A chronological list of notables from Appleby with a Wikipedia page:

- Lady Anne Clifford, 14th Baroness de Clifford (1590–1676), helped to shape Appleby by restoring the castle and refurbishing the churches. Her memorial stands beside her mother's in St Lawrence's Church, Boroughgate, where both are buried.
- Thomas Barlow (1607/1608–1691), an English academic and clergyman who became Provost of Queen's College, Oxford and Bishop of Lincoln, was born at nearby Orton and attended Appleby Grammar School.
- Saint John Boste (1544–1594), at nearby Dufton, attended Appleby Grammar school & Queens College Oxford. He is a saint in the Catholic Church and one of the Forty Martyrs of England and Wales.
- Barnabas Simpson (c.1634–1712), clergyman who was the vicar of Appleby St Michael from 1661 to 1712.
- William Stobart (born 1961), director and shareholder of Appleby-based WA Developments Ltd
- Gavin Skelton (born 1981), football coach
- Helen Skelton (born 1983), television presenter, attended Appleby Grammar School.

== See also ==
- Listed buildings in Appleby-in-Westmorland
