= Stainmore (disambiguation) =

Stainmore may refer to:

- Stainmore, a remote geographic area and civil parish in the Pennines near the borders of Cumbria, County Durham and North Yorkshire.
  - North Stainmore, a village in the civil parish of Stainmore, Cumbria
  - South Stainmore, a village in Stainmore, Cumbria
- Stainmore Railway, properly known as the South Durham and Lancashire Union Railway
  - Stainmore Railway Company, an organisation attempting to restore the former Stainmore Railway
  - Stainmore Summit, highest point on the Stainmore Railway
- Battle of Stainmore a battle fought in 954AD in Westmoreland, England
- Brough, Cumbria also known as Brough under Stainmore

== See also ==
- Stanmore
