= List of regionally important geological/geomorphological sites (RIGS) in Cumbria =

This is a list of the Regionally Important Geological / Geomorphological Sites RIGS in Cumbria. LGS sites are designated and archived through an on-going review process. The full current list is hosted by the Cumbria Biodiversity Data Centre.

- Armathwaite Dyke grid reference NY503453
- Banks Gate, North Stainmore NY846147
- Belah Scar, Brough Sowerby NY796121
- Bowderdale SD678988
- Bullman Hills, North Pennines NY694373
- Church Lane, Church Brough NY793139
- Cocklock Scar, Kirkland NY655330
- Coombe Clints, Armathwaite NY505452
- Dufton Ghyll Woods, Appleby NY693245
- Hags Bank, Alston Moor NY766451
- High Cup Nick, Dufton NY746263
- Howhill Quarry, Alston NY729434
- Knock Pike, Flagdaw NY686283
- Lacy's Caves, Little Salkeld NY564383
- Langdale Beck, Howgills NY663015
- Nateby West NY773066
- Scale Beck, Gaythorne Plain, Orton NY646126
- Shap Abbey NY547153
- Smardale Bridge NY726062
- Smardale Gill Limestone Quarry NY724065
- Stenkrith Park, Kirkby Stephen NY773075
- Wild Boar Fell, Mallerstang SD765985
