= Listed buildings in Stainmore =

Stainmore, for administrative purposes, is a civil parish in Westmorland and Furness, Cumbria, England. The parish contains ten listed buildings that are recorded in the National Heritage List for England. All the listed buildings are designated at Grade II, the lowest of the three grades, which is applied to "buildings of national importance and special interest". The parish is almost completely rural, containing only a few small settlements. The listed buildings consist of a farmhouse and outbuildings, a former country house and its coach house, a public house, three boundary stones, and three milestones.

== Buildings ==
Name and location	Photograph	Date	Notes
Rampson Farmhouse and outbuildings 54.51602°N 2.22955°W	—	Mid to late 18th century	The farmhouse incorporates parts of an earlier building and was refurbished in 1995–96. The buildings are in sandstone with quoins and slate roofs. The house has two storeys, a front of three bays and a rear service wing, giving a T-shaped plan. The doorway has pilasters with moulded capitals, a banded lintel, and a pediment, and the windows are sashes. To the right is a range of outbuildings at right angles projecting to the south and ending in a cross-wing. The openings include doorways and an arched cart entrance.
Punchbowl Inn; 54.53071°N 2.26372°W		Late 18th to early 19th century	The public house was later extended. It is in rendered stone with quoins, a band, and a slate roof, the roof of the extension being hipped. There are two storeys, the original part has five bays, and there is a lower extension to the east. The central doorway has Tuscan pilasters and a pediment. The windows are sashes in stone surrounds, and in the extension is a door in a stone surround.
Augill Castle; 54.51942°N 2.30143°W		1841	A country house in Gothic style, later converted into a hotel, it is in stone with a projecting embattled parapet and slate roofs. There are two storeys and a symmetrical front of 13 bays. The central bay forms a gatehouse, it is flanked by slim turrets, and contains a doorway and a window above, both with pointed heads. The outer bays are also flanked by corner turrets. The ground floor windows are transomed, and the windows in the upper floor have pointed heads. At the rear is a square staircase tower.
Coach-house and cloister, Augill Castle; 54.51957°N 2.30189°W	—	1841	The former coach house is in stone with a projecting embattled parapet and a slate roof. There are two storeys and a symmetrical front of nine bays. The central bay forms a tower containing a four-centred entrance arch above which is a window with a pointed arch. At the ends are turrets, and the blocks between contain central doors and flanking windows. From the south end a right-angled single-storey cloister walk joins the coach house to the house; it contains six large pointed openings.
Boundary stone 54.51226°N 2.20455°W		19th century	The stone marks the boundaries of the townships of South Stainmore and Middle Stainmore, and is set against the parapet of a bridge crossing Blackhause Syke. It consists of a stone about 3 feet (0.91 m) high with angled sides and a segmental top. On the sides are inscribed the names of the townships.
Boundary stone 54.47379°N 2.19355°W		19th century	The stone marks the boundaries of the townships of South Stainmore and Kaber. It consists of a stone about 3 feet (0.91 m) high with angled sides and a segmental top. On the sides are inscribed the names of the townships.
Boundary stone 54.57439°N 2.26245°W	—	Mid 19th century	The boundary stone is set against a wall to the north of the B6276 Road. It has a square plan, it is tapered, and is about 2.5 feet (0.76 m) high. On the east face is carved "E45".
Milestone; 54.54287°N 2.28367°W	—	19th century	The milestone is on the east side of the B6276 Road to the southeast of Greena. It consists of a stone about 3 feet (0.91 m) high with a segmental top, and is inscribed with the distances in miles to Brough and to Middleton.
Milestone; 54.55613°N 2.28096°W	—	19th century	The milestone is on the east side of the B6276 Road to the northeast of Swindalehead House. It consists of a stone about 3 feet (0.91 m) high with a segmental top, and is inscribed with the distances in miles to Brough and to Middleton.
Milestone; 54.57011°N 2.27310°W	—	19th century	The milestone is on the east side of the B6276 Road to the north of Deadmangill Bridge. It consists of a stone about 3 feet (0.91 m) high with a segmental top, and is inscribed with the distances in miles to Brough and to Middleton.
