= Bowes Railway =

British preserved standard gauge cable railway system (built 1826)

Pontop & Jarrow Railway
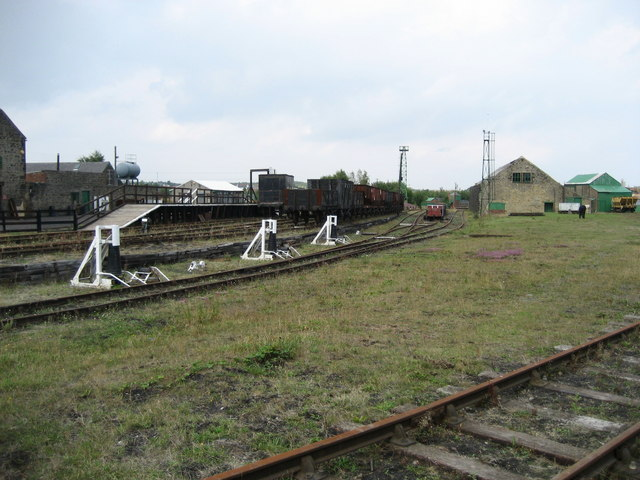
- The Bowes Railway at Springwell Village, City of Sunderland
- Locale: Tyne and Wear
- Terminus: Dipton Colliery to Jarrow Staith (preserved Springwell - Wrekenton)
- Coordinates: 54.9236°N 1.5580°W

Commercial operations
- Built by: Robert Stephenson, designed by George Stephenson
- Original gauge: 4 ft 8 1/2 in (1,435 mm) standard gauge

Preserved operations
- Stations: 2 (Springwell & Blackhams Hill)
- Length: 1 1/2 miles (2.4 km)
- Preserved gauge: 4 ft 8 1/2 in (1,435 mm) standard gauge

Commercial history
- Opened: 1826/1855
- Closed: 1974
- Preserved era: 1975-

The Bowes Railway, built by George Stephenson in 1826, is the world's only operational preserved standard gauge cable railway system. It was built to transport coal from pits in Durham to boats on the River Tyne. The site is a scheduled monument. The railway is open every week on Thursday, Friday and Saturday (Easter til October) as well as on a number of event days throughout the year.

== History ==
=== Background ===
The Grand Allies, a partnership of businessmen including John Bowes, opened a colliery at Springwell in Durham. A railway was needed to transport the coal to the River Tyne. The plan was to build inclined planes and use a combination of steam power and gravity to move the coal wagons. The railway was designed by George Stephenson, who built the Hetton colliery railway completed in 1822.

=== Construction ===
The railway was built between Mount Moor and Jarrow via Springwell village. The first section, between Springwell and Jarrow, opened on 17 January 1826. Mount Moor followed in April 1826. When the line opened it comprised four inclined planes: one steep incline from Mount Moor to Blackham's Hill, and one from Blackham's Hill to Springwell. At Blackham's Hill, the summit of both inclines, was the "hauler house", housing stationary engines to wind the ropes. A long self-acting incline ran from Springwell. Nearly 5 miles (8.0 km) of locomotive-worked line extended to Jarrow where a final incline served the coal staiths. The line was extended across the Team Valley to Kibblesworth Colliery in May 1842. The railway was completed in 1854 when a link from Marley Hill to Kibblesworth was connected enabling collieries in Dipton to be accessed.

=== Operation ===
From 1 January 1947, the railway was owned and operated by the National Coal Board. After 1974 no inclines remained working and the line was only worked north east of Wardley. The last day the inclines were used, Friday 4 October 1974, was filmed by BBC and Tyne-Tees TV crews.

What was left of the Bowes Railway north east of the inclines was served by a shed at Wardley. The line was reduced in length, until at the end there was only about 1 mile (1.6 km) in use. This last section closed on 10 January 1986, a few days short of the 180th anniversary. This attenuated system the NCB called the Monkton Railways, after the coke works that was its mainstay between 1975 and 1986.

== Preserved railway ==
Tyne & Wear Industrial Monuments Trust was established April 1975 and took control of the line around Springwell from the National Coal Board through the medium of county council direction. By 1975 Springwell Workshops were building replica locomotives such as Locomotion No. 1 trading as Locomotion Enterprises.

The preserved Bowes railway, includes Springwell Colliery workshops, a one mile passenger railway and a further mile of rope hauled inclines. Visitors can visit the Victorian workshops and see engineering and blacksmithing demonstrations. A tour of the railway buildings, see the railway's wagon fleet as well as visit the small museum, cafe and shop can all be done at Springwell.

In the future the railway wishes to restart passenger rides and rope haulage demonstrations for the benefit of the public.

=== Rope haulage ===
==== Original system ====
When the Bowes Railway was in full operation the line employed eight rope-worked inclined planes. Two of these (the Springwell and Birkheads inclines) were operated on the self-acting principle; the weight of descending full wagons hauled up the empty wagons via a rope running around a return wheel at the top of the hill. On the remaining six inclines (the Kibblesworth, Black Fell, Blackhams Hill East and West, Starrs and Allerdene Inclines), the ropes were driven by a stationary steam or later electric haulage engine located at the incline top. This type of railway operation pre-dates modern locomotive-type operations, and was laid down here by George Stephenson in 1826. The line's gradual closure eventually left only four inclines in use, these finally closing on 4 October 1974.

==== Preserved system ====
The line, as preserved post-1974, includes two rope-worked inclines. These are the Blackhams Hill East and West inclines. Both are worked by the Blackhams Hill engine, a 300 h.p. Metropolitan Vickers engine commissioned on 30 July 1950. This engine works both the East or Flatt Incline (1,170 yards at a gradient of 1 in 70) and the West or Short Bank (750 yards at a gradient 1 in 13). Over these inclines, the preserved railway demonstrates one of the oldest and most unusual types of railway operation. It is now the only place in Britain where this can be seen. The inclines are not currently operational, however, due to vandalism and decline.

=== Locomotives and brake vans ===
==== Steam locomotives ====
- Andrew Barclay 0-4-0ST W.S.T. Makers Number 2361, built in 1954. Awaiting overhaul; requires new steam pipe and boiler certification. Formerly used at Long Meg Mine and at Cocklakes. British Gypsum signed ownership of the locomotive over to the Bowes Railway Company in September 2008.
- Andrew Barclay 0-4-0ST No 22 (Number 6 Area B Group 85). Makers number 2274, built in 1949, for use on the Bowes Railway. One of the first locomotives on the Bowes Railway in preservation alongside planet. Currently awaiting overhaul and boiler certification.

==== Diesel locomotives ====
- Planet 0-4-0 No 101. The first locomotive to be used regularly on shunting duties and freight trains when the railway entered preservation. Currently in use.
- Hunslet Engine Company 0-4-0 No 6263. Used on freight trains and shunting; the most powerful shunter on the line. Currently out of use needing new brake blocks and a minor overhaul.
- Ruston & Hornsby Class 88 0-4-0 No 476140 "Redheugh". Restored for use on both passenger and demonstration coal trains. Originally used at Redhaugh gas works.
- Ruston & Hornsby Class 165 0-4-0 locos "Pinky" (1953) and "Perky" (1954), donated by the Port of Sunderland. They were some of the last operating industrial locomotives in County Durham. Perky is currently operational, Pinky under overhaul.

==== Passenger stock ====
- Lambton Hetton & Joicey Collieries Brake van No 1. In use.
- L.M.S. No 2, built for use in Derby. In use.
- L.M.S. No 3 Brake van. Awaiting repairs.
- B24 - The Queen Mother's wagon. Awaiting repairs and fitting of handrails.

Wagons

The railway also has a fleet of 45 original Bowes Railway wagons dating from 1887 through to 1963, as well as seven similar wagons from other industrial sites in the North East.

== Bibliography ==
- Mountford, Colin Edwin (1966). The Bowes Railway. Birmingham Locomotive Club.
- Mountford, Colin Edwin (1976). The Bowes Railway. London: Industrial Railway Society and the Tyne & Wear Industrial Monuments Trust.
- Mountford, Colin Edwin (2013). Rope & Chain Haulage. Industrial Railway Society. ISBN 978-1-901556-84-1.
- Mountford, Colin Edwin (2004). The Private Railways of County Durham. Industrial Railway Society. pp. 26ff. ISBN 1-901556-29-8.
- Elliot, John (2000). A Guide to the Bowes Railway 175 Years of Railway History. Houghton Le Spring: Chilton Iron Works. p. 32. ISBN 0952367262.
- Bowes Line, in The Tyne Documentaries, DVD published by Amber Films, Newcastle upon Tyne.
