= Little Salkeld rail accident =

1918 railway accident in England

Details
- Date: 19 January 1918; 15:58
- Location: Long Meg cutting near Little Salkeld
- Coordinates: 54.724°N 2.6798°W
- Country: England
- Line: Settle-Carlisle Line
- Operator: Midland Railway
- Cause: Line obstructed (landslip)

Statistics
- Trains: 1
- Deaths: 7
- Injured: 46

The Little Salkeld rail accident occurred on 19 January 1918 in Long Meg cutting, between Little Salkeld and Lazonby railway stations (about 15 miles (24 km) south of Carlisle on the Settle-Carlisle Line).

As the 11 carriage 08:50 London St Pancras to Glasgow St Enoch express approached the cutting, a heavy landslip caused by a sudden thaw blocked both tracks ahead of the train. Just five minutes earlier a platelayer had walked past the spot and seen nothing amiss. The engine, a Midland Railway 1000 Class No. 1010, ploughed into the mass of clay at a speed of 50–60 mph (80–100 km/h), telescoping the front two carriages.

6 passengers were killed immediately and another fatally injured, whilst 37 passengers and 9 railway staff received non-fatal injuries. The more seriously injured were taken either to the Cumberland Infirmary or Fusehill Military Hospital, both in Carlisle.
