= Holland Road =

Holland Road may refer to:

- Holland Road, London, United Kingdom
- Holland Road, Singapore, Singapore
- "Holland Road", a song by Mumford & Sons from their 2012 album Babel
