= Swindale Beck (Brough) =

River in Cumbria, England

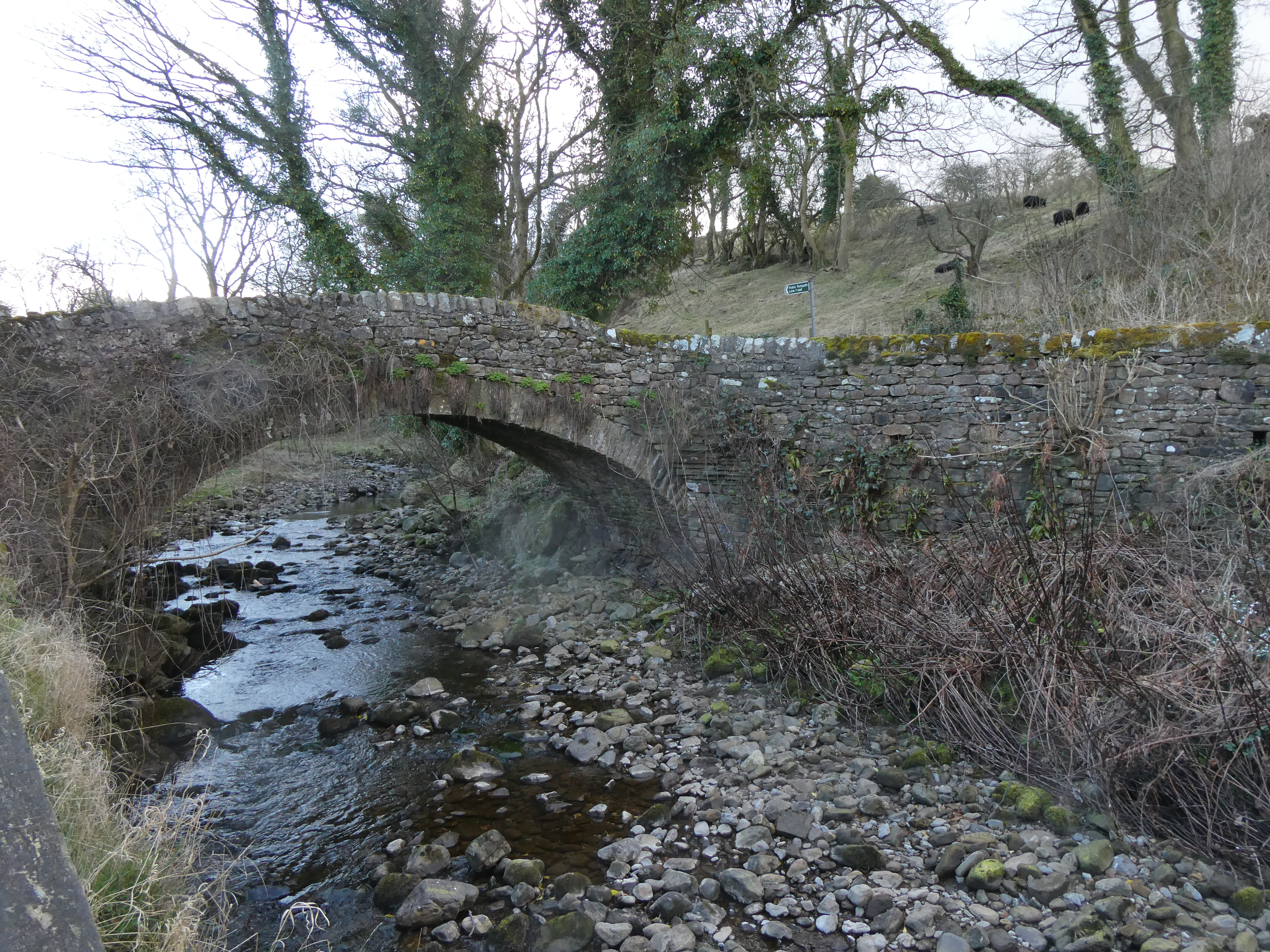
Grade II listed bridge over Swindale Beck to south of Mill House, Brough

Swindale Beck is a river in Cumbria, England, near Appleby-in-Westmorland, which for much of its length forms the boundary between the civil parishes of Helbeck to the west and Stainmore to the east, in the Westmorland and Furness unitary authority area. It is formed at Swindale Head, about 400 m (440 yd) west of the B6276 road from Brough to Middleton-in-Teesdale, at the confluence of Tarn Gill and Coalgill Syke, and flows through Brough and into the River Eden at Great Musgrave.

At Brough, it is crossed by a grade II listed Bridge.
