= Little Salkeld railway station =

Former railway station in Cumbria, England

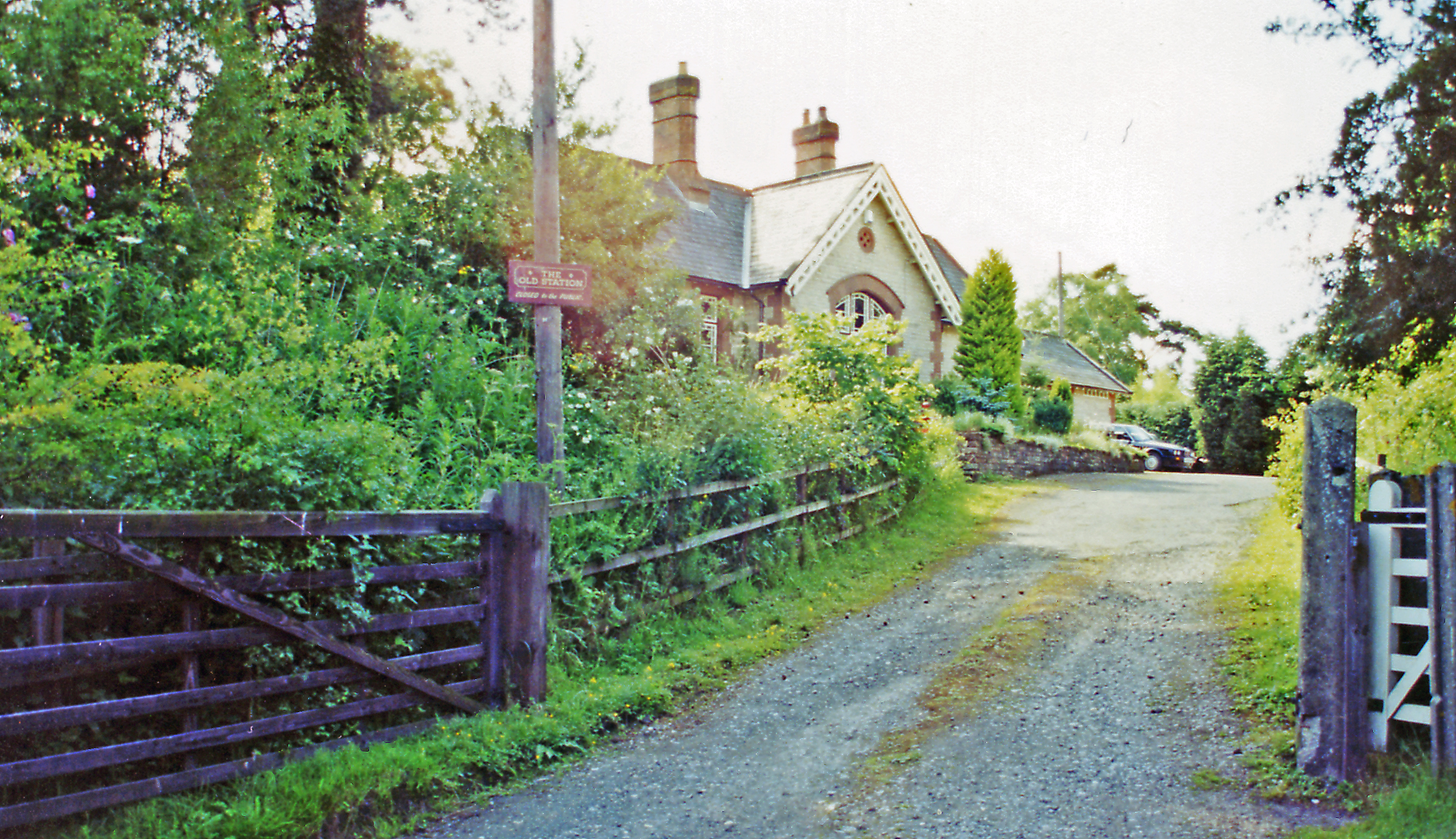
- Former station approach

General information
- Location: Westmorland and Furness; England
- Coordinates: 54.712824°N 2.676877°W
- Grid reference: NY5648935522
- Platforms: 2

Other information
- Status: Disused

History
- Original company: Midland Railway
- Post-grouping: London Midland and Scottish Railway

Key dates
- 1 May 1876: Opened
- 4 May 1970: Station closed
Location

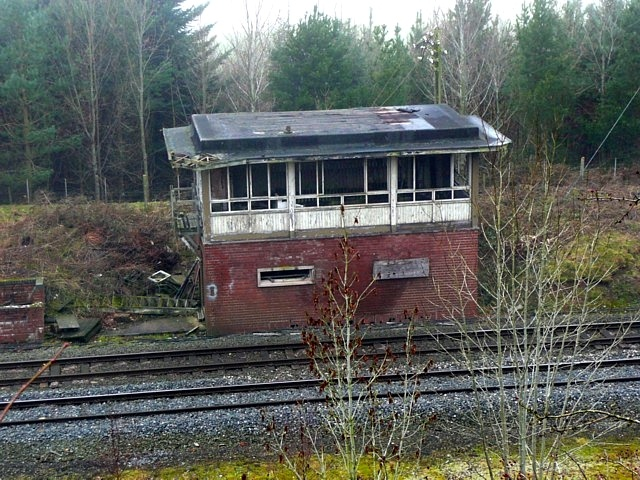
Long Meg signal box

Little Salkeld was a railway station which served the village of Little Salkeld in Hunsonby parish and Great Salkeld, Cumbria, England. The Settle-Carlisle Line remains operational for freight and passenger traffic. The station was built by the Midland Railway and opened in 1876. It closed in 1970, when the local stopping service over the line was withdrawn by British Rail.

== History ==
The station and branch line to the Long Meg Mine were both closed in the 1970s, although the disused platforms still remain and the station building is well maintained as a private house. In 1918 a train accident in nearby Long Meg Cutting killed seven people. A further accident at the station in 1933 (a collision between a shunting goods train and a southbound passenger express due irregular block working by the resident porter-signalman) led to the death of one railwayman and injuries to a further thirty passengers and five members of railway staff. Railway workers cottages were also located here.

Little Salkeld or Dodds Mill viaduct lies near to the mill and just north of the village is the Eden Lacy or Long Meg Viaduct across the River Eden.

South of Eden Lacy viaduct and north of Little Salkeld station was Long Meg Sidings signal box. A British Railways London Midland Region Type 15 design fitted with a 40 lever London Midland Region Standard frame, it opened on 3 July 1955 replacing Long Meg Sidings Ground Frame which only connected with the Up line. A Midland Railway signal box had been at this location until 13 March 1915. The signal box was officially closed on 11 July 1990 (although it had been permanently "switched out" for several years prior to this) when the absolute block section was extended to between Culgaith and Low House Crossing signal boxes.

=== Stationmasters ===
- G. White 1876 - 1877
- G. Wooding 1877 - 1880
- W.G. Mitchell 1880 - 1883
- G. Barker 1883 - 1886
- H. Cress 1886 - 1891
- Thomas Smith 1891 - ca. 1914
- Robert James Tinsley from 1959 (also station master at Langwathby)

=== Long Meg mine ===
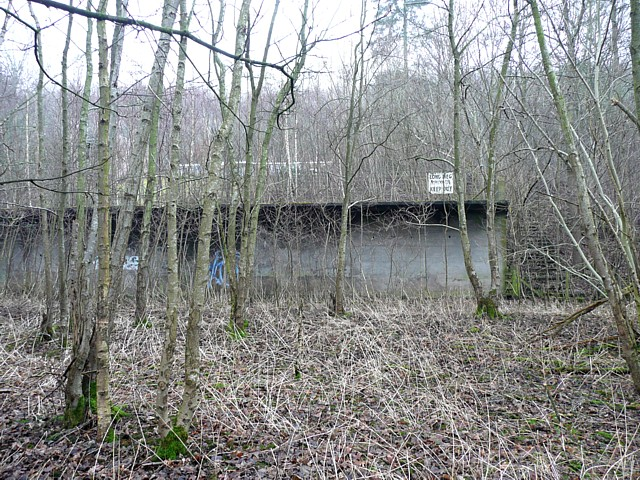
Ruins at Long Meg Mine site.

in 1885 Long Meg Drift mine was opened by the Long Meg Plaster Company Limited, and the drift mine was connected to the Midland Railway in 1886.

The Carlisle Plaster and Cement Company Limited closed the mine in 1914–5, but in 1922 the mine was reopened for the extraction of anhydrite by the Long Meg Plaster and Mineral Company Limited. The mine was purchased in 1939 by the British Plaster Board Limited, renamed British Gypsum, who closed the mine in January 1976.

Preceding station	Historical railways	Following station
Langwathby	Midland Railway; Settle-Carlisle Railway	Lazonby and Kirkoswald
