= Listed buildings in Brough, Cumbria =

Brough is a civil parish in Westmorland and Furness, Cumbria, England. It contains 39 buildings that are recorded in the National Heritage List for England. Of these, one is listed at Grade II*, the middle of the three grades, and the others are at Grade II, the lowest grade. The parish contains the village of Brough, at the junction of the A66 and the A685 roads, and the surrounding countryside. Most of the listed buildings are shops and houses with associated structures in the village. The other listed buildings include a church, a memorial in the churchyard, three cross bases, a hotel, a farmhouse, three boundary stones, three mileposts, a clock tower, and a bridge.

== Key ==
Grade	Criteria
II*	Particularly important buildings of more than special interest
II	Buildings of national importance and special interest

== Buildings ==
Name and location	Photograph	Date	Notes	Grade
St Michael's Church; 54.52017°N 2.32108°W		12th century	The tower was added in 1513. The church is built in sandstone with stepped buttresses and a lead roof. It consists of a nave, a north aisle, a chancel on a chamfered plinth and a three-stage west tower. The south doorway is Norman, and the windows are straight-headed, dating from the 14th century and later.	II*
Cross base, The Square; 54.52137°N 2.31965°W		Medieval (possible)	The cross base is in The Square, and consists of five steps of sandstone blocks, which has supported a maypole.	II
Cross base, St Michael's Church; 54.52005°N 2.32086°W	—	Medieval (probable)	The cross base is in the churchyard, and has a square plan. It consists of a block with chamfered edges, on a low step. On the base is the stump of an octagonal shaft with chamfered edges, which is surmounted by a brass sundial plate without a gnomon.	II
Former market cross 54.52586°N 2.31551°W		1331	The oldest part is the base, a rectangular block with a socket and chamfered edges. The shaft dates from the 18th century, it is about 4 feet (1.2 m) high, with chamfered corners and a conical finial. There are two steps leading up to the base dating from the 19th century.	II
Highfields; 54.52595°N 2.31491°W	—	17th century	A stone house on a boulder plinth, with quoins and a stone-flagged roof. There are two storeys, a central doorway in an architrave, and sash windows.	II
Wiend House and store 54.52121°N 2.32093°W	—	17th century	The building is in stone with quoins. The roof at the front is in Welsh slate, and at the rear it is stone-flagged. There are two storeys. The main part has a central doorway and sash windows. The single bay to the left has, in addition to sash windows, the remains of mullioned windows.	II
Harglade; 54.52584°N 2.31590°W	—	1719	A stone house with quoins and a Welsh slate roof. There are two storeys and four bays. In the left bay is a two-storey bay window, the doorway has an architrave and a dated lintel, and the windows are sashes in architraves.	II
Bridge over Swindale Beck; 54.52723°N 2.31556°W		18th century (probable)	The bridge carries a former mill road over Swindale Beck. It consists of a single segmental arch with a span of about 15 feet (4.6 m). The parapets have splayed ends and triangular copings. The roadway is 8 feet (2.4 m) wide, it is cobbled, and is partly covered in tarmac.	II
Field Head Farmhouse and threshing barn 54.50513°N 2.28278°W	—	18th century	The farmhouse has a core possibly dating from the 15th or 16th century. The buildings are in stone with stone-flagged roofs. The house has two storeys and an outshut. The doorway is in the outshut, it is chamfered, and most of the windows are 20th-century casements. At the southeast corner are the remains of an earlier building, including a stair tower. The barn is at the west end at right angles, and it has quoins.	II
Hazel Bank Cottage; 54.52590°N 2.31790°W	—	18th century	A stone house with quoins and a stone-flagged roof. There are two storeys, three bays, and a central doorway. The window to the right of the doorway is a casement, and the others are sashes.	II
House adjoining Castle Hotel; 54.52642°N 2.31795°W	—	18th century (probable)	The house is pebbledashed on a plinth, and has stone-flagged eaves and a slate roof. There are two storeys and a symmetrical three-bay front. In the centre is a doorway with a cornice, flanked by canted bay windows. In the upper floor there are two sash windows.	II
One-Stop Shop; 54.52647°N 2.31871°W		18th century	A stone shop that has a slate roof with stone copings. There are three storeys and three bays. In the ground floor is a 20th-century shop front, and above are sash windows in stone surrounds, and a re-set datestone.	II
Bank House; 54.52591°N 2.31655°W	—	1769	A stuccoed house on a plinth that has a slate roof with stone coping. There are three storeys and three bays. In the centre is a doorway, and there are two sash windows in each floor.	II
Glaslyn House; 54.52593°N 2.31669°W	—	1769	A stuccoed house on a plinth, with a corner pilaster and a slate roof with stone coping. There are three storeys and three bays. In the left bay is a doorway with pilasters and a pediment containing initials and the date. The windows are sashes, and all the openings have stone surrounds.	II
Building between One-stop shop and Post Office; 54.52651°N 2.31887°W	—	Late 18th century	The building is pebbledashed with quoins, and has three storeys and four bays. To the left is an entrance, to the right is a former shop window, and in the upper floors are sash windows.	II
Castle Hotel and Inn; 54.52640°N 2.31775°W		Late 18th century	The hotel is in stone on a plinth, with quoins and a cornice, and it has a slate roof with stone copings. There are three storeys and a symmetrical front of five bays. In the centre is a porch carried on Tuscan columns, and the windows are sashes. At the rear is a two-storey wing. To the right is the inn, with two storeys, two bays, and a canted bay window.	II
House adjoining Hazel Bank Cottage; 54.52588°N 2.31792°W	—	Late 18th century	The house, which was originally a shop, is in stone with quoins and a stone-flagged roof. There are two storeys and two bays. In the ground floor, to the left is a doorway, to the right is a former shop window, and in the upper floor are two sash windows.	II
1 Grove Cottages; 54.52596°N 2.31687°W	—	Late 18th to early 19th century	A pebbledashed cottage on a plinth, with a slate roof hipped to the right. It has two storeys and two bays. On the right is a doorway with a stone surround, and there is a sash window in each floor.	II
2 Grove Cottages; 54.52596°N 2.31681°W	—	Late 18th to early 19th century	A pebbledashed cottage on a plinth with a slate roof, two storeys, and three bays. On the right is a passage door, in the centre is a doorway, and there is a sash window to the left, and two sashes in the upper floor. All the openings have stone surrounds.	II
Augill House and former coach house 54.52757°N 2.28828°W	—	Late 18th to early 19th century	The house has been extended to incorporate a former coach house. It is in stone on a plinth, and has quoins, a band, a moulded eaves cornice, and a stone-flagged roof. There are two storeys, a symmetrical front of three bays, and an outshut at the rear. The central doorway has a semicircular fanlight with a projecting keystone and impost blocks. The windows are sashes in stone surrounds.	II
Foregate wall, railings and gate. Augill House; 54.52740°N 2.28841°W	—	Late 18th to early 19th century	The low stone wall in front of the garden has chamfered copings, and carries wrought iron railings that have a corkscrew twist at the tops of the standards. In the centre is a wrought iron gate with similar standards and scrolled decoration.	II
Bridge House; 54.52213°N 2.31980°W	—	Late 18th to early 19th century	A stone house with rusticated quoins and a stone-flagged roof. There are two storeys and a symmetrical front of three bays. In the centre is a doorway with a semicircular head, moulded impost blocks, and a projecting keystone. The windows are sashes in stone surrounds.	II
House to east of Hill View; 54.52611°N 2.31439°W	—	Late 18th to early 19th century	A stone house on a plinth with quoins and a stone-flagged roof. There are two storeys and three bays. In the ground floor, to the left, is a passage entry, in the middle is a doorway in a stone surround, and to the right is a sash window, and in the upper floor are two sash windows.	II
House to west of Hill View; 54.52606°N 2.31462°W	—	Late 18th to early 19th century	A stuccoed house with rusticated quoins, a band, and a slate roof. It has two storeys, a symmetrical front of three bays, a central doorway with a rusticated surround, and sash windows in stone surrounds.	II
Former Post Office; 54.52657°N 2.31904°W	—	Late 18th to early 19th century	A pebbledashed shop with rusticated quoins to the right and a Welsh slate roof. It has two storeys and four bays. In the ground floor is a shop front, and an elliptical-headed entrance leading to Swan Avenue on the left. In the upper floor are sash windows.	II
House to left of Rose Cottages, barn and byre 54.52556°N 2.31717°W	—	Late 18th to early 19th century	The house and outbuildings are in stone with a stone-flagged roof. The house is pebbledashed with two storeys and three bays. In the ground floor is a gabled porch, a window with a semicircular head, and a casement window, and in the upper floor are three sash windows. To the north is a barn with quoins, a wagon entrance with a segmental head, and dove holes.	II
House adjoining former shop 54.52584°N 2.31795°W	—	Late 18th to early 19th century	A stone house with quoins and a stone-flagged roof. There are two storeys, two bays, and an outshut. The door is to the left, and to the right is a sash window in each floor.	II
Walton tomb and enclosure 54.52012°N 2.32075°W		1807	The tomb is in the churchyard of St Michael's Church, and is built in sandstone. On the sides are pilasters with urns in low relief, and elaborately carved panels. The tomb has a hipped top with inscriptions giving details of members of the Walton family. The tomb is in an enclosure with railings that have corner posts with urn finials.	II
Boundary stone 54.53749°N 2.29500°W	—	19th century	The stone is about 3 feet (0.91 m) high, and has angled sides and a segmental top. It is inscribed with the names of the two townships.	II
Boundary stone 54.52352°N 2.31942°W	—	19th century	The stone is about 3 feet (0.91 m) high, and has angled sides and a segmental top. It is inscribed with the names of the two townships.	II
Boundary stone 54.52916°N 2.33130°W	—	19th century	The stone is about 3 feet (0.91 m) high, and has angled sides and a segmental top. It is inscribed with the names of the two townships.	II
Boundary stone 54.51789°N 2.30618°W	—	Mid 19th century	The boundary stone was moved to its present site in the late 20th century. It has a square plan and is about 3 feet (0.91 m) high, carved on the east face with "13".	II
Burneside House; 54.52622°N 2.31792°W	—	Mid 19th century (probable)	A stone house with a slate roof on a corner site. It is in a polygonal plan, and has two storeys. There is a doorway with a casement window to the left, and the other windows are sash windows.	II
Grove House; 54.52595°N 2.31700°W	—	Mid 19th century	A stuccoed house on a plinth with corner pilasters, a band, a low moulded parapet, and a hipped slate roof. On the left is a two-storey canted bay window. To the right is a doorway with a small sash window above, both in stone surrounds.	II
Milestone; 54.52737°N 2.28822°W	—	19th century	The milestone is about 2 feet (0.61 m) high with a segmental top and chamfered edges. It is inscribed with the distances in miles to Bowes and to Brough.	II
Milestone; 54.52678°N 2.31230°W	—	19th century	The milestone has an elliptical top and chamfered edges. It is inscribed with the distances in miles to Bowes and to London.	II
Milestone; 54.53485°N 2.30111°W	—	19th century	The milestone has a segmental top and chamfered edges. It is inscribed with the distances in miles to Brough and to Middleton.	II
Oddfellows Hall; 54.52633°N 2.31869°W		1878	The hall is stuccoed with a slate roof, and has two storeys and a symmetrical front of three bays. The central doorway has a fanlight in a rusticated surround with a pointed head. Above the doorway is a dated trefoil panel. The door is flanked by one window on each side, also with rusticated surrounds and pointed heads.	II
Clock Tower; 54.52635°N 2.31821°W		1911	The clock tower commemorates the coronation of King George V. It is in sandstone, with a square plan, and has two stages. On each side of the lower stage is a blind arch, and on each side of the upper stage is a clock face with a louvred opening above. The tower is surmounted by a tapering column with an impost block and a pointed finial.	II
