= Salkeld Hall =

Country house in Hunsonby, Cumbria, England

Coordinates: 54.7182°N 2.6766°W

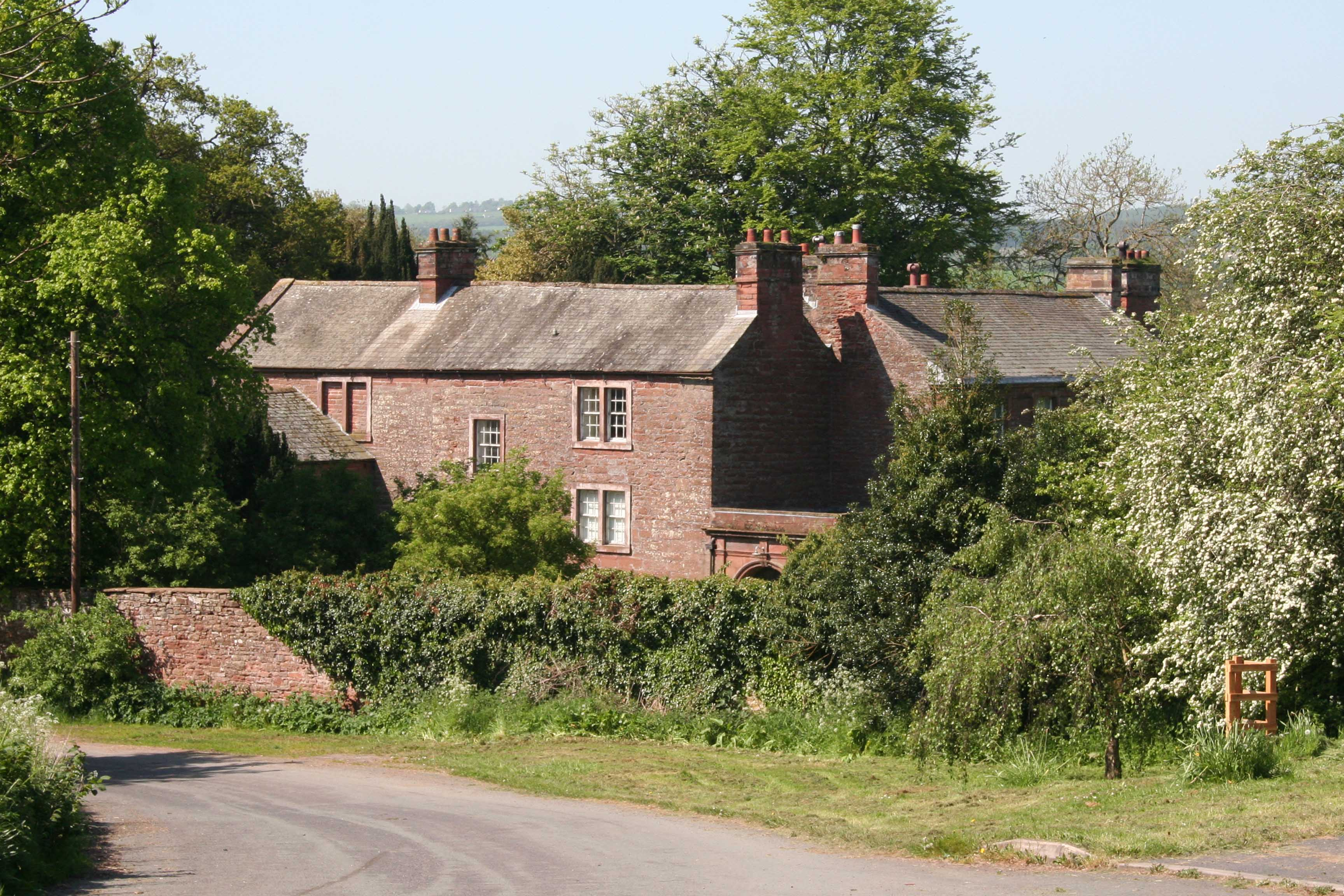
Salkeld Hall

Salkeld Hall is a red sandstone Grade II* listed country house in the village of Little Salkeld, Cumbria, England and is the original residence of the Salkeld family.

== History ==
The current house was constructed in the late 16th century using walls from previous building(s) that stood on the site. The oldest part of the building was dated in 1967 as being from the 14th century. The date of the first building to exist on the site is unknown; it is the potential location of an 'ancient castle'.

Corby Castle in nearby Great Corby, built from similar materials in the 14th century, was also owned by the Salkeld Family. Mr George Salkeld, the last member of which to own Salkeld Hall, was forced from the house at the time of the English Civil War for a 'trifling consideration'. Ownership was passed to Colonel Cholmley, who built a new house on the site, and before the year of 1688 it became the property of Mr Charles Smallwood. His descendant, Timothy Smallwood, Esq. sold the house to Colonel Samuel Lacy in 1790.

During his occupation of the house Lacy's servant (a deserted batman) was (under instruction) responsible for the carving of Lacy's Caves and allegedly attempting to blow up the stones at the nearby Long Meg and Her Daughters stone circle with gunpowder so that the field could be ploughed. The latter is unconfirmed and according to some sources took place in 1725 before Lacy was alive. Local folklore tells that when work commenced a tremendous storm broke out overhead that caused the workmen to flee the site and abandon the work permanently. The stones seem to show no sign of such an explosion.

Colonel Lacy sold the house in 1836 to Robert Hodgson, Esq. Ownership between this and the current is unknown, however in 1847 Robert Hodgson was still the reported owner and had made great improvements to the house, offices and gardens.

In 1967 the house was recorded as having been divided into a number of holiday flats.

== Present condition ==
The house is currently privately owned with no public rights of way across the land. The main part of the house is intact and occupied by the owner. What were holiday flats are now rented on a contract basis, and little modernisation has taken place since the 1960s. A number of outbuildings to the south-east of the property, which at one time would have been self-contained two-storey houses, are now in ruins.

== See also ==
- Grade II* listed buildings in Westmorland and Furness
- Listed buildings in Hunsonby
