= Listed buildings in Helbeck =

Helbeck is a civil parish in Westmorland and Furness, Cumbria, England. It contains three listed buildings that are recorded in the National Heritage List for England. Of these, one is listed at Grade II*, the middle of the three grades, and the others are at Grade II, the lowest grade. The listed buildings comprise a country house, an associated coach house, and an observation tower.

== Key ==
| Grade | Criteria |
|---|---|
| II* | Particularly important buildings of more than special interest |
| II | Buildings of national importance and special interest |

== Buildings ==
| Name and location | Photograph | Date | Notes | Grade |
|---|---|---|---|---|
| Helbeck Hall; 54.53679°N 2.32283°W | | 1776 | A country house in pebbledashed stone on a chamfered plinth, with rusticated quoins, moulded eaves, a parapet with urns, and a hipped slate roof. There are two storeys, and a symmetrical front of seven bays, the outer bays being lower and recessed. In the centre is a French window with a traceried fanlight. The windows are sashes that have ogee-headed architraves with finials. There is a 19th-century single-storey billiard room at the northeast corner. In the roof are three ogee-headed dormers, and at the rear is a retaining wall about 15 feet (4.6 m) high. | II* |
| Coach house, Helbeck Hall; 54.53694°N 2.32342°W | — | 1776 | The coach house is in stone with rusticated quoins, moulded eaves, and a hipped slate roof. There are two storeys and six bays. Above the central two bays is a pediment containing a quatrefoil window. The coach house contains a segment-headed entrance converted into a window, and the other windows are sashes in stone surrounds. | II |
| Fox Tower; 54.54126°N 2.33087°W | | c. 1779 | Built as an observation tower, but now without a roof or floors, it is in stone with some brick. The tower is circular, tapering, and with two storeys. There is an entrance in the ground floor, and five windows in the upper floor with semicircular heads. Adjacent to the main tower is a smaller tower containing a staircase, and the whole stands on a large semicircular drum plinth. | II |
