= Listed buildings in Hunsonby =

Hunsonby is a civil parish in Westmorland and Furness, Cumbria, England. It contains eight listed buildings that are recorded in the National Heritage List for England. Of these, two are listed at Grade II*, the middle of the three grades, and the others are at Grade II, the lowest grade. The parish contains the villages of Hunsonby, Little Salkeld and Winskill, and the surrounding countryside. The listed buildings comprise houses and associated structure, farmhouses, farm buildings, and a working water mill.

== Key ==
Grade	Criteria
II*	Particularly important buildings of more than special interest
II	Buildings of national importance and special interest

== Buildings ==
Name and location	Photograph	Date	Notes	Grade
Salkeld Hall; 54.71820°N 2.67664°W		Late 16th century	A country house, incorporating earlier material, it was extended in the 17th century, a Georgian front was added in about 1790, and there were further additions in 1836 and in the 1870s. The house is in sandstone with quoins and green slate roofs. The Georgian front is on a chamfered plinth, it has a cornice, two storeys, five bays, and flanking single-storey two-bay wings. Elsewhere parts of the house have three storeys. In the older part the windows are mullioned, some with transoms, and with hood moulds, and there is one medieval window. Elsewhere most windows are sashes. and there are also Venetian windows and round-headed windows. At the rear is a projecting 19th-century two-storey battlemented porch.	II*
Rowan Cottage; 54.71388°N 2.65163°W	—	Late 17th century	A sandstone house with quoins, a moulded eaves cornice, and a corrugated iron roof. There are two storeys, three bays, and a rear outshut. The doorway has a stone surround, and the windows are mullioned.	II
Wy House and barn 54.70777°N 2.65467°W	—	Late 17th century	The farmhouse and barn are in sandstone, partly rendered, and have a corrugated iron roof with coped gables. The house has two storeys and three bays, with a single-bay barn to the left, and a rear outshut. The doorway has a sandstone surround. Most of the windows are sashes with sandstone surrounds, and there are also small casement windows in original surrounds. The barn has a blank front wall.	II
South View and barn 54.71368°N 2.65258°W	—	Early 18th century	A farmhouse and barn in sandstone with green slate roofs. There are two storeys, the farmhouse has two bays, a single-bay former dairy to the right has been incorporated into the house, and to the right of that is a two-bay barn. The doorway in the house has a stone surround, and the windows are sashes with sandstone surrounds. The barn has a door and a casement window, and at the rear is a mullioned window.	II
Watermill, house, barn and stables 54.71695°N 2.67408°W		c. 1750	A working water mill with attached miller's house, barn and stable that were restored in 1975. They are in rendered sandstone, the house has a roof of sandstone slate, the roof of the mill is in green slate and that of the stables is of Welsh slate. The house has two storeys, two bays, and sash windows, the mill to the left has three storeys, two bays, and casement windows, and to the right the barn has two bays and a segmental headed entrance, and the stable has three bays, sash windows and a loft door. At the rear are two overshot waterwheels driving machinery, much of which is original.	II*
Garden wall with bee boles, South View; 54.71354°N 2.65255°W	—	Late 18th or early 19th century	The wall encloses the garden to the front of the house. It is in sandstone on a square plinth, and has flat coping. On the west side it is high, and it contains three recesses with stone surrounds for bee boles, it then steps down and turns to form the lower south wall.	II
Coach house and stables, Salkeld Hall; 54.71809°N 2.67623°W	—	1836 (probable)	The coach house and stables have been converted for other uses. They are in sandstone with quoins and a green slate roof. In the centre is a 2 1/2-storey pedimented archway, with a three-bay coach house to the left, and four-bay former stables to the right. The coach house has a round-headed carriage arch, the stables have doorways, and both have sash windows.	II
Little Salkeld Viaduct; 54.71031°N 2.67454°W		1875	The viaduct was built by the Midland Railway for the Settle-Carlisle line, to carry the railway over the valley of Briggle Beck. It is in sandstone with brick soffits to the arches, and it has seven spans of 45 feet (14 m). The viaduct is carried on tapering piers, and has imposts, a continuous band, and a solid parapet.	II
