= John Indermaur =

British solicitor

John Indermaur (24 November 1851 – 19 July 1925) was a British lawyer and legal writer, with his writing focus was on common law. He is known for having written An Epitome of Leading Common Law Cases in 1875, Principles of Common Law in 1876, and The Student's Guide to Trusts and Partnerships in 1885.

Indermaur qualified as a solicitor in 1874. He and his law partner, Charles Thwaites, had a law firm on Chancery Lane in the City of London and began teaching and writing about law together in 1884. Other legal works written by Indermaur include A Manual of the Principals of Equity, The Student's Guide to Procedure and Evidence, and Principals and Practice in Matters Appertaining to Conveyancing.

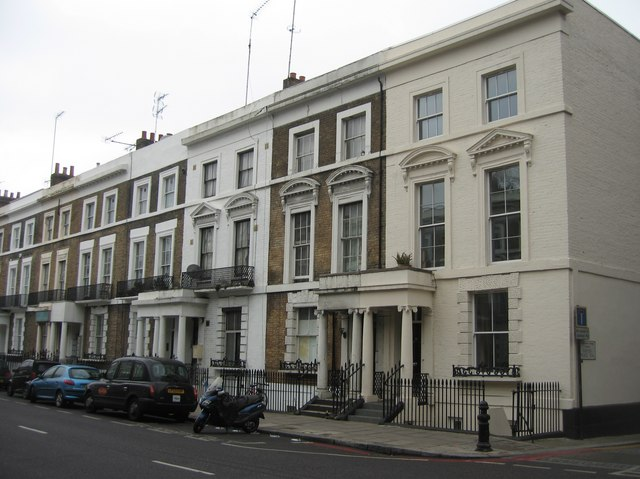
Holland Road, where Indermaur lived

He was born on 24 November 1851 in Lyncombe, Bath to John George Indermaur and Mary Staple. His father's family, the In der Maur, descended from Switzerland. He was married to Jessie Margaret Dickson. Indermaur lived in a large town house on Holland Road in London. In 1888, he owned Augill Castle. In 1904, he was listed in the Royal Blue Book: Court and Parliamentary Guide. He died on 19 July 1925 in Camberwell House in Surrey, England.
