= Rey Cross =

Coordinates: 54.50579°N 2.14867°W

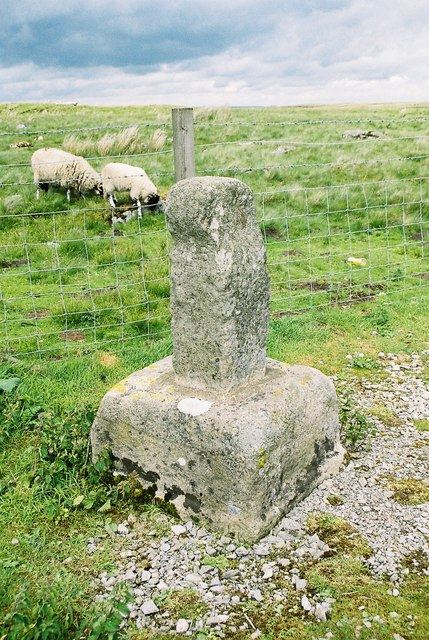
Rey Cross

Rey Cross is the remains of a stone cross at Stainmore. It is also known as Rere Cross and is a Grade II* listed structure and a scheduled monument. It is located towards the western edge of County Durham, approximately 1 kilometre (0.62 mi) east of the border with Cumbria along the A66 road.

== Purpose ==
Believed to have been ten feet tall, a long-held local legend states it was the burial place of Eric Bloodaxe, Viking Ruler of Northumbria. However, Norman Davies posits that it was a "boundary stone . . . halfway between Penrith and Barnard Castle."

== Recent history ==
In the late 1980s the widening of route A66 was planned through Stainmore. In 1990 the cross was lifted from its then position to the south of the road within the Rey Cross Roman Marching Camp and an excavation of the ground underneath was performed. No bones were found at the site, although it remains possible that Eric's burial might be elsewhere on the Stainmore moors. During the road widening works the cross was moved to the Bowes Museum for safekeeping. After completion of the road works in 1992 the monument was re-sited to its current position which is easily accessible from a layby in the road.

== See also ==
- Market cross
