= Helbeck =

Civil parish in Cumbria, England

Coordinates: 54.535°N 2.318°W

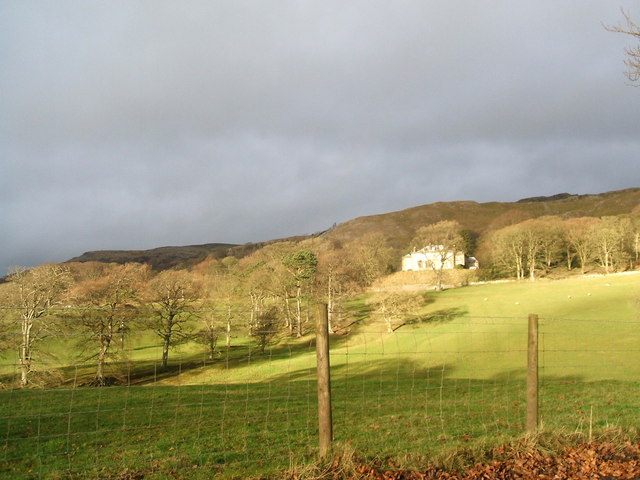
- Helbeck Hall

- Location in Eden, Cumbria Location within Cumbria
- Population: 19 (2001)
- OS grid reference: NY7911
- Civil parish: Helbeck
- Unitary authority: Westmorland and Furness
- Ceremonial county: Cumbria
- Region: North West
- Country: England
- Sovereign state: United Kingdom
- Post town: KIRKBY STEPHEN
- Postcode district: CA17
- Dialling code: 01768
- Police: Cumbria
- Fire: Cumbria
- Ambulance: North West
- UK Parliament: Westmorland and Lonsdale

Helbeck is a settlement and civil parish near the village of Brough, in Westmorland and Furness, in the county of Cumbria, England. There is a wood called Helbeck Wood nearby. In 2001 the parish had a population of 19, the population taken at the 2011 Census was only minimal and is included in the parish of Brough.

== History ==
The name "Hillbeck" means 'Cave stream'. Hillbeck was formerly a township in the parish of Brough, in 1866 Hillbeck became a civil parish in its own right. On 18 June 1974 the parish was renamed from "Hillbeck" to "Helbeck".

== See also ==
- Listed buildings in Helbeck
