= Route summit =

A route summit is the highest point on a transportation route crossing higher ground. The term is often used in describing railway routes, less often in road transportation. In canal terminology, the highest pound on a route is called the summit pound.

== Examples of usage ==
=== Rail ===
- Beattock Summit
- Stainmore Summit, formerly the second highest railway in England until its closure in 1962
- Summit Tank - highest point Unanderra - Moss Vale
- Cullerin - highest point Sydney - Albury
- Shap
