= Holland Road, London =

Road in Kensington, London

Coordinates: 51°30′05″N 0°12′45″W

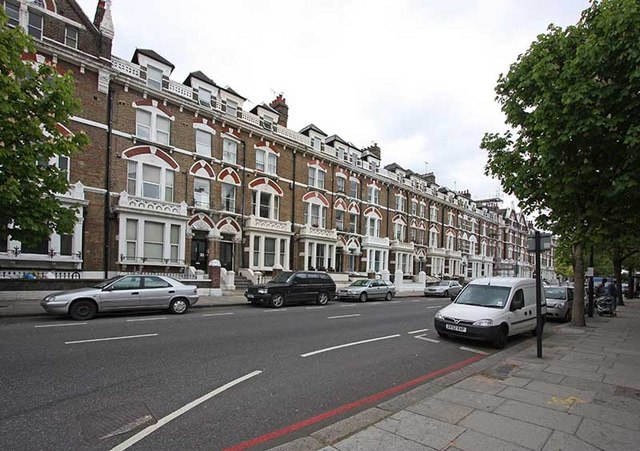
Holland Road, W14.

Holland Road is a road in Kensington, London, which connects Kensington High Street with the Holland Park roundabout. The southernmost section is one-way (northbound only, returning via Addison Road) and forms part of the Kensington/Earl's Court one-way system.

== Location ==
The road forms part of the A3220. To the east is Addison Road and Holland Park. To the west is West Kensington and Kensington (Olympia) station.

== Etymology ==
Like Holland House and Holland Park, the road is named after the Earls and Barons Holland, who owned the estate on which the road was later built.

== Architecture ==
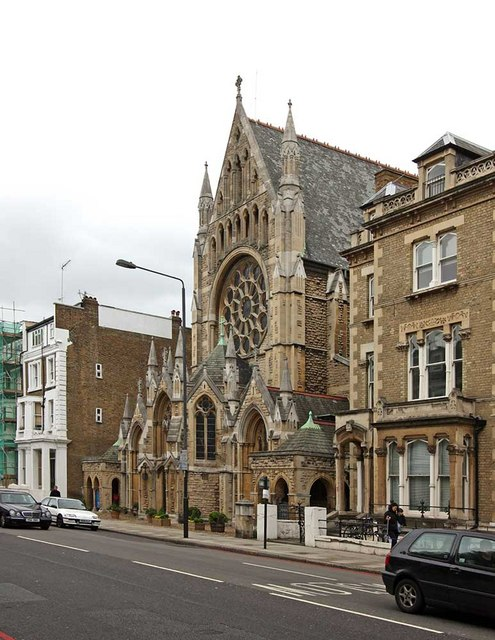
St John the Baptist Church on Holland Road.

Holland Road is a prominent residential road situated in the district of Holland Park within the Royal Borough of Kensington and Chelsea. This partly tree lined boulevard runs roughly north - south and is characterised by its imposing period Victorian architecture. Most of the terraced town houses are 4 or 5 storeys high and feature either painted Italianate stucco or ornate brick facades and retain numerous original features. As with many such very large Kensington townhouses constructed in the 1870s, most of the houses have since been converted into spacious and sought after self-contained apartments.

Part of the southern stretch of the road, between nos. 40 and 94, is also within the Royal Borough of Kensington and Chelsea's Holland conservation area. The architectural style adopted in construction is particularly notable and worthy of preservation because the terrace is essentially classical in its proportions, whilst being Gothic in its ornamentation.

== Public transport ==
Holland Road is especially well served by public transport (zone 2) with Holland Park, Shepherds Bush, Kensington (Olympia), and High Street Kensington train stations within easy walking distance as well as numerous bus routes passing along the road.

== Residents past and present ==
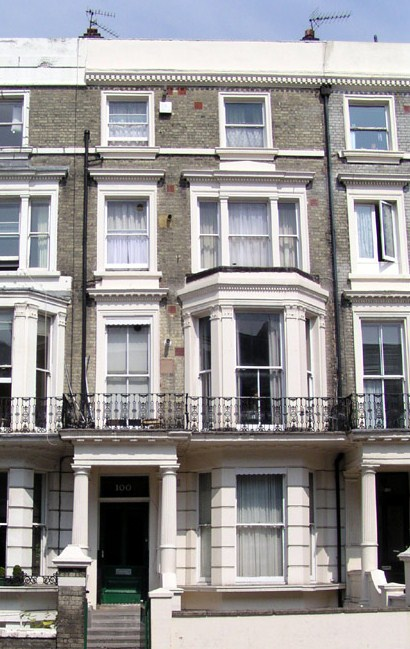
100 Holland Road, a former residence of Freddie Mercury.

The greenery of Holland Park itself (the public park) is only a five-minute walk away to the east. Famous former residents include Freddie Mercury, the lead singer of the rock group Queen. He wrote the classic bestseller Bohemian Rhapsody whilst living at 100 Holland Road in the 1970s. The front cover from a record album is from a photo session of Queen taken at Mercury's flat in Holland Road.

British solicitor John Indermaur lived at 114 Holland Road in the early twentieth-century.

Until 2017, the corporate headquarters of Universal Music were located on the corner of Holland Road and Kensington High Street.

Since 1962, the only showroom of Bristol Cars has been located on the corner of Holland Road and Kensington High Street. As a result of Bristol Cars' liquidation, the future of the showroom is unknown.

The Society of Science, Letters and Art, a late 19th century bogus learned society, had its headquarters at Addison House, 160 Holland Road (demolished).
