= Long Meg Mine =

Gypsum mine in Cumbria, England

Coordinates: 54.732742°N 2.679033°W

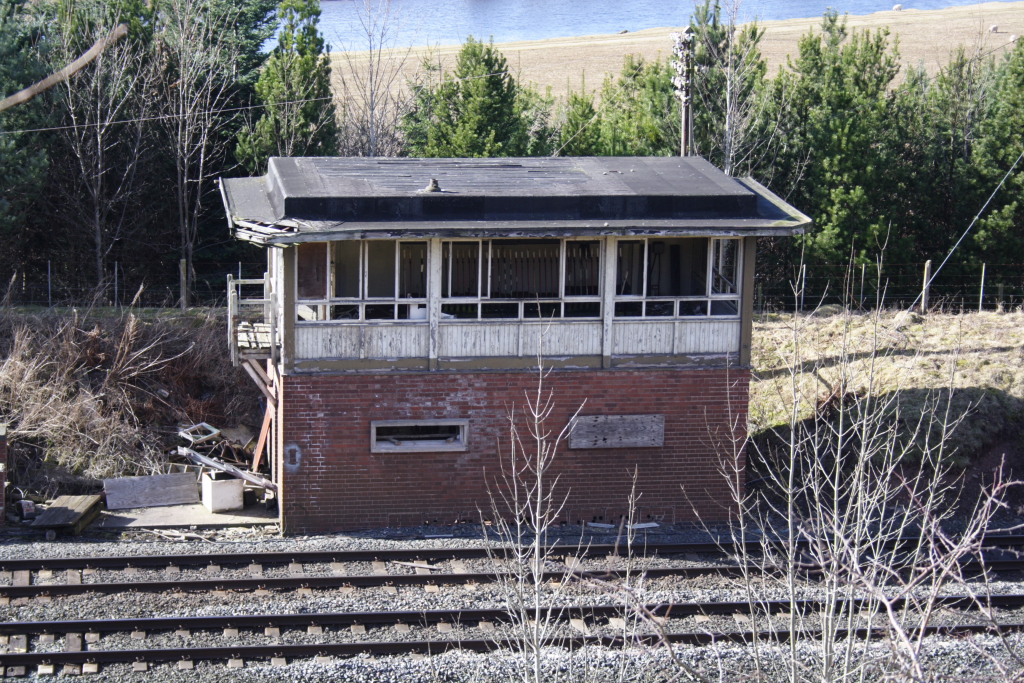
Long Meg Mine Signal Box on the Settle-Carlisle Railway

Long Meg Mine is a disused gypsum mine just north of Little Salkeld, Cumbria in the area known as Cave Wood Valley. It was operated between 1880 and 1976.

== History ==
The Long Meg Plaster Company Ltd. was established in 1880, driving an underground drift upon which operations commenced in 1885. In 1886 a standard gauge extension line was connected to the site from the Settle-Carlisle Railway (a distance of around 0.35 km). The workforce in this year is recorded as being 12 (all Surface), the name of the mine Long Meg Drift and agent A.K.Busby.

In 1902 the workforce is recorded as being 26 (12 Underground and 14 Surface). By 1914 however this figure had dropped to 6 (4 Underground and 2 Surface) and the mine was abandoned on an unknown date in 1914/1915. The operator at this time was the Carlisle Plaster and Cement Company Ltd.

The mine was re-opened in 1922 for the extraction of anhydrite by the Long Meg Plaster and Mineral Company Ltd. This was purchased in 1939 by the British Plaster Board Ltd. (now known as British Gypsum). Until its closure in January 1976 its workforce fluctuated between 12 and 29 (4 and 22 Underground; 4 and 18 Surface).

The 1 millionth tonne of anhydrite was shipped to the plant in Widnes on 20 May 1959 and before closure over 5 million tonnes were extracted.

The mine owned several locomotives used to shunt carts between the mine, the plaster mill and the Settle-Carlisle Railway junction. A 0-4-0 Barclay locomotive named "W.S.T." (after the plaster company's deputy chairman William Steuart Trimble) that was delivered to the site on 10 June 1954 and was transferred in 1969 now resides at the Bowes Railway in Tyne and Wear.

== Present day ==
Today the mine is in a poor state of repair however much of the site can be viewed from the public footpath that runs along the banks of the River Eden from Little Salkeld to Lacy's Caves. The rail tracks have not been lifted in many places and the public footpath follows its path with metalwork and sleepers exposed. The signal box used for the branch line still exists but like the mine's buildings has been left to decay. Various objects have been left on the site, including train carts. What appears to be an entrance to the drift has been filled in. The newer buildings have "Danger - Keep out" signs, however in the area occupied by the older buildings there appear to be no fences or notices from the main footpath. The site has clearly been used by the public in recent years and various buildings are adorned with graffiti.

== See also ==
Gypsum in Cumbria by Ian Tyler (2000) - ISBN 0-9523028-4-5
