= Industrial Railway Society =

United Kingdom organisation, founded 1949

The Industrial Railway Society was founded in the United Kingdom in 1949 as the "Birmingham Locomotive Club – Industrial Locomotive Information Section".

It is devoted to the study of all aspects, and all gauges, of privately owned industrial railways and locomotives, both in the UK and overseas.

Examples include railways at collieries, opencast coal pits, steel works, gas works, peat bogs, Ministry of Defence depots, engineering works, docks, electric power stations; and locomotives powered by steam, diesel, petrol, battery, and electricity.

The society has published many handbooks on industrial railways and their locomotives and, for members, issues two regular magazines: The Industrial Railway Record (giving historical information) and the Bulletin (giving current information).
