= Battle of Stainmore =

954 battle in the Viking invasions of England

- Part of the Viking invasions of England
Date	954
Location	Stainmore, Westmorland, England 54°31′40″N 2°15′35″W
Result	Victory for Oswulf

Commanders and leaders
Oswulf I of Bamburgh; Maccus, son of Olaf	Eric Bloodaxe †
- Location within modern Cumbria

The Battle of Stainmore was a conflict between Eric Bloodaxe and his English opponents, led possibly by Oswulf I of Bamburgh or a son of Olaf named Maccus. Eric had previously been invited by the Northumbrians to rule as their king and had come into conflict with King Eadred of England, on whose behalf Maccus may have been acting. Eric's death at Stainmore led to the end of the independence of Scandinavian York, with Oswulf becoming earl of Northumbria and ruling on behalf of Eadred.

== Background ==
Olaf Sihtricson first became the ruler of Northumbria in 941 and led a successful raid on Tamworth in 943 after which Edmund I of England retaliated and at first the two rulers made peace. This ended the following year when Edmund attacked Northumbria and Olaf was forced out, succeeding in being named king of Dublin. English rule of Northumbria would lapse following Edmund's death in 946, with his successor Eadred accepting pledges in 947 from Wulfstan, Archbishop of York, and other Northumbrian leaders in a manner suggesting they had considerable independence.

The Anglo-Saxon Chronicle records that in 948 the Northumbrians chose Eric Bloodaxe as their king, reneging on their pledge to Eadred. Wulfstan in particular welcomed Eric for the protection he offered against the West Saxon kings of England. Eadred responded by raiding Northumbria and after a counterattack led by Eric destroyed his rearguard at Castleford Eadred threatened to retaliate, prompting the Northumbrians to abandon Eric as their king.

Olaf was invited by the Northumbrians to return as king in 949, once again betraying their loyalty to Eadred. Olaf would again be replaced by Eric in 952.

== Battle ==
In 954 Eric was again removed by the Northumbrians and was killed at Stainmore, possibly while making for Dublin or the Isles.

English sources state that Eric was killed by an Earl Maccus, son of Olaf, which may or may not be a reference to Olaf Sihtricson. It is possible Maccus was acting in part on behalf of Eadred, who may have used the established tactic of setting one Viking leader against another. Roger of Wendover writes Eric was killed after being betrayed by Oswulf I of Bamburgh. Scandinavian sources state Eric died leading an outnumbered army against his foes, and was accompanied by five Hebridean kings and two earls of Orkney.

== Aftermath ==
Eric's death ended the independence of Scandinavian York which became part of England. Eadred choose Oswulf as earl of Northumbria, and from this point Northumbria was ruled by earls acting on behalf of the kings of England. Viking raids in England did not resume until the 980s.

After Eric's death, his wife Gunnhild left England with their five sons and joined her brother Harald Bluetooth in Jutland. From here they began a campaign to reclaim the throne of Norway, which Eric had a claim to, and would ultimately succeed when Harald Greycloak became king after the battle of Stord c. 960.

== Sources ==
- BBC History Magazine (September 2017). "Bloodaxe's Final Stand". BBC History Magazine. BBC: 34.
- Cannon, J. A. (2009a). "Erik Bloodaxe". The Oxford Companion to British History. Oxford University Press. ISBN 978-0-19-956763-8.
- Cannon, J. A. (2009b). "Stainmore, battle of". The Oxford Companion to British History. Oxford University Press. ISBN 978-0-19-956763-8.
- Costambeys, Marios (2004). "Erik Bloodaxe [Eiríkr Blóðöx, Eiríkr Haraldsson]". Oxford Dictionary of National Biography (online ed.). Oxford University Press. doi:10.1093/ref:odnb/49265. (Subscription, Wikipedia Library access or UK public library membership required.)
- Hudson, Benjamin T. (2004). "Óláf Sihtricson [Óláfr Sigtryggsson, Amlaíb Cúarán]". Oxford Dictionary of National Biography (online ed.). Oxford University Press. doi:10.1093/ref:odnb/20671. (Subscription, Wikipedia Library access or UK public library membership required.)
- Foot, Sarah (2010). "Northumbria". In Bjork, Robert E. (ed.). The Oxford Dictionary of the Middle Ages. Oxford University Press. ISBN 978-0-19-866262-4.
- Peterson, Gary Dean (21 June 2016). Vikings and Goths: A History of Ancient and Medieval Sweden. McFarland. ISBN 978-1-4766-2434-1.
- Rollason, David (25 September 2003). Northumbria, 500-1100: Creation and Destruction of a Kingdom. Cambridge University Press. ISBN 978-0-521-81335-8.
- Stenton, Frank M. (7 June 2001). Anglo-Saxon England. Oxford: Oxford University Press. ISBN 978-0-19-280139-5.
- Williams, Ann (2004). "Eadred [Edred]". Oxford Dictionary of National Biography (online ed.). Oxford University Press. doi:10.1093/ref:odnb/8510. (Subscription, Wikipedia Library access or UK public library membership required.)
- Williams, Gareth (17 February 2011). "Eric Bloodaxe". BBC History. BBC.
