= Lacy's Caves =

Caves in Cumbria, England

Coordinates: 54.73777°N 2.67868°W

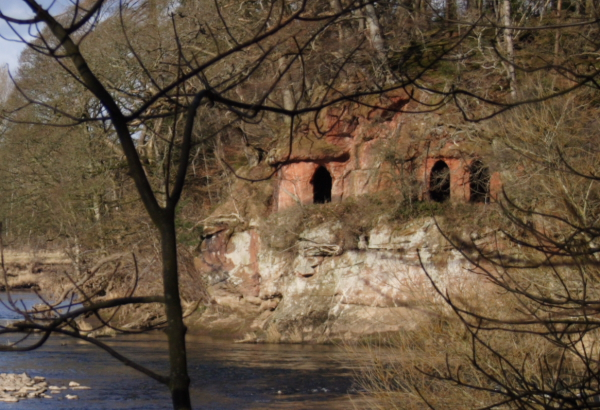
Looking North towards Lacy's Caves, by the River Eden

Lacy's Caves are a series of five chambers in the red sandstone cliff of the River Eden, just north of Little Salkeld, Cumbria, England, near Nunnery, Cumbria, at grid reference NY564383.

They are named after Lieutenant-Colonel Samuel Lacy of nearby Salkeld Hall, who commissioned their carving in the 18th century. The reason for their creation is unknown; however, they were used by Lacy for entertaining guests, and the area was originally planted with ornamental gardens.

The site is a listed Regionally Important Geological Site by Eden District Council and public footpaths to the site are well maintained. Some of the path follows the line of a former tramway connecting Long Meg Mine with the nearby Settle–Carlisle line. The site is close to the ancient stone circle Long Meg and Her Daughters, and is on a popular circular walk.
