= Little Salkeld =

Village in Cumbria, England

Coordinates: 54.7165°N 2.6730°W

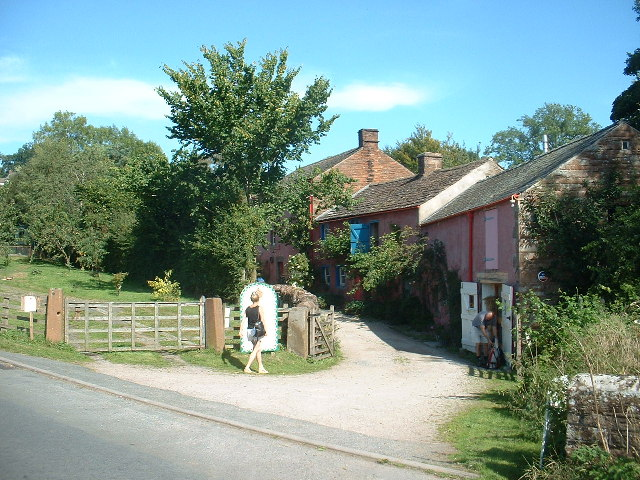
- Little Salkeld Flour Mill

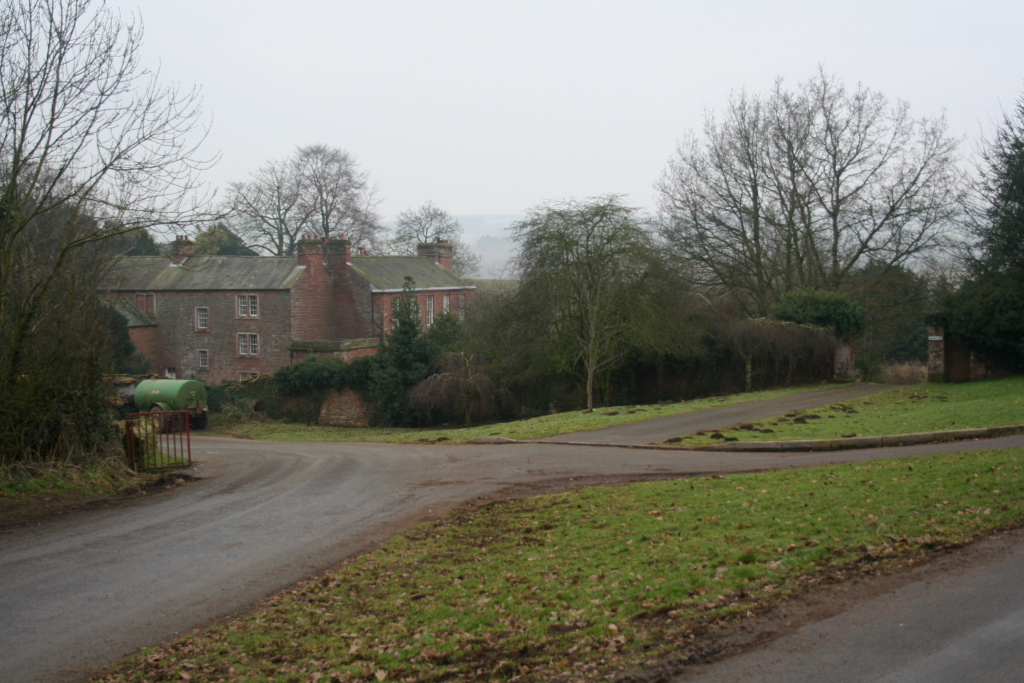
- General view of village

- Location in Eden, Cumbria Location within Cumbria
- OS grid reference: NY566359
- Civil parish: Hunsonby
- Unitary authority: Westmorland and Furness
- Ceremonial county: Cumbria
- Region: North West
- Country: England
- Sovereign state: United Kingdom
- Post town: PENRITH
- Postcode district: CA10
- Dialling code: 01768
- Police: Cumbria
- Fire: Cumbria
- Ambulance: North West
- UK Parliament: Penrith and Solway

Little Salkeld is a small village and former civil parish, now in the parish of Hunsonby, in the Westmorland and Furness district of Cumbria, England, a few miles to the north east of Penrith. In 1931 the civil parish had a population of 91.

== History ==
The manor at Little Salkeld was confirmed by King Edward I in 1292. It is believed to be the original home of the Salkeld family of landowners.

Little Salkeld was formerly a township in Addingham parish, from 1866 Little Salkeld was a civil parish in its own right until it was abolished on 1 April 1934 and merged with Hunsonby and Winskill to create Hunsonby.

== Places of interest ==
Little Salkeld Watermill, built in 1745, is a traditional English 18th-century water mill.

Salkeld Hall is the village's largest house; built in the 16th century incorporating earlier walls. It is privately owned.

The village contains a vicarage but no church - it was built for Addingham parish church one mile to the north near Glassonby.

Popular with walkers – it is the closest village to Lacy's Caves and Long Meg and Her Daughters.

== Transport ==
Little Salkeld can be reached by car 1½ miles from Langwathby off the A686, approximately 6 miles from M6 J40.

It lies on the C2C Cycle Route.

Little Salkeld railway station on the Settle-Carlisle Railway and branch line to the Long Meg Mine were both closed in the 1970s, although the disused platforms still remain and the station building is well maintained as a private house. The closest station is Langwathby. In 1918 the Little Salkeld rail accident in nearby Long Meg Cutting killed seven people. A second accident occurred at the station in 1933, which resulted in the death of one railwayman and injuries to a further five members of railway staff and thirty passengers.

The village is believed to have been connected at one time by a bridge over the River Eden to Great Salkeld.

== See also ==
- Listed buildings in Hunsonby
