= Stainmore Summit =

Summit on the Cumbria/County Durham/North Yorkshire border, England

Coordinates: 54°30′33″N 2°11′21″W

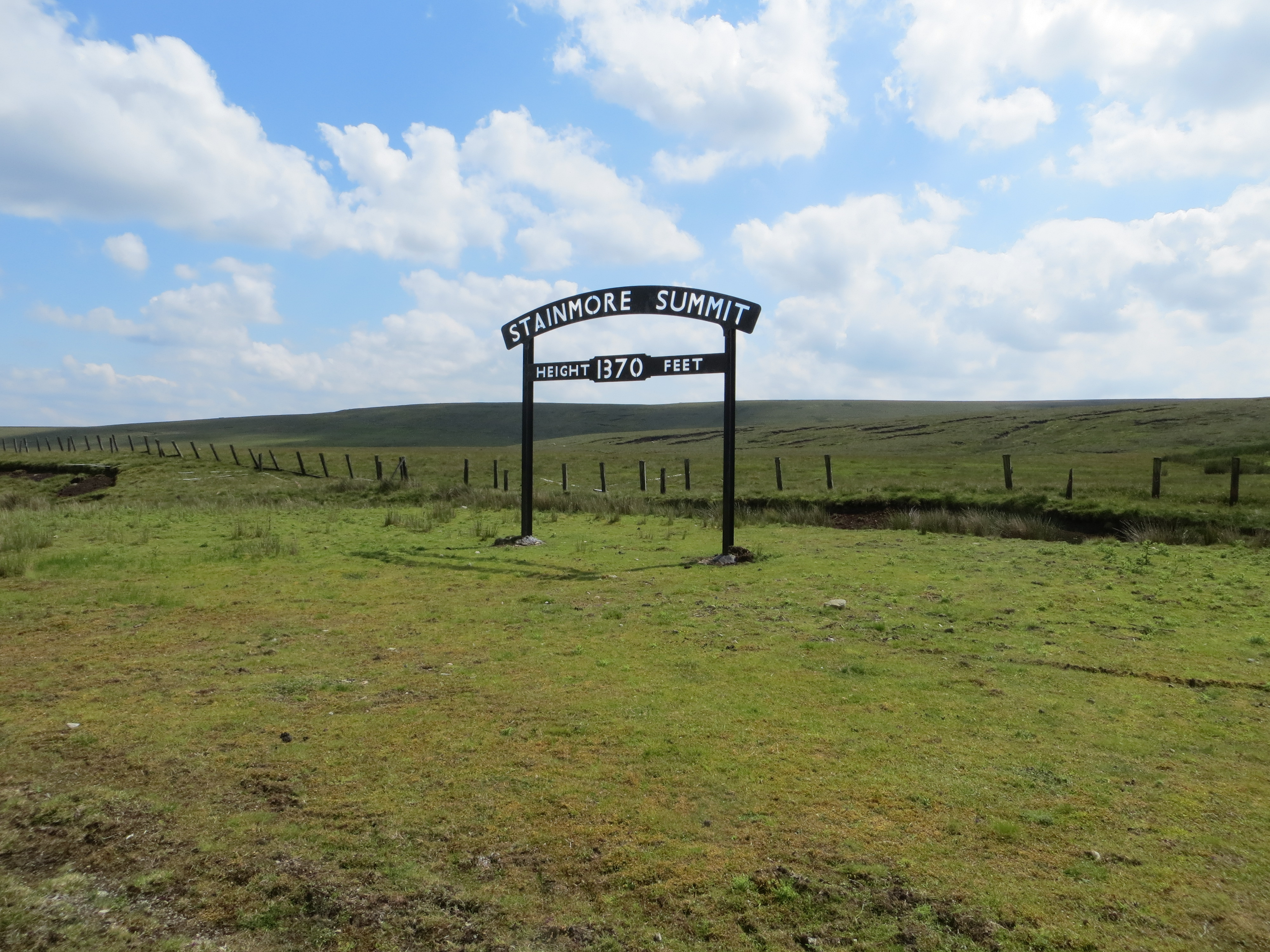
New sign marking spot of old one

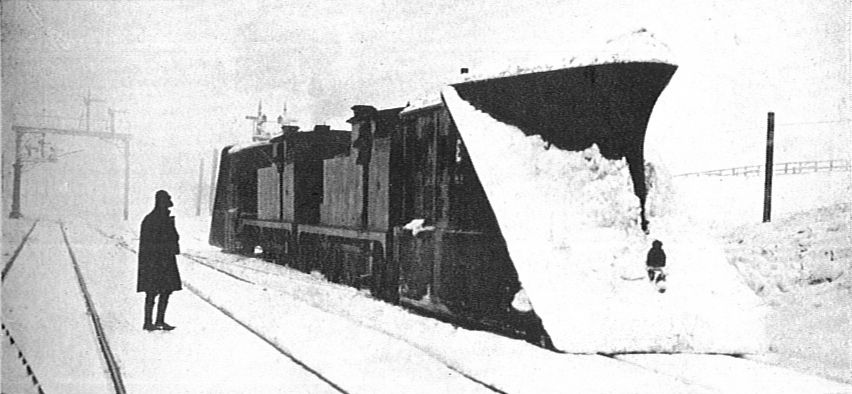
Snowploughs on the line in 1927

Stainmore Summit is the highest point on the trans-Pennine South Durham & Lancashire Union Railway, also known as the Stainmore Railway in Northern England. Located on Stainmore between Barras and Bowes stations, the railway over the summit was the highest in England at 1,370 ft (418 m) until its closure in 1962. The location was marked by a famous cast-iron sign which is now preserved. It was formerly held at the Darlington Railway Centre and Museum but has since moved to the New Hall at the National Railway Museum in York, North Yorkshire.

Whilst there wasn't a station at Stainmore, trains did halt here to let relatives of the railway workers on and off the trains to enable them to get transported off the summit. The railway had several cottages at the summit.

This pass is commonly referred to by geographers as the Stainmore Gap.
