= Augill Castle =

Gothic country house in Cumbria, England

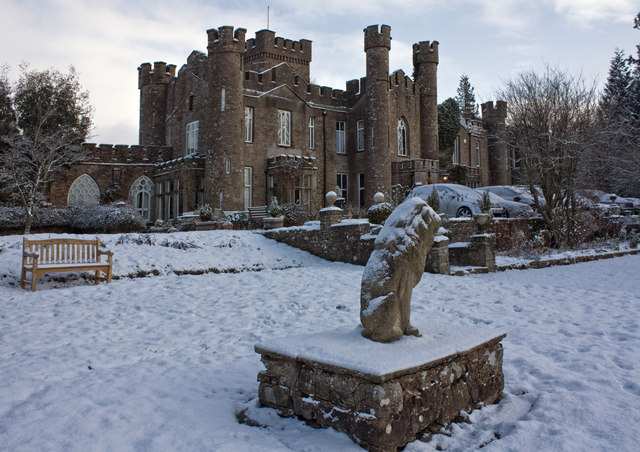
- Location: Brough, Cumbria, England
- Coordinates: 54°31′10″N 2°18′05″W
- Built: 1841
- Architectural style(s): Gothic Revival

Augill Castle is a Gothic Revival country house in Brough, Cumbria. Originally a private residence, it was later converted into a hotel.

== History ==
Augill Castle was built in 1841, set on a fifty-four acre estate, by John Bagot Pearson of Kirkby Lonsdale. In 1875, the Rev. Robert Clayton Heslop had a mortgage interest on the premise of founding a preparatory school, but he fell into bankruptcy. In 1878, the castle was sold to Mr. Collins of London. In 1888, the castle was owned by lawyer and writer John Indermaur. In 1892 it was sold at auction to J.H. Jackson of Culgaith.

It is grade II listed on the National Heritage List for England.
