= Hunsonby =

Village and civil parish in Cumbria, England

Coordinates: 54.714°N 2.651°W

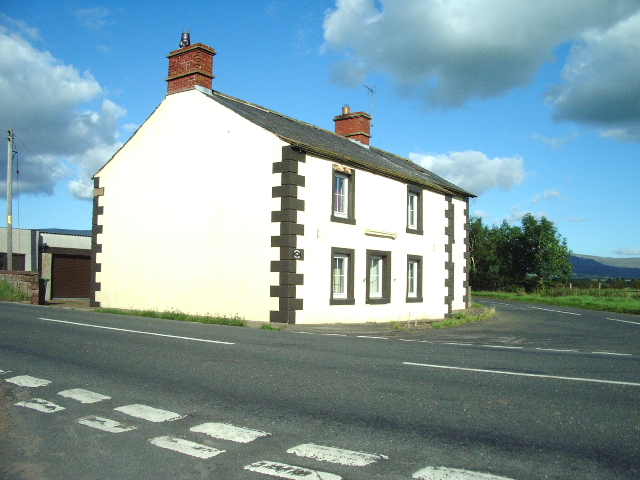
- Hunters Cottage

- Location in Eden, Cumbria Location within Cumbria
- Population: 388 (2011 Census)
- OS grid reference: NY5835
- Civil parish: Hunsonby
- Unitary authority: Westmorland and Furness
- Ceremonial county: Cumbria
- Region: North West
- Country: England
- Sovereign state: United Kingdom
- Post town: Penrith
- Postcode district: CA10
- Dialling code: 01768
- Police: Cumbria
- Fire: Cumbria
- Ambulance: North West
- UK Parliament: Penrith and Solway

Hunsonby is a village and civil parish in the Westmorland and Furness district of Cumbria, England, 7 miles (11 km) north east of Penrith. The parish is located 28 miles (45 km) south east of the city of Carlisle. Within the parish is the ancient stone circle of Long Meg and Her Daughters but not the nearby standing stone of Little Meg which is located near Langwathby. In 2011 the Census reported the parish to have a total population of 388.

In 1870–72, John Marius Wilson's Imperial Gazetteer of England and Wales described Hunsonby (and Winskill) as:

"Hunsonby and Winskel, a township in Addingham parish, Cumberland; on a branch of the river Eden, 4 miles SSE of Kirkoswald. Real property, £1,690. Pop., 208. Houses, 38. There is a Wesleyan chapel."

== History ==
=== 19th century ===
The civil parish of Hunsonby was formed in 1934 from a merger of the two parishes of Hunsonby and Winskill and Little Salkeld, both of which were formed in 1866 out of the ecclesiastical and former civil parish of Addingham.

=== 20th century ===
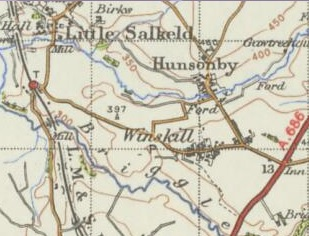
Historical Map on Hunsonby, published in 1945 by Ordnance Survey of Great Britain.

== Geography ==
Hunsonby is 11,397.593m² in area, with an area of 33.22m² used for domestic buildings.

== Places of worship ==
The only place of worship is an old Wesleyan Methodist chapel, which opened in 1862 but was closed in 2001.

== Population ==
Population Density 1881-2011

Over time, there hasn't been a massive change in Hunsonby's population density. Between 1881 and 1921, the population fluctuates marginally, but stays reasonably the same. In 1931, the population gradually starts to increase, reaching 371 residents in 1951. The following decade, the population then reaches 435 residents. However, in 2001 the population then decreases again, and the most recent data recorded shows Hunsonby with a population of 388 people.

== Employment ==
=== Occupational history ===
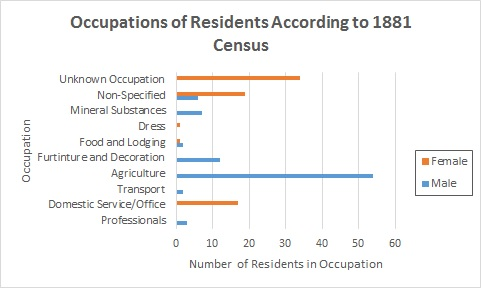
Occupations of Residents in Hunsonby, According to the 1881 Census. Shows both sexes.

According to the 1881 census, the occupation sector that employed the most residents and the most males was agriculture. For the majority of the female residents, their occupation was unknown, or not specified. Those whose occupation was specified, they worked in the Domestic service and office sector.

=== Recent occupational structure ===
The 2011 census revealed that still the biggest majority of workers are employed in the agriculture sector, matching Hunsonby's history. However, the second highest occupational group was managerial and Professional sector, showing a real shift in the occupations the last two centuries.

== Transport ==
The A686 is the main road located near Hunsonby, which is the main route to the market town of Penrith. The nearest train station is in Langwathby.

== See also ==
- Listed buildings in Hunsonby
