= Stainmore =

Geographic area on the border of Cumbria, County Durham and North Yorkshire

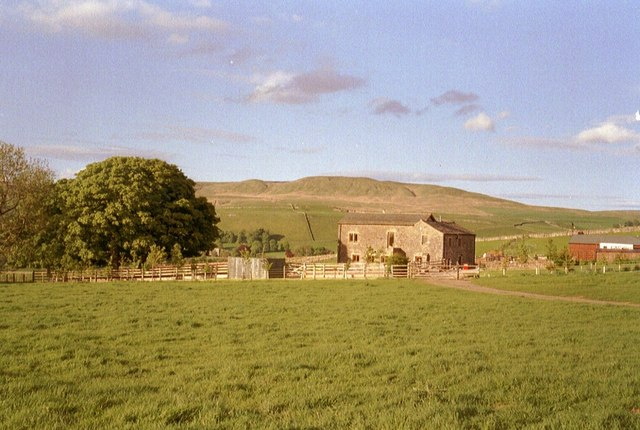
- Mousegill, with Great Knipe behind

- Location in Eden, Cumbria Location within Cumbria
- Population: 264 (2011)
- OS grid reference: NY8314
- Civil parish: Stainmore
- Unitary authority: Westmorland and Furness
- Ceremonial county: Cumbria
- Region: North West
- Country: England
- Sovereign state: United Kingdom
- Post town: KIRKBY STEPHEN
- Postcode district: CA17
- Dialling code: 01768
- Police: Cumbria
- Fire: Cumbria
- Ambulance: North West
- UK Parliament: Westmorland and Lonsdale

Stainmore is a remote geographic area in the Pennines on the border of Cumbria, County Durham and North Yorkshire. The name is used for a civil parish in the Westmorland and Furness of Cumbria, England, including the villages of North Stainmore and South Stainmore. The parish had a population of 253 in the 2001 census, increasing to 264 at the Census 2011. Stainmore Forest stretches further east into County Durham, towards Bowes.

== Geography ==
Stainmore is drained by the River Belah to the west and, to the east, the River Balder, Deepdale Beck, and the River Greta. It is crossed by the Roman road from Bowes to Brough, now part of the A66, and formerly by the Stainmore Railway. Each of these lines of communication has made use of the relatively low broad saddle between the higher hills to north and south which is commonly referred to as the Stainmore Gap. The summit of the former railway is around 420 metres (1,380 ft) above sea level, though the roads climb to slightly higher elevations. The Gap is coincident with the Stainmore Summit Fault which throws the relatively flat-lying Carboniferous rocks of the area down to the south. It acted as a conduit for Lake District-originated ice to pass eastwards during one or more glacial periods. There are several Regionally Important Geological / Geomorphological Sites (RIGS) in the Stainmore area, and Bowes Moor is a Site of Special Scientific Interest. The locality gives its name to the Stainmore Trough, a geological structure originating during the Carboniferous period and which lies between the Alston Block to the north and the Askrigg Block to the south.

== History ==
The place-name 'Stainmore' is first attested in a document of circa 990, where it appears as Stanmoir. It appears as Stanmore in the Charter Rolls for the reign of Henry II, and as Staynmor in the Placita de Quo Warranto of 1292. The name means 'stony moor'.

According to Roger of Wendover, it was where Eric Bloodaxe (d. 954), recently expelled from York, was betrayed and killed, an event which some historians believe to have taken place in a great battle.

There is a Roman marching camp at Rey Cross which is a Scheduled Monument and, immediately east of the camp is the Rey Cross itself (54.5056°N 2.14861°W), also called Rere Cross which is both a Scheduled Monument and a Listed Building.

The Ecclesiastical parish of Brough with Stainmore has two churches: St Michael's, Brough under Stainmore and St Stephen's, South Stainmore. St Stephen's was built by Cuthbert Buckell in 1600 and rebuilt by Henry Tufton, 11th Earl of Thanet in 1842–1843.

== Gallery ==
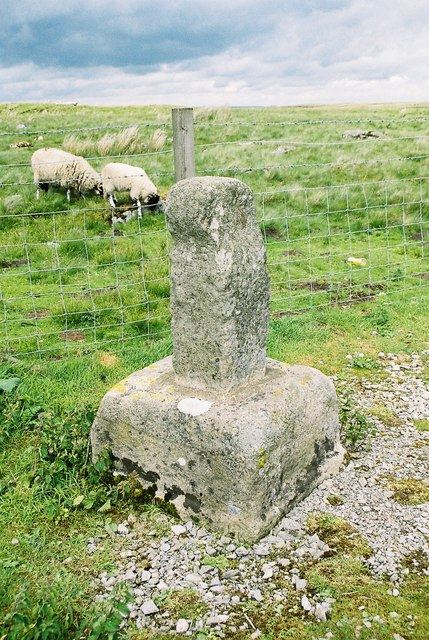
Rey Cross

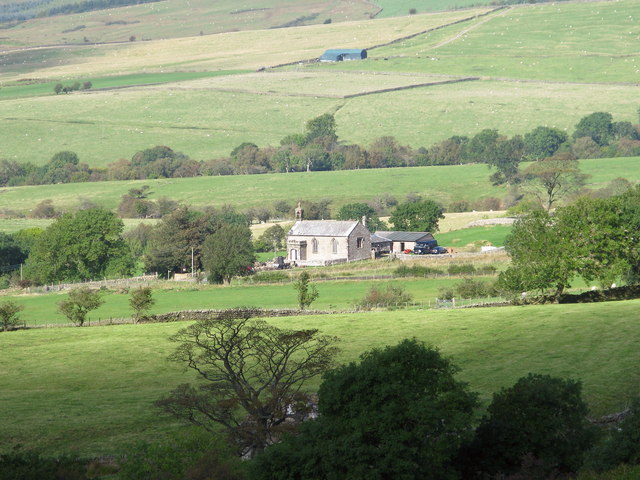
St Stephen’s, South Stainmore

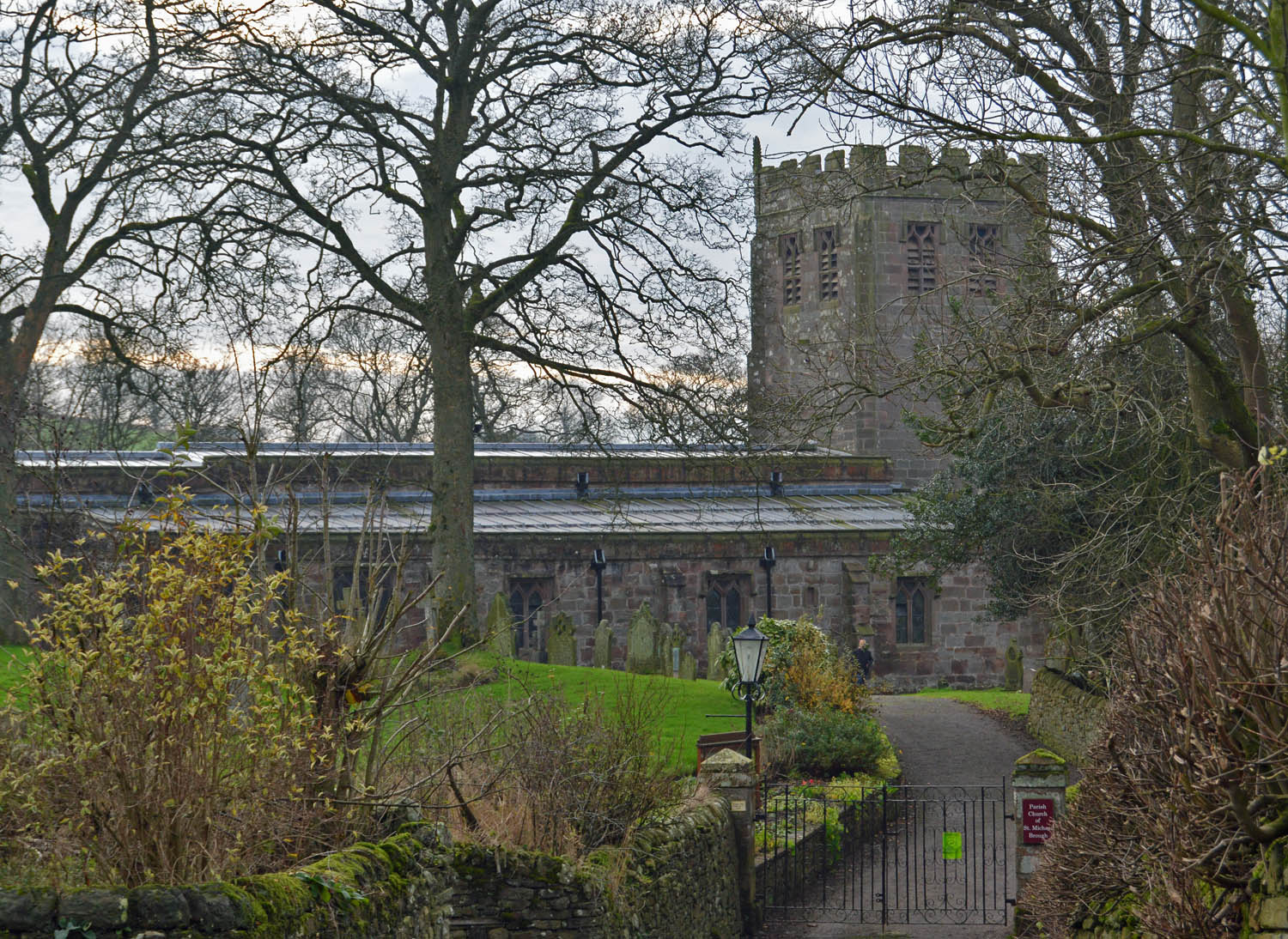
St Michael's

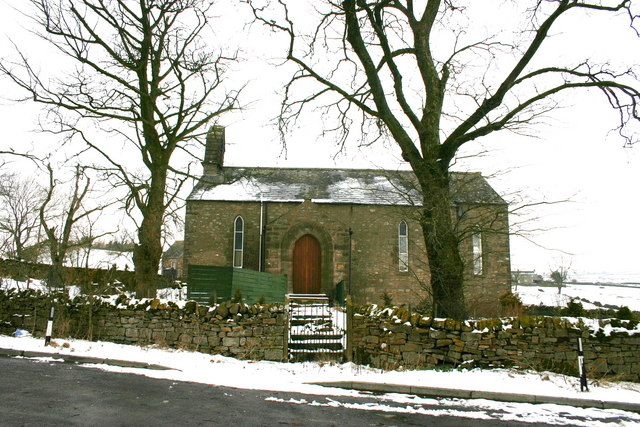
North Stainmore Chapel

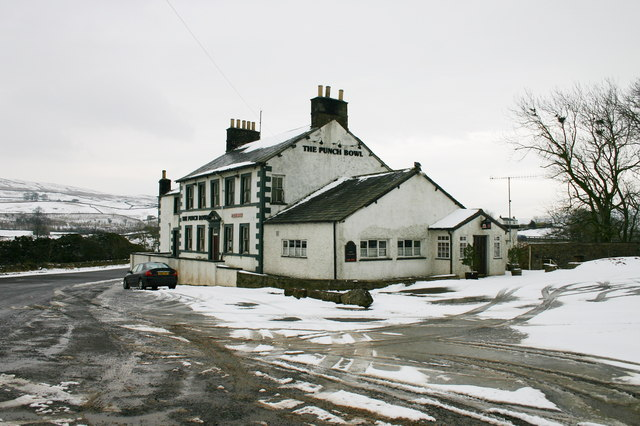
The Punchbowl

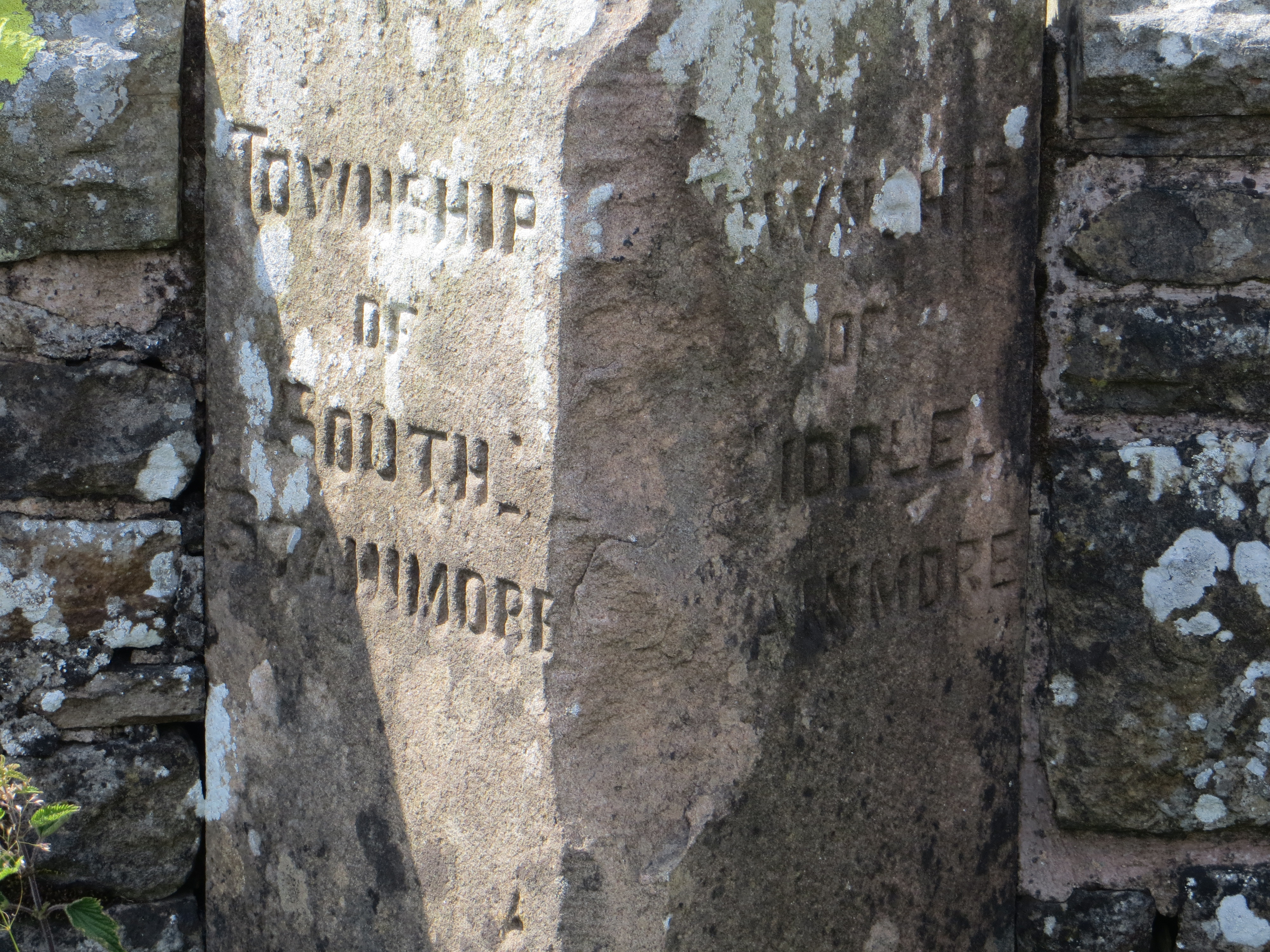
Boundary marker

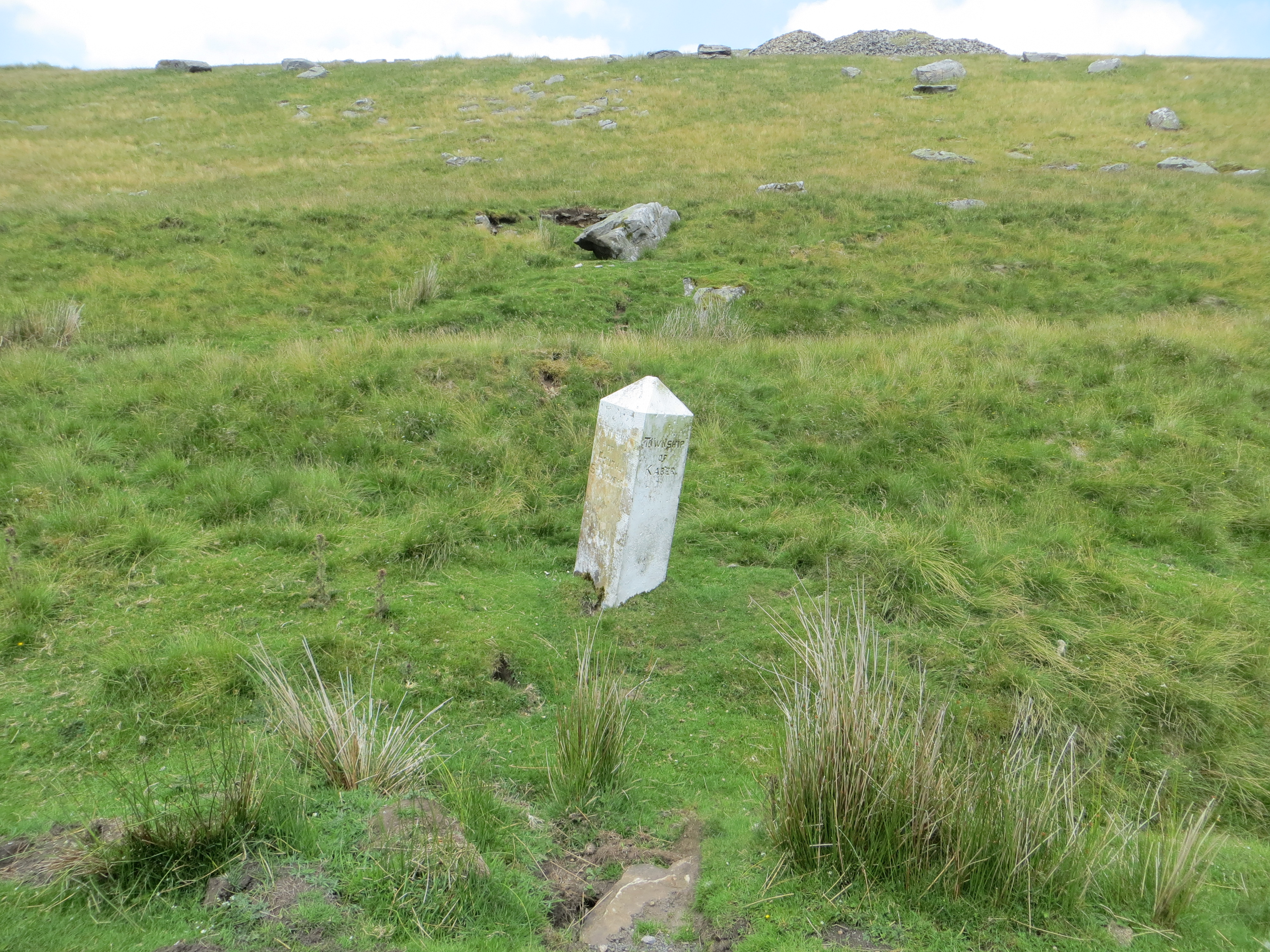
Boundary with Kaber

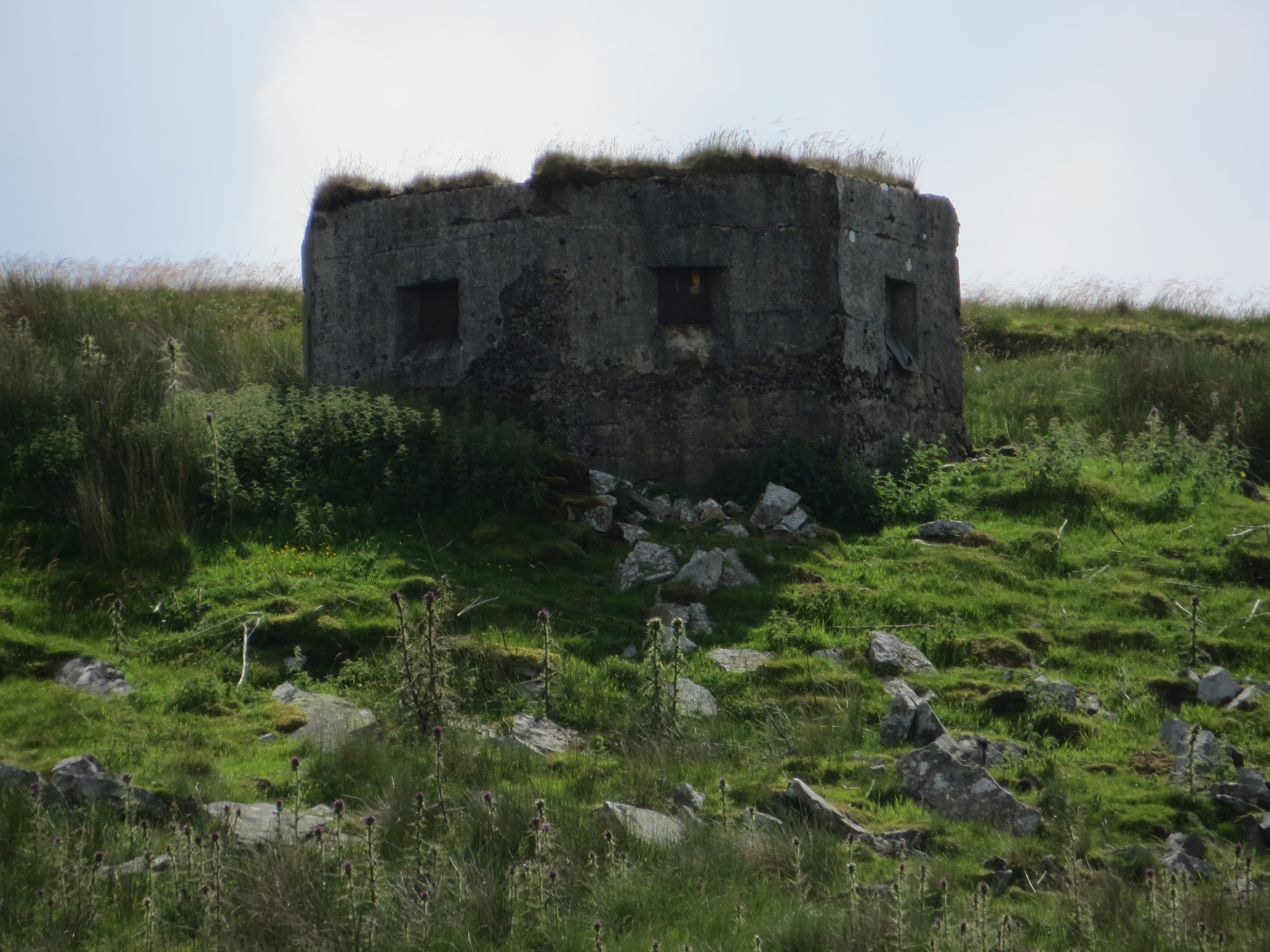
Pillbox near summit

== See also ==
- Listed buildings in Stainmore
