= Brough, Cumbria =

Village and civil parish in Cumbria, England

Coordinates: 54.52561°N 2.31875°W

Brough
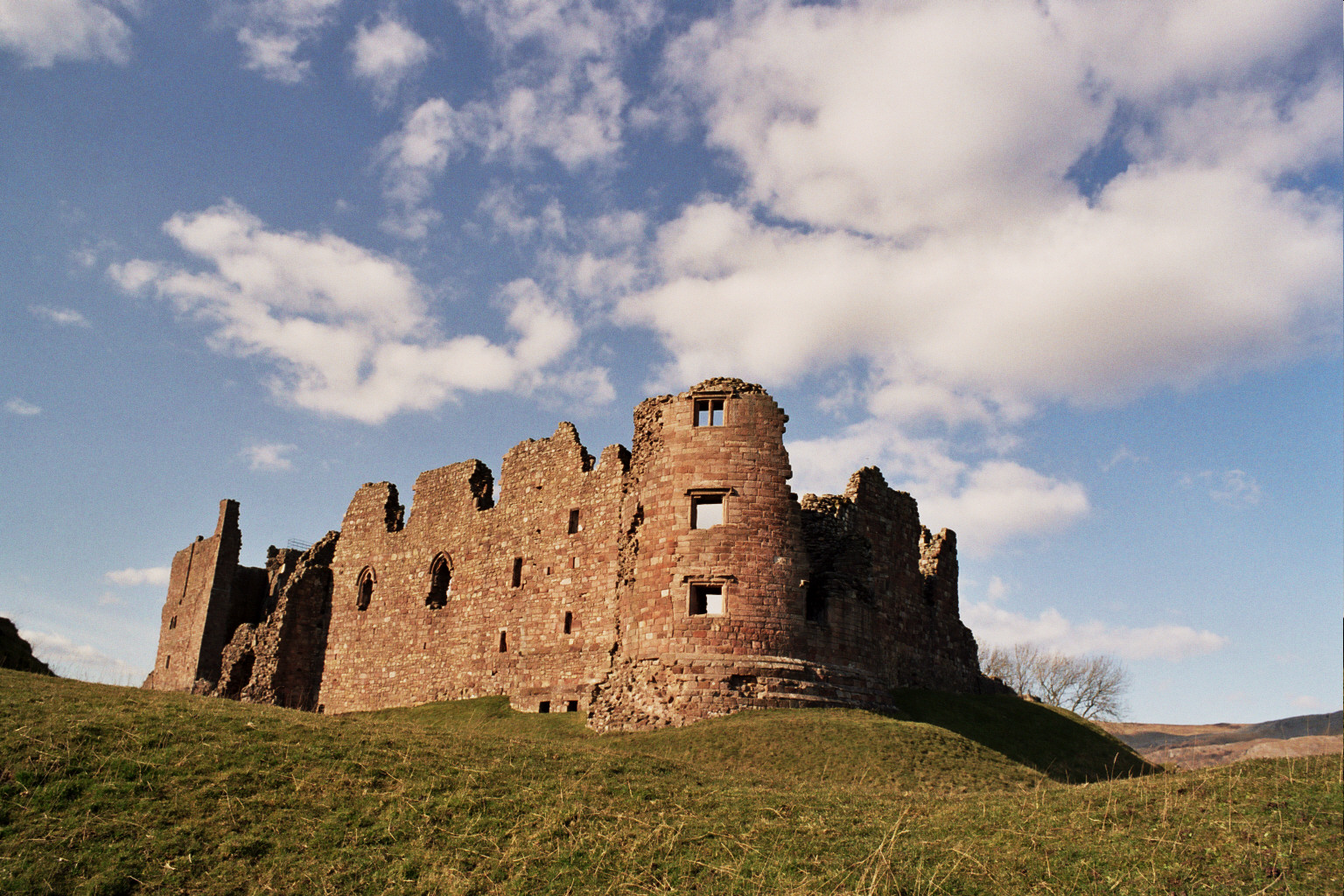
- Brough Castle from the south east

- Location in the former Eden district Location within Cumbria
- Population: 819 (2021 census)
- OS grid reference: NY794145
- Civil parish: Brough
- Unitary authority: Westmorland and Furness
- Ceremonial county: Cumbria
- Region: North West
- Country: England
- Sovereign state: United Kingdom
- Post town: Kirkby Stephen
- Postcode district: CA17
- Dialling code: 017683
- Police: Cumbria
- Fire: Cumbria
- Ambulance: North West
- UK Parliament: Westmorland and Lonsdale

Brough (/brʌf/), sometimes known as Brough under Stainmore, is a village and civil parish in the Westmorland and Furness district of Cumbria, England. Historically in Westmorland, the parish is on the western fringe of the Pennines near Stainmore. The village is about 8 miles (13 km) south east of Appleby-in-Westmorland and 28 miles (45 km) north east of Kendal, on the Swindale Beck and the A66 and A685 roads. At the 2021 census, the parish had a population of 819.

== History ==
The village is on the site of the Roman fort of Verterae (or Verteris, "the Forts"), on Dere Street, linking Luguvalium (Carlisle) with Eboracum (York) and points south. The area of the rectangular fort, which once occupied the land to the south of the Swindale Beck, is now a Scheduled Ancient Monument.

Brough Castle was built in the 11th century within the northern part of the former fort. Like many other castles in the area, Brough was restored in the 17th century by Lady Anne Clifford. The castle is now in the care of English Heritage and its ruins can be visited.

Brough has historically been divided into Market Brough, to the north, and Church Brough, to the south and centred on the castle and St Michael's Church. In 1977 this division was made physical by the construction of the Brough bypass dual carriageway, taking the A66 away from the village main street.

Up to some time before 1777, opposite the market cross going up towards Stainmore, there was a holy well dedicated to Saint Winifred (Gwenfrewi), which before the Reformation was a place of pilgrimage.

Nearby is Augill Castle, built in 1841 by John Bagot Pearson from Kirkby Lonsdale as a weekend retreat, a grade II listed building and now a hotel.

== Governance ==
Brough is in the parliamentary constituency of Westmorland and Lonsdale.

For local government, Brough is in the Westmorland and Furness unitary district. Historically, Brough was in the East Ward of Westmorland. From 1894 to 1935, it was in East Westmorland Rural District, and from 1935 to 1974 it was in North Westmorland Rural District, in the administrative county of Westmorland. From 1974, it was in the Eden District of the new county of Cumbria, until the current unitary district was created in 2023.

== Demographics ==
At the 2021 census, the civil parish had a population of 819 people in 363 households.

Census population of Brough parish
Census	Population	Female	Male	Households	Source
2001	680	339	341	286	
2011	751	377	374	314	
2021	819	415	404	363	

== Culture ==
Traditionally, on Twelfth Night, a burning holly tree (subsequently, ash trees were used) would be carried through the village, followed by a brass band. When the flames had partially gone out, the villagers would try to bring the tree to a pub, where the party would continue until the early hours of the morning.

Brough Agricultural Show is held every year in August. Cumbria Easter Rally is held yearly on Easter weekend. The village was also the venue for a popular fair on the second Thursday of March.

== St Michael's church ==
St Michael's Church is a large building with an impressive tower. The oldest parts date from the Norman period, and may have suffered during William I of Scotland's attack on the castle in 1174. The church was enlarged in the 14th century, to add the north aisle, and in the early 16th century when most of the existing structure was built.

The tower was constructed by Thomas Blenkinsop of Helbeck in 1513. There are four bells, which are noted as the heaviest ring of four bells hung for full circle ringing in the World. They were removed for restoration in November 2022. The restored bells were test rung on 29 June 2023 and blessed by Bishop James Bell at a combined benefice service on Sunday 30 July 2023.

There is a large war memorial within the nave.

== Sport ==
Brough Football Club is the village's local football team. After being re-founded in 2020, a football club in Brough can be dated back to 1889, possibly even earlier. The club's home pitch is Coltsford Common in Church Brough.

Brough FC has a men's team in Division Four of the Westmorland Football League, sponsored by Kendal Calling. The team plays in the club's traditional colours of blue and white stripes, with a red away kit.

== Gallery ==
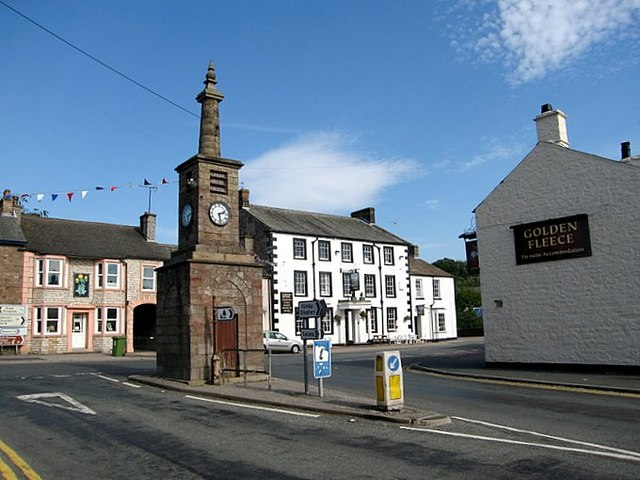
The Coronation clock tower

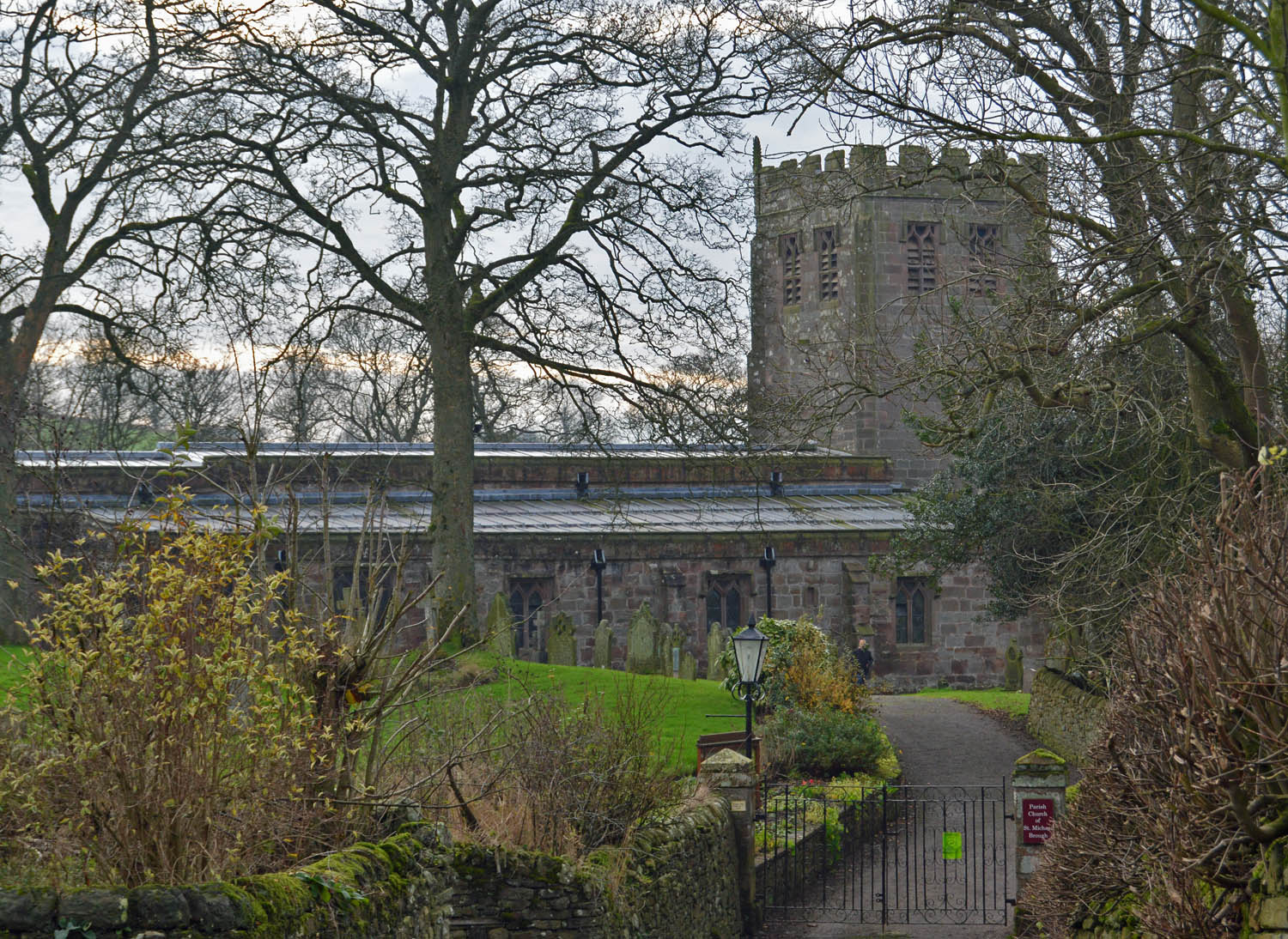
St Michael's Church.

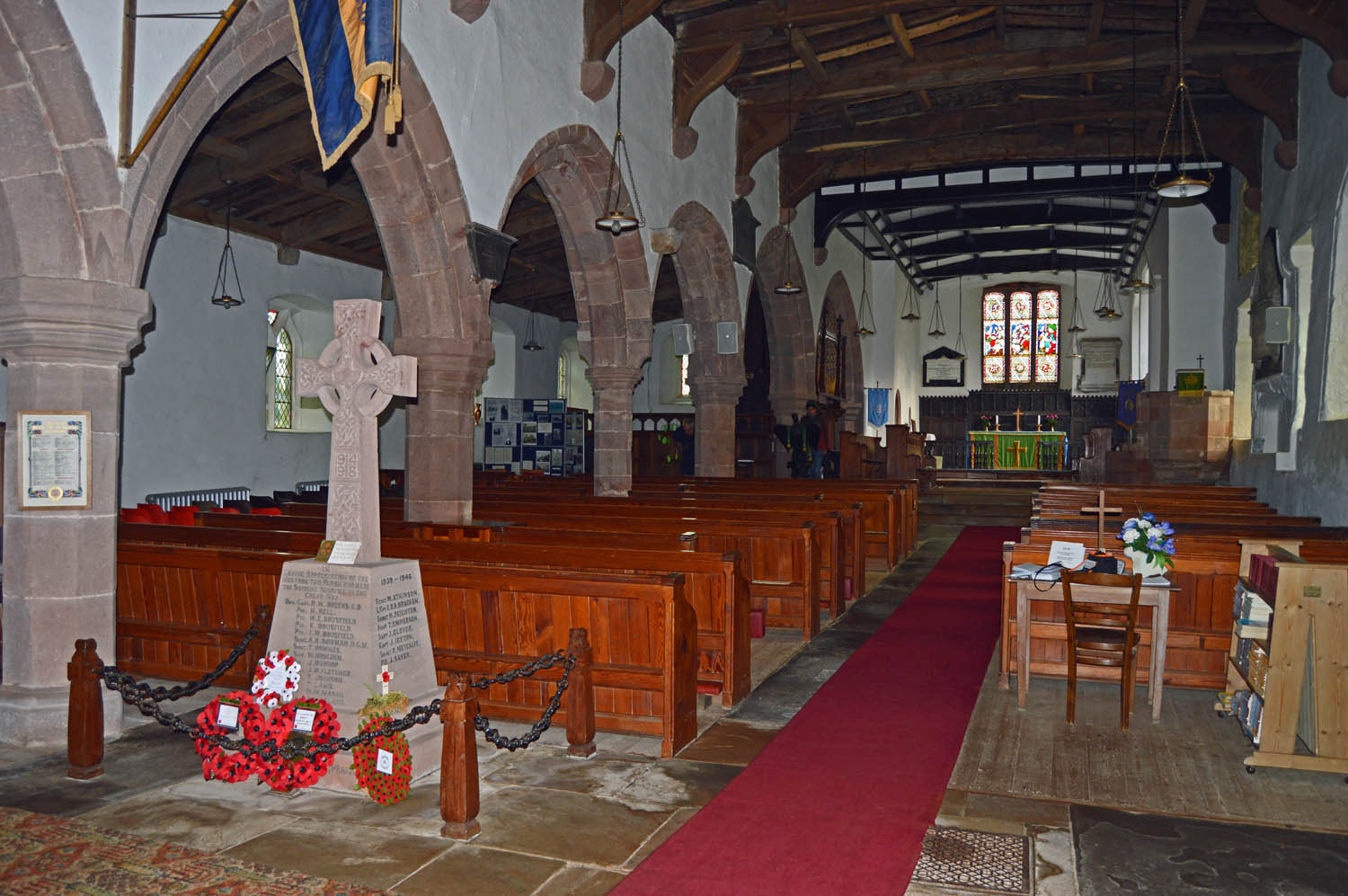
Interior of St Michael's church

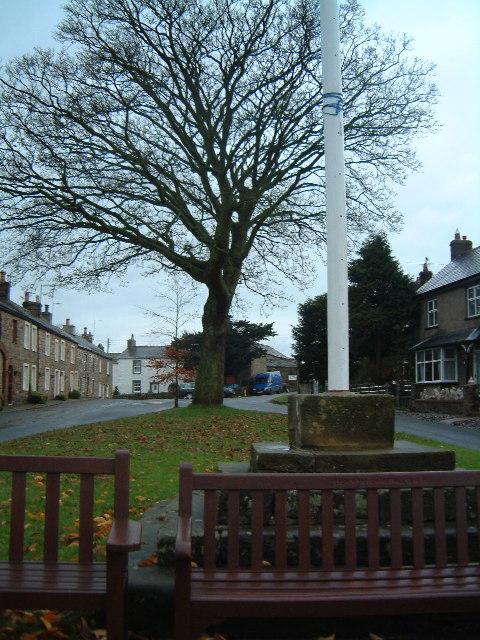
Church Brough - The Green

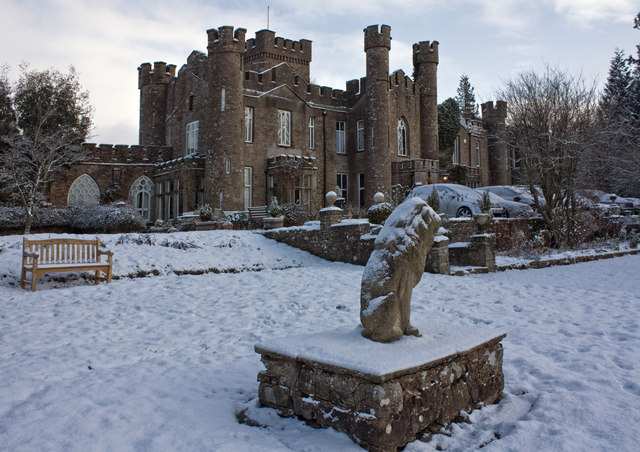
Augill Castle

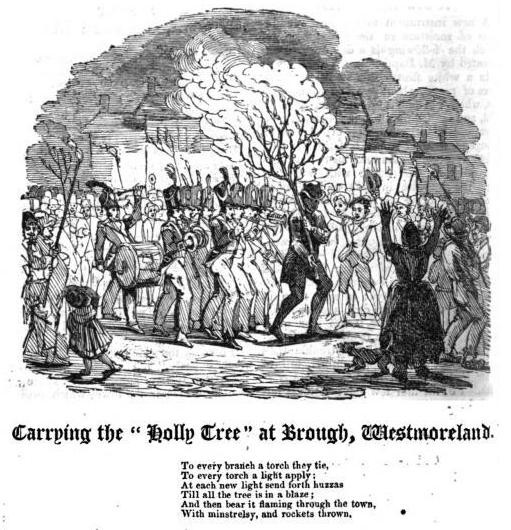
Parading the holly tree

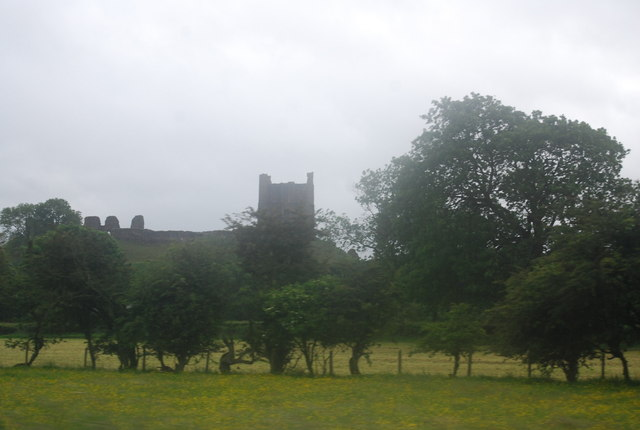
View of the castle from Coltsford Common

== See also ==
- Listed buildings in Brough, Cumbria
