= DalesRail =

Seasonal passenger railway service in Northern England

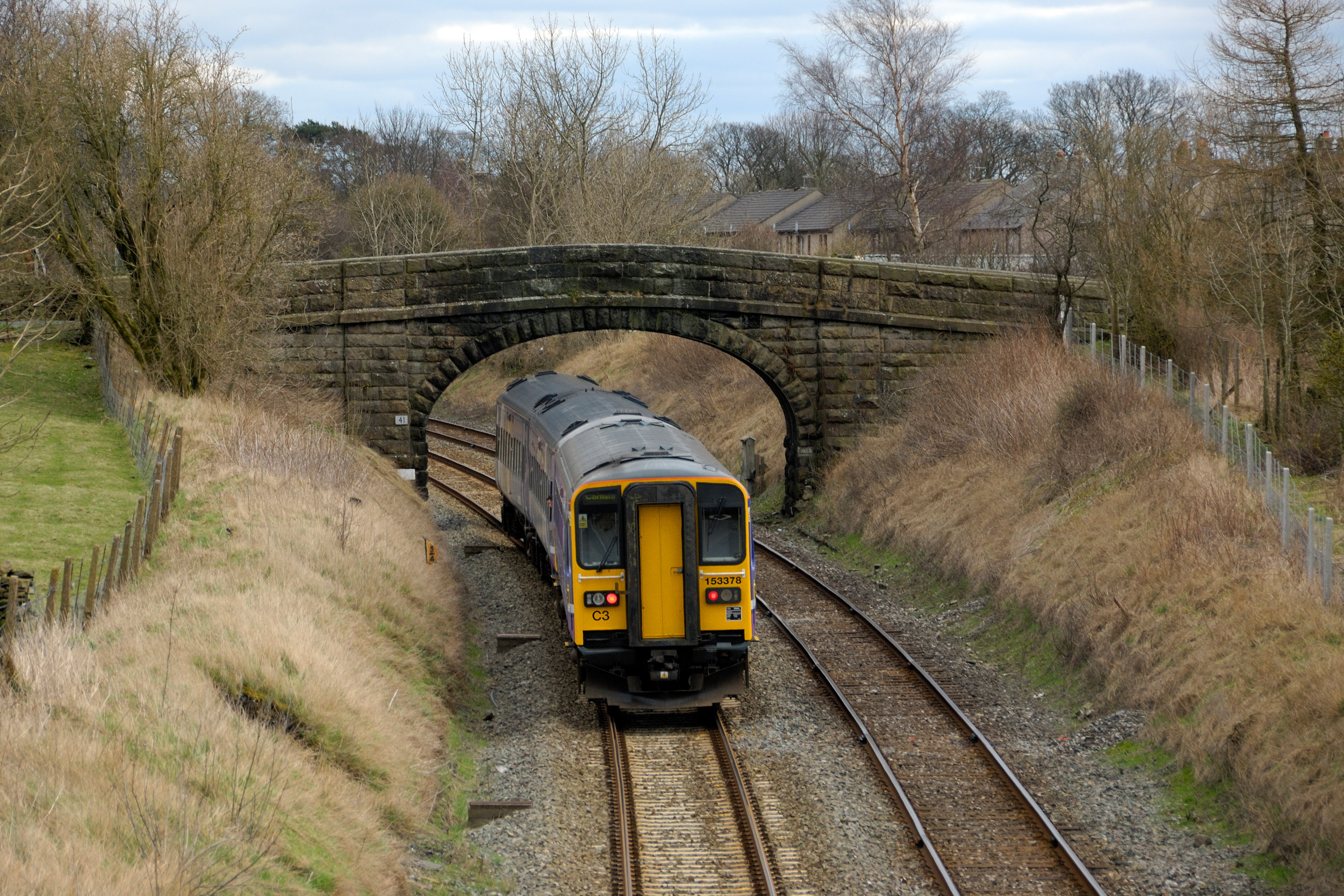
- A British Rail Class 158 and a British Rail Class 153 heading south at Long Preston (the type of traction used on DalesRail services)

Overview
- Service type: Seasonal; Tourist
- Locale: Northern/North West England
- First service: 1974
- Current operator(s): Northern Trains
- Former operator(s): British Rail Provincial, 1974–1982; Regional Railways, 1982–1997; First North Western, 1997–2004; Northern Rail, 2004–2016; Arriva Rail North, 2016–2020
- Website: Community Rail webpage

Route
- Termini: Blackpool North; Carlisle
- Stops: 21
- Service frequency: Twice-daily (Summer only)
- Line(s) used: Blackpool line East Lancashire line Ribble Valley line Settle & Carlisle line

Technical
- Track gauge: 4 ft 8 1/2 in (1,435 mm)

DalesRail is a railway passenger service operated for tourism in the summer months across Cumbria, Lancashire and North Yorkshire, England. The service routinely uses the current freight-only line between Clitheroe and Hellifield, offering the opportunity to travel on a line rarely used by passenger trains. The trains then also traverse the full length of the Settle & Carlisle line. The DalesRail brand has also been used on the Wensleydale Line in the 1970s and 1980s, before that line reopened as a heritage railway.

DalesRail customers were part of the campaign to save the Settle–Carlisle line from closure, and initially used stations that were closed to passengers in 1970. With the re-opening of most stations on that line, the DalesRail brand continues with services from Blackpool and Preston to Carlisle via Clitheroe and Hellifield.

== History ==
The DalesRail service started in 1974, when a group of ramblers complained that British Rail were not affording them the opportunity to use the train to go fell-walking in the Lancashire and Yorkshire Dales or the Eden Valley, as only the stations at Settle and Appleby were open to the public (the other stations on the line had been closed in 1970). The venture was a success, and led to several other stations on the Settle-Carlisle line being reopened from May 1975 to service the DalesRail train. (Note: Stations north of Appleby (Langwathby, Lazonby and Armathwaite) were reopened in April 1976.) The Settle–Carlisle Line was being progressively rundown during the 1970s, and with the introduction of DalesRail, the Yorkshire Dales National Park Committee were hoping to increase the number of people using the train. Initially, the first services were between Leeds and Appleby calling at Horton-in-Ribblesdale, Ribblehead (southbound only), Dent and Kirkby Stephen. These were integrated with a local bus service which would take people living in the dales to the stations (such as at Garsdale) and they would get into the trains that the tourist had vacated, with the DalesRail train then going back to Leeds or Bradford. This allowed the residents of the Dales a day out shopping, and meant revenue was increased as tickets were charged in two directions, so costs were then kept to a minimum.

The following year, services were run from Manchester and Colne, with some being extended all the way to Carlisle. In 1977, the stations in the upper Eden valley were re-opened for occasional use (Langwathby, Lazonby, and Armathwaite). Initially, the project was funded jointly by the Yorkshire Dales Committee and the West Yorkshire Passenger Transport Executive (WYPTE). Fears of over-ordering stock from British Rail, led to the WYPTE using fewer carriages on DalesRail services in an effort to fill the trains rather than have spare seats. In order to maximise this, the WYPTE took over marketing the service. As the project gained momentum, so other official bodies gave support, with Cumbria County Council, Eden District Council and the Countryside Commission who appointed a project officer.

DalesRail was extended into an excursion service which visited the Wensleydale Line in the 1970s. The first service was in 1977, with Bedale, Finghall, and Leyburn being used as alighting and embarkation points. Services ran from Leeds and York to Redmire in September each year until 1981, whilst a service originating in Newcastle and running in June, actually took passengers from Wensleydale back to Tyneside for a day out.

The main services have however, always been focussed on the Settle–Carlisle line, with services running from Leeds to Carlisle, and Preston to Hellifield via Clitheroe on a Saturday. This allowed the two services to connect at Hellifield. Sundays consisted of services between Leeds and Appleby. Use of the line through Clitheroe first occurred in 1978, and the success led to a small number of Christmas shopping specials run during weekends in December.

Other services were extended to other lines with some trains from Carlisle running to and from Bradford Forster Square, and by 1981, 6,000 people used the service when it ran over several weekends of that year. By 1985, this number had dropped slightly to 5,000, though between its inception in 1974 to 1983, the service had carried an estimated 70,000 passengers. As the rundown of the Settle–Carlisle line continued, the last express trains using the line were withdrawn in 1982 (Glasgow to Nottingham). Initially, those objecting to the closure plans were mainly those who lived in the communities along the line, but this was later extended to anyone who used the DalesRail or excursion services.

The service has been labelled as "pioneering", as it is seen as a backbone for an integrated transport network in a large rural area. Many co-ordinated guided walks and local buses are timed to connect with the DalesRail trains on a Sunday, affording people the opportunity to travel to destinations away from the railway, such as Hawes, Leyburn and the lower Wensleydale valley into Northallerton.

Whilst the service runs every year (usually on 17 Sundays across the summer and autumn) the service suffered severe disruption after the introduction of the reformed timetable in May 2018, which was compounded by a strike by staff at Arriva Rail North. The service was suspended in 2020 due to the COVID-19 pandemic. The service was due to run one daily train on a Sunday between Blackpool and Carlisle, until early September, when the train would only travel as far from Blackpool as Hellifield. The service restarted from the 16 May 2021 timetable change with the guided walks programme restarting from 6 June 2021, however, it was only carrying 1,000 people annually.

The 2023 service was announced as being cancelled completely in March 2023, due to the lack of available staff from Northern to run the trains.

In 2024, Northern announced that the service would be brought back in the form of two daily trains each way on Saturdays between Ribblehead and Rochdale. This modified service would begin on 8 June 2024 and was renamed the Yorkshire Dales Explorer. These are services that usually run between Rochdale and Blackburn on weekdays, extended to run through to Hellifield, Settle and Ribblehead (where connections can be made for stations further north).

== Traction ==
In the 1970s and 1980s, British Rail used a mixture of first generation DMU stock such as classes 108. During the 1990s and 2000s onwards, Sprinters and Pacers have been used, but Class 156 units have been the most common, with one even being named Lancashire DalesRail.
