= Langho railway station =

Railway station in Lancashire, England

Langho
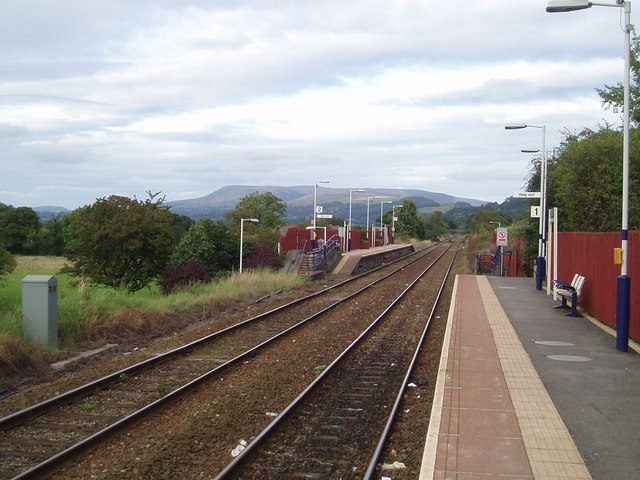

General information
- Location: Langho, Ribble Valley; England
- Coordinates: 53.805°N 2.448°W
- Grid reference: SD705343
- Manager: Northern Trains
- Platforms: 2

Other information
- Station code: LHO
- Classification: DfT category F2

History
- Original company: Bolton, Blackburn, Clitheroe and West Yorkshire Railway
- Pre-grouping: Lancashire and Yorkshire Railway
- Post-grouping: London Midland and Scottish Railway

Key dates
- 22 June 1850: Opened
- 7 May 1956: Closed
- 29 May 1994: Reopened

Passengers
- 2021/22: ▲33,688
- 2022/23: ▲39,650
- 2023/24: ▼37,956
- 2024/25: ▼36,914
- 2025/26: ▲38,482
Location
Notes
- Passenger statistics from the Office of Rail and Road

Langho railway station serves the village of Langho in the Ribble Valley in Lancashire, England. The station is 5 1/4 miles (8.4 km) north of Blackburn.

It is one of four railway stations along the Ribble Valley Line from Blackburn to Clitheroe reopened in 1994 by British Rail and Lancashire County Council, having been closed by the British Railways as an economy measure in 1956, six years before the local passenger service over the line ceased. The station has maintained transport links with existing bus services and has its services provided by Northern Trains.

== Facilities ==
The station is unstaffed and has no ticketing provision, so these must be bought on the train or in advance of travel. The two platforms are staggered, either side of the pedestrian underpass that links them (the Clitheroe-bound one being the more northerly of the two); the original station had its platforms opposite one another but the building of new housing prevented this arrangement from being used for its replacement. Shelters are provided on each platform, along with timetable poster boards and customer help point. Running information is also made available by automatic announcements and telephone. No step-free access is possible, as the platforms are above street level and only reached via stairs.

== Services ==
There is generally an hourly service daily northbound to Clitheroe and southbound to Blackburn and Manchester Victoria with extra trains during peak hours.

On Saturdays (June 2024 onwards) two trains operate from Rochdale through Manchester Victoria and along the Ribble Valley Line via Clitheroe and Hellifield and onwards towards Ribblehead. (This replaces the previous Dales Rail service from Blackpool/Preston to Hellifield and Carlisle).

Preceding station	National Rail	Following station
Whalley	Northern Trains; Ribble Valley Line	Ramsgreave and Wilpshire
