= Ramsgreave and Wilpshire railway station =

Railway station in Lancashire, England

Ramsgreave & Wilpshire
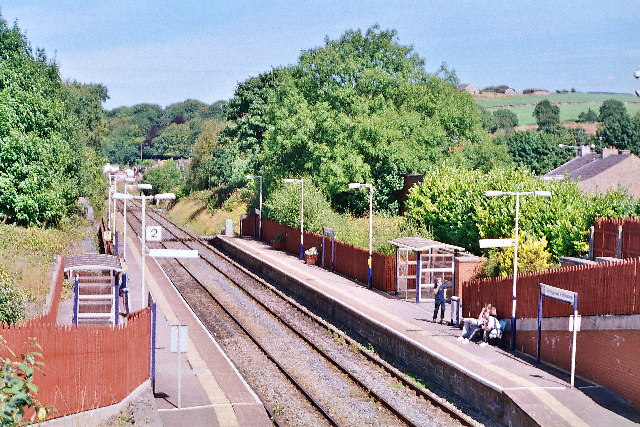

General information
- Location: Ramsgreave, Ribble Valley; England
- Coordinates: 53.780°N 2.478°W
- Grid reference: SD 686 316
- Managed by: Northern Trains
- Line: Ribble Valley line
- Platforms: 2

Other information
- Station code: RGW
- Classification: DfT category F2

History
- Original company: Bolton, Blackburn, Clitheroe and West Yorkshire Railway
- Pre-grouping: Lancashire and Yorkshire Railway
- Post-grouping: London, Midland and Scottish Railway

Key dates
- 22 June 1850: Opened as Ribchester
- 1874: Renamed as Wilpshire
- 1899: Renamed as Wilpshire for Ribchester
- 10 September 1962: Closed for passengers
- 2 November 1964: Closed for freight
- 29 May 1994: Reopened as Ramsgreave and Wilpshire

Passengers
- 2020/21: ▼37,484
- 2021/22: ▲96,952
- 2022/23: ▲0.104 million
- 2023/24: ▼96,334
- 2024/25: ▼91,780
Location
Notes
- Passenger statistics from the Office of Rail and Road

Ramsgreave and Wilpshire is a railway station on the Ribble Valley Line that serves the villages/suburbs of Ramsgreave and Wilpshire. The station is 2 3/4 miles (4.4 km) north of Blackburn railway station.

== History ==
There have been two stations serving the Ramsgreave and Wilpshire area.

=== First station ===
The first station, opened as Ribchester, despite being more than 3 miles (4.8 km) away from that village, on 22 June 1850 when the Bolton, Blackburn, Clitheroe and West Yorkshire Railway (BBC&WYR) opened its single track line between Blackburn and Chatburn. (Note: The BBC&WYR shortened its name to the Blackburn Railway in 1851, and this company was jointly acquired by the Lancashire and Yorkshire Railway and East Lancashire Railway in 1858, these two companies then amalgamated in 1859 leaving the station belonging to the Lancashire and Yorkshire Railway.)

The track through the station was doubled on 16 February 1874.

The station was located off Whalley Road (formerley Whalley New Road, now the A666), between the villages of Ramsgreave and Wilpshire, the station had two wooden platforms connected with a footbridge, the main buildings, containg the booking office, waiting room and toilets were on the east side of the line accessed via a drive and footpath. The other platform had a wood and glass shelter. The northern end of the platforms had footpaths leading down to a subway allowing pedestrian access from both sides of the line.

On the eastern side there was a goods yard able to accommodate most types of goods including live stock, it was equipped with a three ton crane.

The wooden platforms were replaced with concrete ones in May 1954.

The line and station closed to passengers on 10 September 1962, except for one Manchester to Glasgow service on summer Saturday mornings which was also withdrawn from 15 August 1964. The line remained open for freight and diversions with the station closing for freight on 2 November 1964.

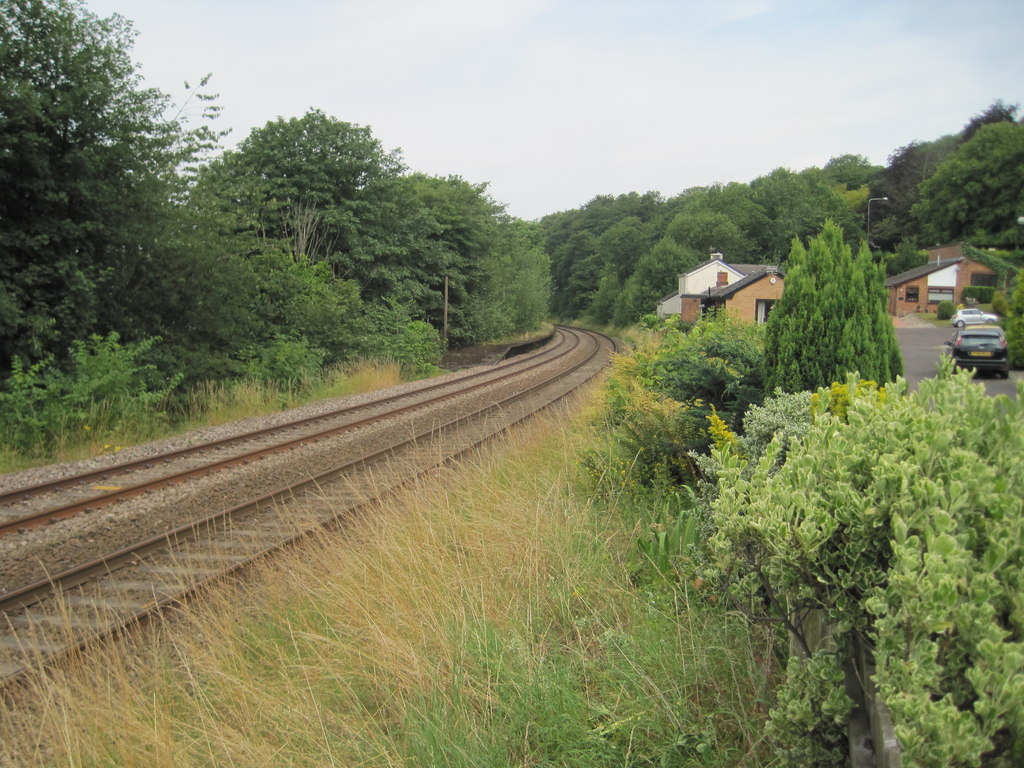
Site of first station with platform

=== Second station ===
The line between Blackburn and Clitheroe re-opened for passengers in 1994, access to the first station site was no longer viable as houses had been constructed in the way. A new station was built 400 yards (370 m) south of the first station, opening on 29 May 1994 as Ramsgreave and Wilpshire.

Access is from Ramsgreave Road with a car park on the opposite side of the road.

== Facilities ==
The station is unstaffed, but has a ticket machine on the south platform, as of 2020. There are waiting shelters and customer help points on each platform; automatic announcements also provide real-time train running information. The ramps to both platforms have steps, so no step-free access is available.

== Services ==
The station is operated by Northern Trains, and is served by a daily hourly service northbound to Clitheroe and southbound to Blackburn and Manchester Victoria, with extra trains during the morning peak.

On Saturdays (June 2024 onwards) two trains operate from Rochdale through Manchester Victoria and along the Ribble Valley Line via Clitheroe and Hellifield and onwards towards Ribblehead. (This replaces the previous Dales Rail service from Blackpool/Preston to Hellifield and Carlisle).

Preceding station	National Rail	Following station
Langho	Northern Trains; Ribble Valley Line	Blackburn
	Disused railways	
Langho; Line and station open	Lancashire and Yorkshire Railway; Blackburn Railway	Daisyfield; Line open, station closed

== Bibliography ==
- Bradshaw, George (1951). Bradshaw's Guide to the British Railways: July 1951 (PDF). henry Blacklock.
- Clinker, C. R. (October 1978). Clinker's Register of Closed Passenger Stations and Goods Depots in England, Scotland and Wales 1830–1977. Bristol: Avon-Anglia Publications & Services. ISBN 0-905466-19-5. OCLC 5726624.
- Grant, Donald J. (2017). Directory of the Railway Companies of Great Britain (1st ed.). Kibworth Beauchamp, Leicestershire: Troubador Publishing Ltd. ISBN 978-1-78803-768-6.
- Marshall, John (1969). The Lancashire & Yorkshire Railway. Vol. 1. Newton Abbot: David & Charles. ISBN 978-0-7153-4352-4.
- Matthews, John (2016). Mitchell, Vic (ed.). Blackburn to Hellifield: The Ribble Valley Line. Midhurst, West Sussex: Middleton Press. ISBN 9781908174956. OCLC 1301800848.
- Quick, Michael (2023) [2001]. Railway passenger stations in Great Britain: a chronology (PDF). version 5.05. Railway & Canal Historical Society.
- The Railway Clearing House (1970) [1904]. The Railway Clearing House Handbook of Railway Stations 1904 (1970 D&C Reprint ed.). Newton Abbot: David & Charles Reprints. ISBN 0-7153-5120-6.
