= Kirkby Stephen railway station =

Railway station in Cumbria, England

Kirkby Stephen
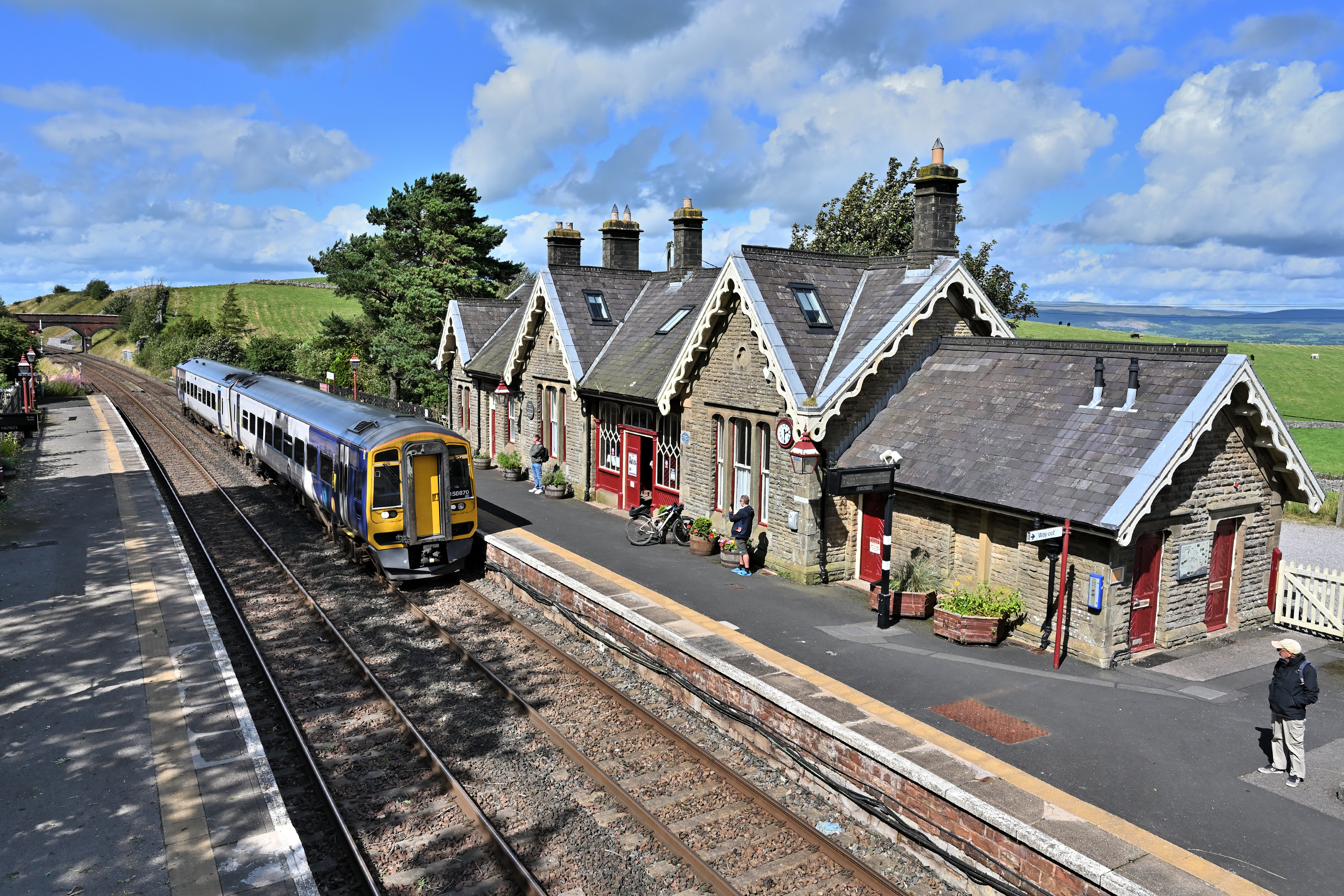

General information
- Location: Kirkby Stephen, Westmorland and Furness; England
- Coordinates: 54°27′18″N 2°22′07″W
- Grid reference: NY762066
- Owner: Network Rail
- Manager: Northern Trains
- Platforms: 2
- Tracks: 2

Other information
- Station code: KSW
- Classification: DfT category F2

History
- Original company: Midland Railway
- Pre-grouping: Midland Railway
- Post-grouping: London, Midland and Scottish Railway; British Rail (London Midland Region)

Key dates
- 1 May 1876: Opened as Kirkby Stephen
- 1 October 1900: Renamed Kirkby Stephen and Ravenstonedale
- 8 June 1953: Renamed Kirkby Stephen West
- 6 May 1968: Renamed Kirkby Stephen
- 4 May 1970: Closed
- 14 July 1986: Reopened

Passengers
- 2021/22: ▲25,758
- 2022/23: ▲29,888
- 2023/24: ▲33,666
- 2024/25: ▲35,744
- 2025/26: ▲39,316

Services
Preceding station	Northern	Following station
Garsdale towards Leeds via Settle	Settle and Carlisle Line	Appleby towards Carlisle
Location
- Location within the former Eden District Location within Cumbria
Notes
- Passenger statistics from the Office of Rail and Road

Kirkby Stephen is a railway station in Cumbria, England, on the Settle and Carlisle Line, which runs between Carlisle and Leeds via Settle. The station is situated 1.5 miles (2.4 km) south-west of the market town of Kirkby Stephen, just within the civil parish of Wharton, and also serves the nearby villages of Newbiggin-on-Lune and Ravenstonedale. It lies 41 miles 35 chains (66.7 km) south of Carlisle, and is owned by Network Rail and managed by Northern Trains.

== History ==
The station was designed by the Midland Railway company architect John Holloway Sanders, and opened to traffic in May 1876.

The station is more than 1 1/4 miles (2 km) from the town (and over 150 feet (46 m) above it) at Midland Hill, just within the civil parish of Wharton. It was opened as Kirkby Stephen, but it was renamed Kirkby Stephen and Ravenstonedale in 1900, and then Kirkby Stephen West in 1953, to avoid confusion with the older Kirkby Stephen, later known as Kirkby Stephen East, station in the town, on the North Eastern Railway's Stainmore and Eden Valley lines. Its remote location was necessitated by the Midland Railway's desire to keep gradients on the line to no greater than 1 in 100 for fast running. Had it been any closer to the town, the climb up to the summit of the line at Ais Gill would have exceeded this limit considerably. The West station reverted to the name Kirkby Stephen in 1968, but was closed (along with all other stations on the line except Settle and Appleby) in May 1970. It was reopened by British Rail in July 1986.

The station is leased by the Settle and Carlisle Railway Trust, which comprehensively restored it in 2009. The main buildings on platform 1 now incorporate a caretaker's flat, offices, holiday accommodation and the Midland Room, opened in July 2011, which includes a cafe and exhibition of items related to the Settle and Carlisle railway. Platform 2 (northbound) has a stone shelter. The old goods shed to the south is now in private commercial use, goods facilities having been withdrawn here in 1964.

Step-free access to both platforms is available (ramps to platform 2 from the road below), along with a footbridge (erected in the mid-1990s after becoming redundant at its original location at Guiseley). A new ticket machine has recently been installed on the up platform. Buses to and from the town call close to the station entrance on the A685 road to Kendal.

== Services ==
The station is served by eight trains in each direction on weekdays and Saturdays: northbound to Carlisle and southbound to Leeds. A new early morning Monday to Friday service southbound began in May 2011. The first weekday northbound service now runs through from Leeds, rather than arriving from Carlisle and returning there after a reversal as before.

There are six departures each way on Sundays throughout the year, including a through train to and from Nottingham. DalesRail services between Blackpool North/Preston and Carlisle used to call at the station on summer Sundays, but this service stopped running in 2023. A replacement Saturday service from Rochdale via Manchester Victoria marketed as the "Yorkshire Dales Explorer" started from the summer 2024 timetable. However, this will terminate/start at Ribblehead further to the south and passengers will need to change there or at Settle to get to Kirkby Stephen.

Preceding station	National Rail	Following station
Garsdale	Northern Trains; Settle and Carlisle Line	Appleby
	Historical railways	
Garsdale	Midland Railway; Settle and Carlisle Line	Crosby Garrett
