= Whalley railway station =

Railway station in Lancashire, England

Coordinates: 53.824°N 2.412°W

Whalley
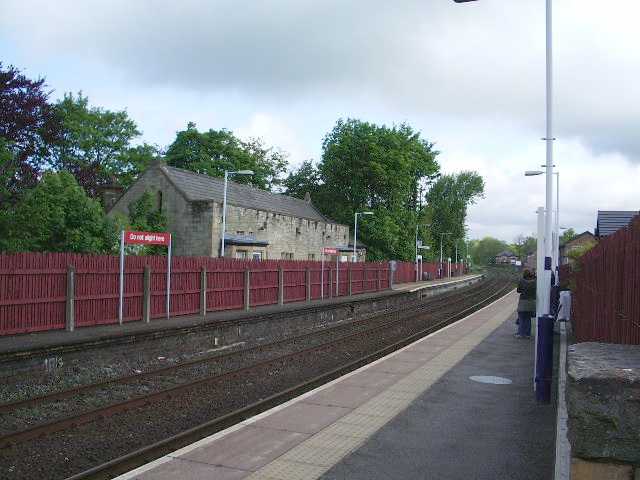

General information
- Location: Whalley, Ribble Valley; England
- Grid reference: SD729365
- Managed by: Northern Trains
- Platforms: 2

Other information
- Station code: WHE
- Classification: DfT category F2

History
- Opened: Original: June 22, 1850; 176 years ago Reopened: May 1994; 32 years ago

Passengers
- 2020/21: ▼20,146
- 2021/22: ▲73,962
- 2022/23: ▲84,176
- 2023/24: ▼77,862
- 2024/25: ▲81,118
Location
Notes
- Passenger statistics from the Office of Rail and Road

Whalley railway station serves the village of Whalley in Lancashire, England. The station lies on the Ribble Valley Line 7 1/4 miles (11.7 km) north of Blackburn. The station has two platforms, slightly offset from each other. It is unstaffed, with shelters on each platform. Immediately beyond its eastern end, the line crosses the River Calder on a 678-yard (620 m) long, brick viaduct of 48 arches.

== History ==
The station was opened on 22 June 1850 by the Bolton, Blackburn, Clitheroe and West Yorkshire Railway when it opened the line from Daisyfield, near Blackburn to Hellifield Junction, just south of Hellifield. The station was host to a LMS caravan from 1934 to 1936.

It was closed on 10 September 1962 by the British Transport Commission and reopened with the rest of the line on 29 May 1994.

== Facilities ==
There is a Ticket Vending Machine on the Manchester platform. However, there are customer help points on both platforms, automated train running announcements and timetable information posters are provided. Step free access is only available on the Manchester bound platform.

== Services ==
There is generally an hourly service daily (including Sundays) northbound to Clitheroe and southbound to Blackburn, Bolton, and Manchester Victoria; and on to Rochdale, with extra trains during peak hours. Sunday trains start/terminate at Manchester Victoria. On Saturdays (June 2024 onwards), two trains operate from Rochdale through Manchester Victoria and along the Ribble Valley Line via Clitheroe and Hellifield and onwards towards Ribblehead. (This replaces the previous Dales Rail service from Blackpool/Preston to Hellifield and Carlisle).

Preceding station	National Rail	Following station
Clitheroe	Northern Trains; Ribble Valley Line	Langho
