= Langwathby railway station =

Railway station in Cumbria, England

Langwathby
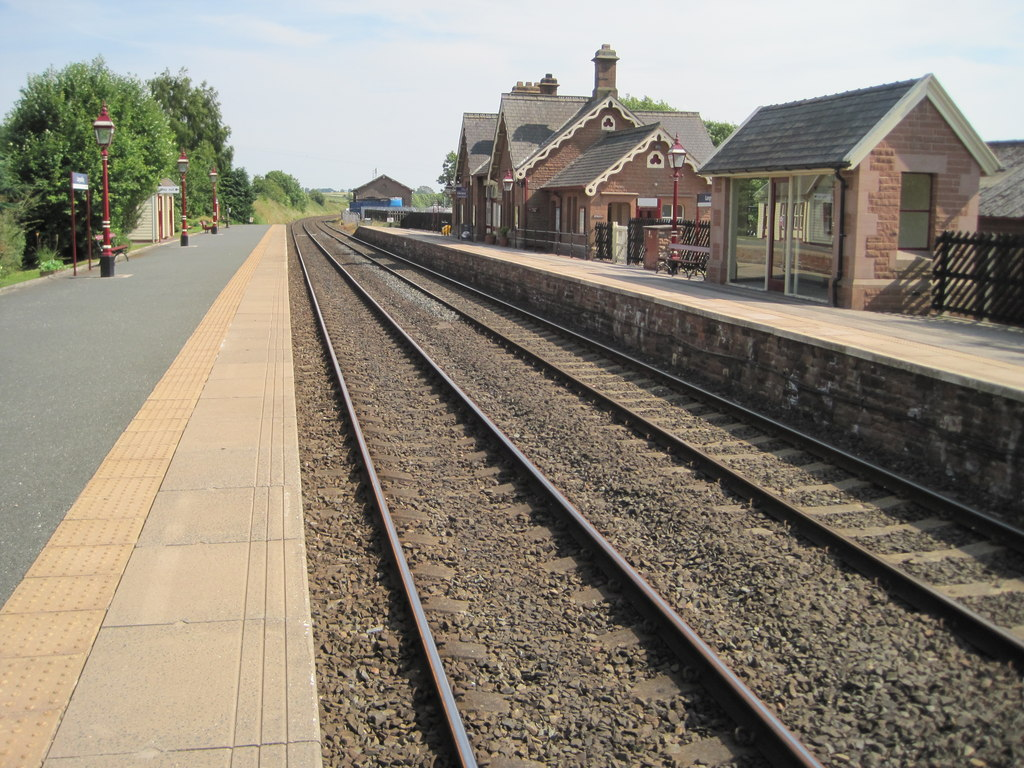

General information
- Location: Langwathby, Westmorland and Furness; England
- Coordinates: 54°41′40″N 2°39′49″W
- Grid reference: NY573334
- Owner: Network Rail
- Manager: Northern Trains
- Platforms: 2
- Tracks: 2

Other information
- Station code: LGW
- Classification: DfT category F2

History
- Original company: Midland Railway
- Pre-grouping: Midland Railway
- Post-grouping: London, Midland and Scottish Railway; British Rail (London Midland Region)

Key dates
- 1 May 1876: Opened as Longwathby
- 1 October 1876: Renamed Langwathby
- 4 May 1970: Closed
- 14 July 1986: Reopened

Passengers
- 2021/22: ▲17,168
- 2022/23: ▼16,712
- 2023/24: ▲19,066
- 2024/25: ▲20,288
- 2025/26: ▲25,302

Services
Preceding station	Northern	Following station
Appleby towards Leeds via Settle	Settle and Carlisle Line	Lazonby & Kirkoswald towards Carlisle
Location
- Location within the former Eden District Location within Cumbria
Notes
- Passenger statistics from the Office of Rail and Road

Langwathby is a railway station on the Settle and Carlisle Line, which runs between Carlisle and Leeds via Settle. The station, situated 19 miles 59 chains (31.8 km) south-east of Carlisle, serves the village of Langwathby in Cumbria, England. It is owned by Network Rail and managed by Northern Trains.

== History ==
The station was built by the Midland Railway and opened in 1876. The station was designed by the Midland Railway company architect John Holloway Sanders. It closed when local stopping trains over the Settle-Carlisle Line were withdrawn in May 1970, but was reopened by British Rail in July 1986.

=== Stationmasters ===
- Joseph Shaw 1876 - 1884
- Thomas Wakefield 1884 – 1890 (afterwards station master at Lazonby)
- Oliver John Haddock 1890 – 1892
- William Dickinson 1892 - ca. 191
- Robert James Tinsley from 1959 (also station master at Little Salkeld)

== Facilities ==
The Carlisle-bound (down) station building has been converted into the Brief Encounter Tea Rooms and an antique shop. An enclosed bus-shelter style waiting room has been provided at the Carlisle end of the platform (a stone shelter is also present on the Leeds-bound platform). Step-free access is available to both platforms via ramps from the road below. The station is unstaffed. Tickets can be bought at the station from a vending machine installed in 2019. Train running information is available via timetable posters, digital information screens (also installed in 2019) or telephone.

== Accidents and incidents ==
- On 29 November 1912, goods guard R.Mallinson’s hand was crushed during shunting operations in the goods yard. He attempted to couple two waggons with his shunting pole when he slipped on some snow.
- On 6 March 1930, a passenger train, hauled by Ex-LNWR Claughton 4-6-0 No. 5971, departed from Culgaith station against signals and was in collision with a ballast train, hauled by Midland Railway 3835 Class 0-6-0 No. 4009. Two people were killed and four were seriously injured.

== Services ==
Eight northbound and seven southbound services call at Langwathby on weekdays and five trains in each direction on Sundays. The station was also served by a single DalesRail train from Preston & Blackpool North to Carlisle (and return) on Sundays during the summer months (but this is currently suspended until spring 2024). One additional call each way was instituted at the summer 2018 timetable change as part of DfT-mandated Northern franchise improvements.

Services through to Carlisle were suspended from 9 February 2016 (until March 2017) by a landslip at Eden Brow (near Armathwaite), which destabilised the embankment on the eastern side of the railway where it passes through the Eden Gorge. An emergency timetable was in operation, with trains only operating as far as Armathwaite (with a bus link to Carlisle) northbound and Appleby southbound until repairs were completed in the spring of 2017. Following the successful completion of the repair work, the regular timetable resumed on 31 March 2017.

Preceding station	National Rail	Following station
Appleby	Northern Trains; Settle and Carlisle Line	Lazonby and Kirkoswald
	Historical railways	
Culgaith	Midland Railway; Settle and Carlisle Line	Little Salkeld
