= Clitheroe Interchange =

Bus station in Lancashire, England

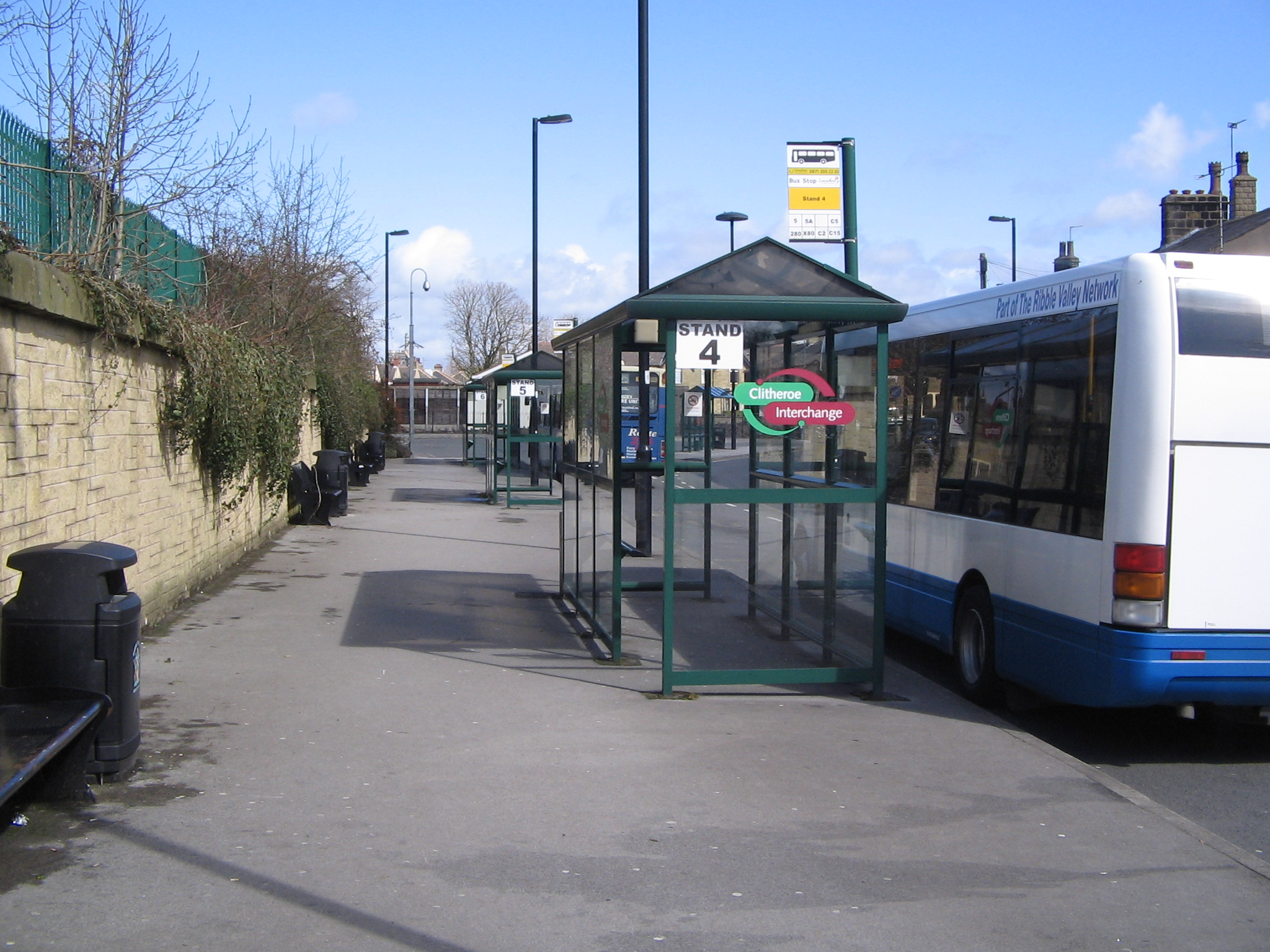
- The bus stands at Clitheroe Interchange

General information
- Location: Railway View Road, Clitheroe; Ribble Valley
- Coordinates: 53.8741°N 2.3931°W
- Operator: Lancashire County Council
- Connections: Clitheroe railway station (adjacent)

History
- Opened: 2000; 26 years ago
Location
- Location within the Borough of Ribble Valley

Clitheroe Interchange is the main transport interchange in the market town of Clitheroe and the Ribble Valley district in Lancashire, England. It consists of several bus stops, Clitheroe railway station and a coach parking space. It is operated and maintained by Lancashire County Council. All trains are run by Northern. The ticket and information office permanently closed on 5 February 2020 due to a loss in funding.

== Location ==
The interchange is located in the north west of Clitheroe, near the town centre. It is near the Platform Gallery, Maxwell's restaurant, Dawsons department store, the Inn at the Station and Booths supermarket.

== Bus services ==
Bus services are operated by The Blackburn Bus Company, The Burnley Bus Company, Stagecoach, Vision Bus, Preston Bus, and North Yorkshire Council whose routes serve many of the surrounding major towns and a number of the smaller rural villages.

== Rail Services ==
- Northern run services to Rochdale via Blackburn and Manchester Victoria
- Since June 2024 Northern has run an amended service, operating Saturdays only. This sees two return trips from Rochdale extended beyond Clitheroe up to Ribblehead. This is branded as the Yorkshire Dales Explorer.
