= Wilpshire =

Village in Lancashire, England

Coordinates: 53.787°N 2.476°W

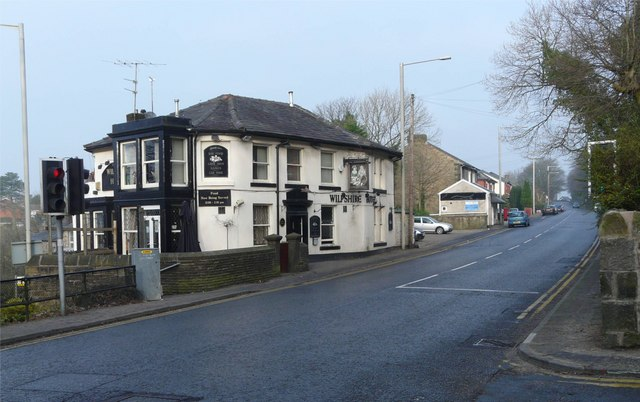
- The Wilpshire Hotel public house

- Shown within Ribble Valley Location within Lancashire
- Population: 2,582 (2011 Census)
- OS grid reference: SD685315
- Civil parish: Wilpshire
- District: Ribble Valley
- Shire county: Lancashire
- Region: North West
- Country: England
- Sovereign state: United Kingdom
- Post town: BLACKBURN
- Postcode district: BB1
- Dialling code: 01254
- Police: Lancashire
- Fire: Lancashire
- Ambulance: North West
- UK Parliament: Ribble Valley

Wilpshire is a village and civil parish in the county of Lancashire, England. It is 3 miles (4.8 km) north of Blackburn, and forms part of the town's urban area, although it is in the Ribble Valley local government district. In the 2001 United Kingdom census, the parish had a population of 2,569, increasing to 2,582 at the 2011 Census.

The village is situated on the A666 Whalley Road, between the Brownhill area of Blackburn and the village of Langho. The local railway station is Ramsgreave and Wilpshire, on the Ribble Valley Line with train services to Blackburn, Manchester and Clitheroe.

The only pub in the village is the Wilpshire Hotel, formerly known as The Red House.

Wilpshire Golf Club is a private golf club in the village, was founded in 1890. Originally it was a nine-hole course but extended to an eighteen-hole course in 1907. James Braid was commissioned to redesign the course. Most of the reconstruction took place before 1924. In 1995 the course was altered by a new 17th hole.

== Notable people ==
- Dame Dorothy Elizabeth 'Betty' Ackroyd (1910–1987), civil servant and first director of the Consumer Council, which ran from 1963 to 1971.
- Peter Doyle (born 1944), the retired Roman Catholic Bishop of Northampton.
