= Westmorland and Furness =

District in Cumbria, England

- Unitary authority area
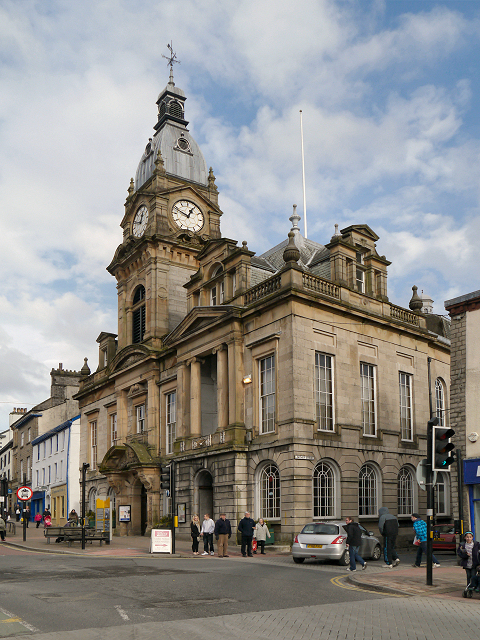
- Kendal Town Hall, part of the headquarters of Westmorland and Furness Council

- Westmorland and Furness shown within Cumbria
- Interactive map of Westmorland and Furness
- Coordinates: 54.326°N 2.745°W
- Sovereign state: United Kingdom
- Country: England
- Region: North West
- Ceremonial county: Cumbria
- Historic county: Westmorland; Lancashire (part); Cumberland (part); Yorkshire (part)
- Incorporated: 1 April 2023
- Named for: Westmorland and Furness
- Administrative HQ: Kendal

Government
  - Type: Unitary authority
  - Body: Westmorland and Furness Council
  - Executive: Leader and cabinet
  - Control: Liberal Democrats
  - Leader: Jonathan Brook (LD)
  - Chairman: Matt Severn
  - MPs: 4 MPs: Tim Farron (LD); Markus Campbell-Savours (L); Michelle Scrogham (L); Lizzi Collinge (L)

Area
  - Total: 1,450 sq mi (3,756 km^{2})
  - Rank: 3rd

Population (2025)
  - Total: 231,307
  - Rank: 84th
  - Density: 160/sq mi (62/km^{2})
- Time zone: UTC+0 (GMT)
  - Summer (DST): UTC+1 (BST)
- Postcode areas: CA; LA
- GSS code: E06000064
- Website: westmorlandandfurness.gov.uk

Westmorland and Furness is a unitary authority area in the ceremonial county of Cumbria, England. It covers Westmorland, the Furness peninsula, and the areas around Penrith and Sedbergh. It is bordered by Cumberland to the north and west, Northumberland, County Durham and North Yorkshire to the east, and the City of Lancaster district of Lancashire to the south. Its largest town is Barrow-in-Furness and its administrative centre is Kendal.

The unitary authority area was formed on 1 April 2023 during local government restructuring which saw the abolition of the former non-metropolitan county of Cumbria and its six districts; Westmorland and Furness has the same area as the former districts of Barrow-in-Furness, Eden, and South Lakeland. It remains part of Cumbria for ceremonial purposes. Prior to the local government reforms of 1974, the area was split between the counties of Westmorland, Cumberland, Lancashire and Yorkshire.

Westmorland and Furness is a single-tier local government area, being both a non-metropolitan county and district. Its sole local authority is Westmorland and Furness Council, which provides the services of both a county council and a district council. The first elections to the new authority took place in May 2022, with Westmorland and Furness Council acting as a "shadow authority" until the abolition of Cumbria County Council and the three district councils on 1 April 2023.

The economy is mainly focused on tourism around both the Lake District and Cumbria Coast, shipbuilding and the Royal Port of Barrow, and agriculture in the rural parts of the area.

== Background ==
Elections to Cumbria County Council were due to take place in May 2021; however, they were postponed for one year by the Secretary of State for Housing, Communities and Local Government due to a consultation on local government reorganisation in the area. In July 2021, the government announced that the current authorities in Cumbria would be abolished and replaced with two unitary authorities, with an east/west split of the county.

Opponents of the reorganisation claimed that the proposal was being pursued to benefit the electoral prospects of the Conservative Party. Cumbria County Council, which would be abolished under the plans, sought judicial review to prevent the reorganisation from taking place. The judicial review was refused by the High Court in January 2022. Draft statutory instruments to bring about local government reorganisation in Cumbria were subsequently laid before parliament. The Cumbria (Structural Changes) Order 2022 (2022 No. 331) was made on 17 March 2022, and came into force the following day.

The name of the unitary authority derives from the county of Westmorland and the peninsula of Furness. Westmorland was previously an administrative county until it was abolished by the Local Government Act 1972 and became part of the new county of Cumbria. Furness was part of the administrative county of Lancashire until 1974; together with the Cartmel Peninsula, it formed an exclave of that county, historically part of the Lonsdale Hundred of Lancashire known as North Lonsdale or Lancashire North of the Sands. In addition to those areas, the district includes part of the historic county of Cumberland in the Penrith area and an area centred on Sedbergh, which was part of the West Riding of Yorkshire.

== Geography ==
The territory of Westmorland and Furness includes parts of the Lake District National Park and the Yorkshire Dales and its national park. The Westmorland Dales form part of the latter national park.

The major settlements and civil parishes within the boundaries of Westmorland and Furness are:

- Alston Moor
- Ambleside
- Appleby-in-Westmorland
- Arnside
- Askam and Ireleth
- Barrow-in-Furness
- Beetham
- Coniston
- Dalton
- Grasmere
- Hawkshead
- Kendal
- Kirkby Lonsdale
- Kirkby Stephen
- Kirkoswald
- Milnthorpe
- Penrith
- Sedbergh
- Shap
- Ulverston
- Walney Island
- Windermere

Neighbouring council areas
Local authority	In relation to the district
Cumberland	North
Northumberland	North east
County Durham	East
North Yorkshire	South east
Lancaster	South

=== Town and country planning ===
The planning system of England applies to Westmorland and Furness. As of October 2025, the local plans in force remain those prepared by the former districts of the area, except in the national parks, which have separate local plans. In 2024, Westmorland and Furness Council commenced preparing a new district-wide local plan to replace the three previous local plans.

== Politics ==
Westmorland and Furness was established by The Cumbria (Structural Changes) Order 2022. It is both a non-metropolitan county and non-metropolitan district.

Westmorland and Furness Council has 65 councillors, and the first election to the local authority was in May 2022. At that election the Liberal Democrats secured a majority on the incoming council with 36 out of 65 councillors. Labour have 15 councillors, the Conservatives have 11 councillors, the Green Party have 1 councillor and 2 councillors were elected as independents.

Affiliation	Members
Liberal Democrats	36
Labour Party	15
Conservative Party	11
Independent	2
Green Party	1

Westmorland and Furness, together with neighbouring Cumberland, constitute a ceremonial county named Cumbria for the purpose of lieutenancy and shrievalties, being presided over by a Lord Lieutenant of Cumbria and a High Sheriff of Cumbria. Ceremonial counties do not discharge any administrative function. The Government consulted on establishing a Cumbria Combined Authority in 2025, which would comprise Westmorland and Furness Council alongside Cumberland Council.

Police services are provided by Cumbria Constabulary and fire services by Cumbria Fire and Rescue Service. These are both overseen by the Cumbria Police, Fire and Crime Commissioner.

Twinnings
Settlement	Twinned settlement
Dalton-in-Furness	Dalton, Pennsylvania, United States
Kendal	Killarney, Ireland; Rinteln, Germany
Penrith	Penrith, New South Wales, Australia
Sedbergh	Zreče, Slovenia
Ulverston	Albert, France
Windermere	Diessen am Ammersee, Germany

== Economy ==
- Barrow's shipyard is the UK's largest. BAE Systems is the current owner and employs around 14,500.
- Associated British Ports Holdings own and operate the Royal Port of Barrow.
- The only Kimberly-Clark mill in the North of England is located in Barrow.
- James Fisher & Sons, a large provider of marine engineering services, is based in Barrow.
- One of the largest single-site furniture stores in the UK, Stollers, is located in Barrow.
- Center Parcs owns a large resort in Whinfell Forest near Penrith.
- Logistics company Eddie Stobart Logistics, own a large transport depot at Penrith.
- National sawdust, animal bedding, bark suppliers and road hauliers A W Jenkinson are headquartered at Clifton, Penrith.
- Pharmaceutical company GlaxoSmithKline operates a large factory in Ulverston.
- International kitchenware retailer Lakeland has its headquarters and flagship store in Windermere.
- Kendal Nutricare Ltd now run the baby milk factory formerly operated by Farley Health Products, a subsidiary of the Heinz Company in Kendal.

== Transport ==
The West Coast Main Railway Line runs through the district, with stations at Penrith and Oxenholme. Services on the line are provided by Avanti West Coast and TransPennine Express. The Settle–Carlisle line also crosses the district, with services to Leeds operated by Northern calling at Armathwaite, Lazonby, Langwathby, Appleby, Kirkby Stephen, Garsdale and Dent stations. Other lines in the district include the Cumbrian Coast (the line terminates at Barrow-in-Furness), Furness (to Lancaster) and Lakes (which runs through Kendal) which are all also run by Northern.

Roads through the district include the M6 motorway, the A6 and the A66.

Buses in the Lake District are predominantly run by Stagecoach Cumbria and North Lancashire.

== Media ==
In terms of television, the area is covered by BBC North West and ITV Granada which both broadcast from Salford and BBC North East and Cumbria broadcasting from Newcastle and ITV Border that broadcast from Gateshead.

Radio stations for the area are BBC Radio Cumbria, BBC Radio Lancashire can also be received, Heart North West, Smooth Lake District, Greatest Hits Radio Cumbria & South West Scotland and community based stations: Eden FM Radio, Lake District Radio, and Bay Trust Radio.

The district's local newspapers are the Cumberland and Westmorland Herald, The Westmorland Gazette and North West Evening Mail.

== See also ==
- 2019–2023 structural changes to local government in England
