= Ramsgreave =

Civil parish in Lancashire, England

Coordinates: 53.775°N 2.502°W

- Shown within Ribble Valley Location within Lancashire
- Population: 817 (2011 Census)
- Civil parish: Ramsgreave
- District: Ribble Valley
- Shire county: Lancashire
- Region: North West
- Country: England
- Sovereign state: United Kingdom
- Post town: BLACKBURN
- Postcode district: BB1
- Dialling code: 01254
- Police: Lancashire
- Fire: Lancashire
- Ambulance: North West
- UK Parliament: Ribble Valley

Ramsgreave is a civil parish in the Ribble Valley district of Lancashire, England. The parish is on the northern edge of Blackburn although it is just outside the Blackburn with Darwen unitary district, and although the south and east of the parish is suburban, the parish also includes a rural area including Ribble Valley's only greenbelt land. The population of the civil parish at the 2011 census was 817. It is served by Ramsgreave and Wilpshire railway station. There are approximately 6 miles (9.7 km) of footpaths and 2.5 miles (4.0 km) of road within the parish.

A former Roman road, between Manchester and Ribchester, passed through the parish; this is now almost entirely on private land.

Ramsgreave has a sporting heritage. As a result of constant boundary changes in the 20th century, Blackburn Rugby Club spans the border of the parish, with pitches in both Ramsgreave and Blackburn separated by a small brook. This area has now become surrounded by new build housing up to the brook which is the border with Ramsgreave. The village was also briefly home to Ramsgreave Rugby League Club. The team, which played on the Pleckgate municipal recreation grounds, existed between 1998 and 2004 and was largely the brain child of local students, disheartened by the lack of a local rugby league team. Ramsgreave RFC played in the North West Counties League until the league folded in August 2004. Notable alumni include Mark Abersock (Whynborough Reds), Greg Suligowski (North of England Colts) and Shilul Nituy (Shinti Warriors SA).

The parish has no pubs, churches or public buildings within its boundary. It has several businesses including some farms producing poultry, lamb and beef, and businesses on Ramsgreave Business Park off Pleckgate Road. Ramsgreave has an active Parish Council who meet every quarter at Wilpshire Methodist Church.
