= Daisyfield railway station =

Disused railway station in Lancashire, England

Coordinates: 53.7542°N 2.4666°W

Daisyfield

General information
- Location: Daisyfield, Blackburn, Blackburn with Darwen; England
- Platforms: 2

Other information
- Status: Disused

History
- Pre-grouping: Lancashire and Yorkshire Railway
- Post-grouping: London, Midland and Scottish Railway

Key dates
- 1854: Opened
- 3 November 1958: Closed to passengers
Location

Daisyfield railway station was a railway station that served the Daisyfield area of Blackburn, Lancashire.

== History ==
The station was opened by the Lancashire & Yorkshire Railway in 1854 and closed by British Railways in 1958. When the line was reopened as far as Clitheroe in 1994, Daisyfield remained closed; however the station signal box is still in operation to supervise the adjacent level crossing.

It also acts as a fringe box to Preston power signal box, controlling the line towards Clitheroe and the single line via slotted signals, requiring both the signalman at Preston and Daisyfield, to give a release before a train can use the single line. The disused platforms are still visible from passing trains.

== Former services ==
Preceding station	Disused railways	Following station
Ramsgreave and Wilpshire	L&YR; Ribble Valley Line	Blackburn
