= Elizabeth Ackroyd =

British civil servant

- Ackroyd in September 1970
- Born: Dorothy Elizabeth Ackroyd; 13 August 1910; Wilpshire, Lancashire
- Died: 28 June 1987 (aged 76); Chelsea, London
- Occupations: Civil servant and first director of the Consumer Council

Dame Dorothy Elizabeth 'Betty' Ackroyd DBE (13 August 1910 – 28 June 1987) was a British civil servant and first director of the Consumer Council, which ran from 1963 to 1971.

She worked for a number of associations, councils and boards after her retirement, including as president and chairperson of the Patients Association.

== Early life ==
Ackroyd was born on 13 August 1910 at Hydrastin House, Wilpshire, Lancashire. Her father was Major Charles Harris Ackroyd, an Army officer, and her mother was Dorothy Margaret Baynes. She was educated privately by a governess alongside her sister, Beryl.

She matriculated at St Hugh's College, Oxford, in 1930 but suffered from ill health and so did not graduate until 1934. She received a second class degree in philosophy, politics and economics. Ackroyd then wrote a thesis titled The Economic Policy of Trades Unions in Britain in the post-war period as illustrated by the proceedings of the Trades Union Congress under the supervision of G. D. H. Cole and received a BLitt degree in 1936. She worked briefly as a research assistant for Barnett House.

== Career ==
Ackroyd joined the Ministry of Supply in 1940 as a principal, became a statistician and then an under-secretary by 1952. She was director of the steel and power division of the Economic Commission for Europe from 1950 to 1951 and was on the United Kingdom delegation to the High Authority of the European Coal and Steel Community from 1952 to 1955.

She was appointed as the first director of the Consumer Council when it was created in 1963. While she worked on the Council, she was given the nickname "Public Protector No. 1". She was proud of her success banning dangerous toys and flammable material which was used for children's nightclothes.

In 1970, she was appointed as a Dame Commander of the British Empire and the following year, the Consumer Council was abolished by the government of Edward Heath.

== Later life ==
She retired in 1971 but remained active in public service. She was vice president of the Consumers' Association from 1970 to 1986 and was on its executive committee until her death. She was president of the Patients Association from 1971 to 1978 and chairman from 1978 to her death. She was a member of the Post Office Users' National Council and an executive of the National Council for Voluntary Organisations and the Pedestrians' Association for Road Safety.

She owned a race horse from 1965 and served on the boards of a number of related organisations. She sat on the Horserace Totalisator Board from 1975 to 1984, and was its first female member, and on the board for the Bloodstock and Racehorse Industries Confederation from 1977 to 1978. She was also one of the few elected female members of the Jockey Club.

She died on 28 June 1987 at the Royal Marsden Hospital, Chelsea, London.
