= Horton-in-Ribblesdale railway station =

Railway station in North Yorkshire, England

Horton-in-Ribblesdale
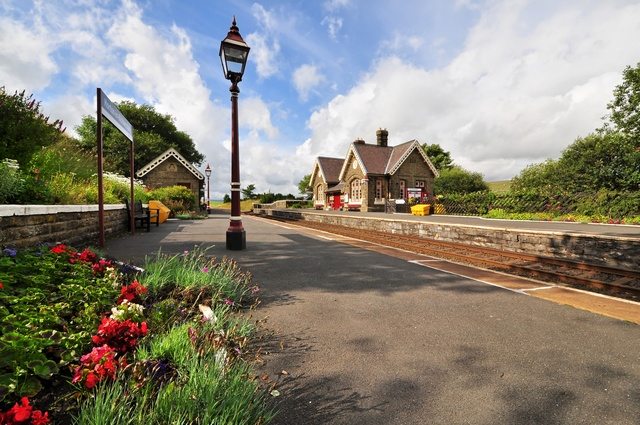

General information
- Location: Horton-in-Ribblesdale, North Yorkshire; England
- Coordinates: 54°08′57″N 2°18′07″W
- Grid reference: SD803726
- Owner: Network Rail
- Manager: Northern Trains
- Platforms: 2
- Tracks: 2

Other information
- Station code: HIR
- Classification: DfT category F2

History
- Original company: Midland Railway
- Pre-grouping: Midland Railway
- Post-grouping: London, Midland and Scottish Railway; British Rail (London Midland Region)

Key dates
- 1 May 1876: Opened as Horton
- 26 September 1927: Renamed Horton-in-Ribblesdale
- 4 May 1970: Closed
- 16 July 1986: Reopened

Passengers
- 2021/22: ▲18,418
- 2022/23: ▲19,912
- 2023/24: ▲20,570
- 2024/25: ▲23,176
- 2025/26: ▲25,596

Services
Preceding station	Northern	Following station
Settle towards Leeds via Settle	Settle and Carlisle Line	Ribblehead towards Carlisle
Location
- Location within North Yorkshire
Notes
- Passenger statistics from the Office of Rail and Road

Horton-in-Ribblesdale is a railway station on the Settle and Carlisle Line, which runs between Carlisle and Leeds via Settle. The station, situated 47 miles 40 chains (76.4 km) north-west of Leeds, serves the village of Horton-in-Ribblesdale in North Yorkshire, England. It is owned by Network Rail and managed by Northern.

== History ==
The station was completed by the Midland Railway in 1876 and was opened for passengers on 1 May. It was initially named "Horton". The London Midland and Scottish Railway absorbed the Midland Railway on 1 January 1923 and renamed the station as Horton-in-Ribblesdale on 26 September 1927.

The station buildings were designed by the Midland Railway company architect John Holloway Sanders.

The station is currently (2019) served and managed by Northern, as are all the trains calling at the station. It is unstaffed, with no ticket vending facilities (so tickets can only be purchased in advance or on the train – Northern has stated it plans to provide a ticket machine here in the future). The station waiting room is open for public use, having been restored by the Settle & Carlisle Railway Trust in 2002 as part of a wider refurbishment of the main buildings on the eastern side (other parts of the building are rented out for commercial use).

It is located near to Pen-y-ghent, one of the mountains known collectively as the Yorkshire Three Peaks. The station and the village of Horton-in-Ribblesdale are at 850 feet (260 m) above sea level, as stated on the decorative station information board, and are about 6 miles (10 km) north of Settle.

In the 1950s and 1960s under stationmaster Taylor, Horton won the "Best Kept Station" award for 17 consecutive years. The station lost its passenger service on 4 May 1970, but reopened in July 1986, along with several other local stations on the line under British Rail. Goods traffic was handled at the station until 1964, with sidings at the southern end serving wagonload traffic from the nearby Horton Quarry continuing in use until the early 1980s. These were removed after the station signal box was decommissioned in 1984, but plans to reinstate them (as was done at nearby Arcow Quarry in 2016) have been approved, with the new connection into the quarry from the main line commissioned in June 2025.

== Facilities ==
As the station did not have a footbridge until recently, the platforms are linked by a foot crossing (known in railway terms as a barrow crossing). Both platforms are lower than standard (though the southbound one has been partially raised to improve access to trains). Train running information is available via telephone and timetable posters, with customer information screens available following a rolling upgrade programme of station facilities by operator Northern.

The station has now received a new footbridge (announced in March 2020), thanks to a £4.2 million scheme funded jointly by Network Rail and the government. This has seen a fully accessible footbridge (complete with lifts) installed to replace the current barrow crossing. The bridge has also allowed a scheme to relay the former quarry sidings (to permit Horton Quarry to dispatch its stone by rail once more) to proceed, as more trains would be shunting in and out of the station. However, the Yorkshire Dales National Park authority objected to the proposal for a footbridge on the grounds that the design will impede on the conservation area, as the buildings that will house the lift shafts will be prominent above the station. The objection was unsuccessful, and the new bridge was commissioned in December 2024.

== Services ==
There is about one train every two hours in each direction: southbound to Leeds (seven in total) and northbound to Carlisle (eight, plus one evening train that terminates at Ribblehead). The total is slightly unbalanced as some trains do not stop here. There is an extra train to Leeds and two services to/from Blackburn and Manchester Victoria on Saturdays, whilst there are five trains a day to both Leeds and Carlisle on Sundays (one of the former now continues to Nottingham).

== Sources ==
- Butt, R. V. J. (October 1995). The Directory of Railway Stations: details every public and private passenger station, halt, platform and stopping place, past and present (1st ed.). Sparkford: Patrick Stephens Ltd. ISBN 978-1-85260-508-7. OCLC 60251199. OL 11956311M.

Preceding station	National Rail	Following station
Settle	Northern Trains; Settle and Carlisle Line	Ribblehead
Settle	Northern Trains; Ribble Valley line Limited service – Saturdays only	Ribblehead
	Historical railways	
Settle	Midland Railway; Settle and Carlisle Line	Ribblehead
