= Appleby railway station =

Railway station in Cumbria, England

Appleby
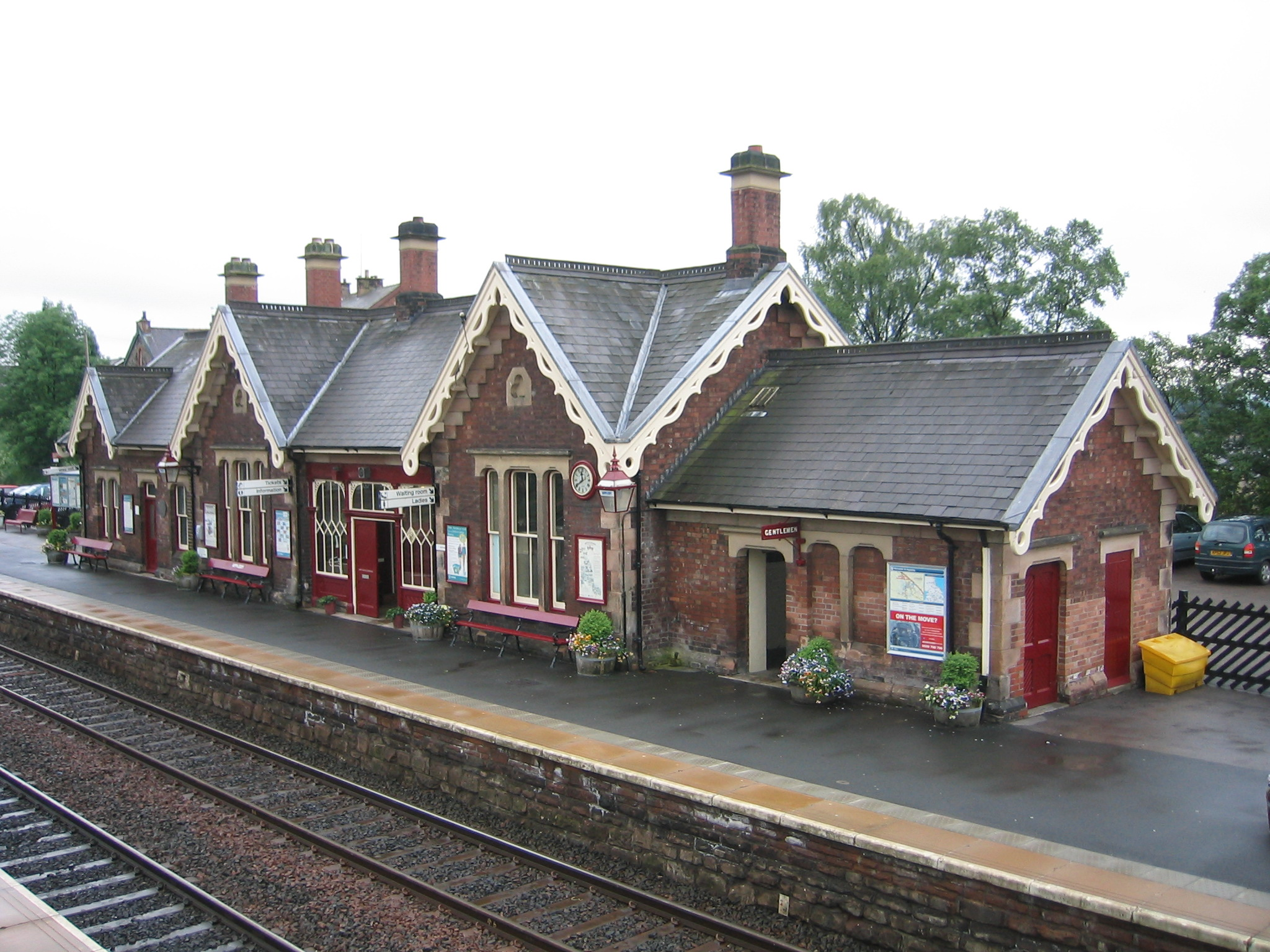

General information
- Location: Appleby-in-Westmorland, Westmorland and Furness; England
- Coordinates: 54°34′49″N 2°29′12″W
- Grid reference: NY686206
- Owner: Network Rail
- Manager: Northern Trains
- Platforms: 2
- Tracks: 2

Other information
- Station code: APP
- Classification: DfT category E

History
- Original company: Midland Railway
- Pre-grouping: Midland Railway
- Post-grouping: London, Midland and Scottish Railway; British Rail (London Midland Region)

Key dates
- 1 May 1876: Opened as Appleby
- 1 September 1952: Renamed Appleby West
- 6 May 1968: Renamed Appleby

Passengers
- 2020/21: ▼11,232
- 2021/22: ▲47,476
- 2022/23: ▲52,674
- 2023/24: ▲56,512
- 2024/25: ▲63,348

Services
Preceding station	Northern	Following station
Kirkby Stephen towards Leeds via Settle	Settle and Carlisle Line	Langwathby towards Carlisle

Listed Building – Grade II
- Feature: Original Midland Railway station building
- Designated: 14 May 1990
- Reference no.: 1311476
Location
- Location within the former Eden District Location within Cumbria
Notes
- Passenger statistics from the Office of Rail and Road

Appleby is a railway station on the Settle and Carlisle Line, which runs between Carlisle and Leeds via Settle. The station, situated 30 miles 60 chains (49.5 km) south-east of Carlisle, serves the market town of Appleby-in-Westmorland in Cumbria, England. It is owned by Network Rail and managed by Northern Trains.

The station was formerly known as Appleby West, with the older Appleby East station located nearby on the Eden Valley Railway. The buildings of Appleby East still survive.

== History ==
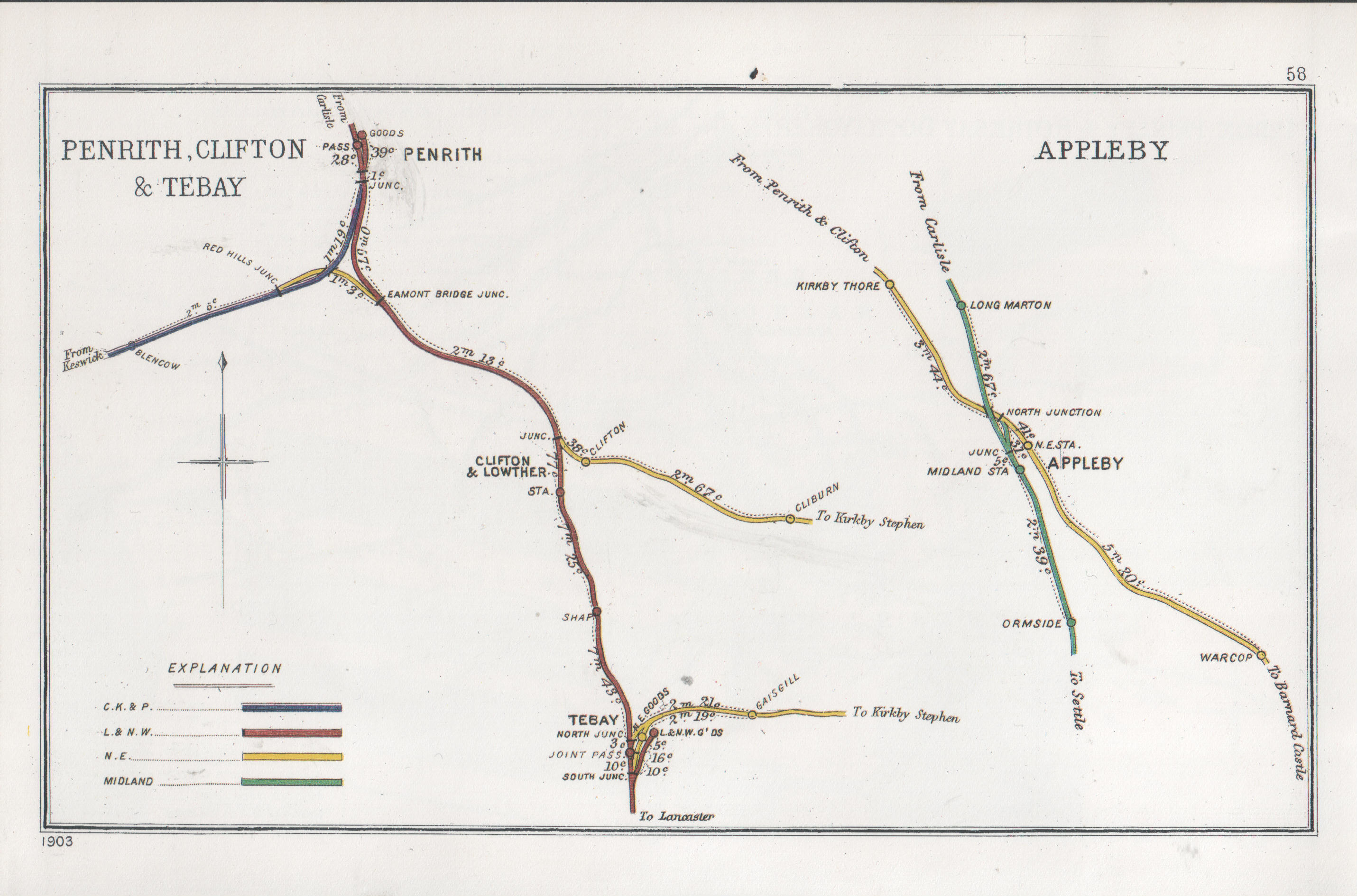
A 1903 Railway Clearing House Junction Diagram showing (right) railways in the vicinity of Appleby. The present station is shown as MIDLAND STA

The station was designed by the Midland Railway company architect John Holloway Sanders. Opened by the Midland Railway at the same time as the line itself in May 1876, it became part of the London, Midland and Scottish Railway during the Grouping of 1923. The station then passed to the London Midland Region of British Railways upon nationalisation in 1948. Following the withdrawal of local stopping trains in May 1970 it was one of only two stations on the Settle-Carlisle line to remain open, Settle being the other,

When sectorisation was introduced in the 1980s, the station was served by Regional Railways until the privatisation of British Rail.

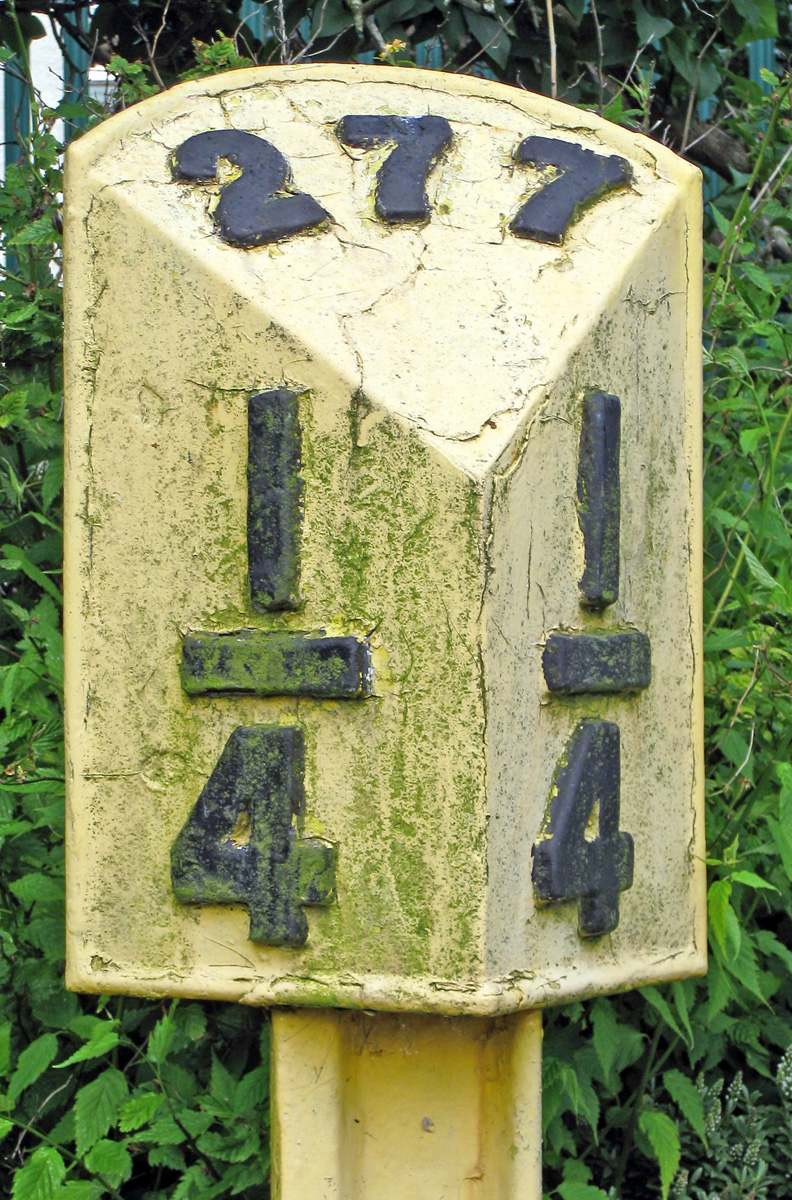
Mile post at Appleby

The line through the station is often used as a diversionary route for the West Coast Main Line for both passenger and freight trains. A pre-nationalisation milepost on the southbound platform marks the station's location 277 1/4 miles (446.2 km) miles from London (St Pancras) on the Midland Railway route via Leicester, Derby, Sheffield and Leeds.

== Facilities ==
The main brick-built station building with booking office and waiting room is located on the northbound platform; this is the original building of 1876. A smaller brick-built waiting room, also of 1876, is located on the southbound platform. A period wrought iron lattice footbridge links the two platforms. Step-free access to both is also available, via the road underbridge & ramps to the southbound platform, direct from the station entrance for northbound travellers. Tickets can be purchased from the ticket office or a ticket vending machine. Train running times are available via telephone and timetable posters, with customer information screens on both platforms and public address to announce trains.

To the north are a number of engineers sidings, which once formed the connection to the Eden Valley branch to Warcop, Kirkby Stephen East and Barnard Castle; an active signal box was repaired and refurbished in the autumn of 2019 to fix issues with rotten timbers and box foundations.

The main station building is Grade II listed; the waiting room on the northbound platform and the station's footbridge are separately Grade II listed. The footbridge was moved to Appleby West from Mansfield in 1901.

== Services ==
There is generally a service every two hours daily northbound to Carlisle and southbound to Leeds. Six services each way call on Sundays, including one to Nottingham.

Preceding station	National Rail	Following station
Kirkby Stephen	Northern Trains; Settle and Carlisle Line	Langwathby
	Historical railways	
Ormside	Midland Railway; Settle and Carlisle Line	Long Marton

== Accidents and incidents ==
- Well-known railway photographer and enthusiast Bishop Eric Treacy died at Appleby railway station on 13 May 1978 after suffering a heart attack whilst waiting to photograph Evening Star, which was due to pass through the station on a rail tour. A plaque located on the down platform commemorates the spot.
- Services had been disrupted from 28 January 2016, due to a landslip at Eden Brows (north of Armathwaite) which destabilised the embankment on the eastern side of the railway, where it passes through the Eden Gorge. An emergency timetable was put into operation, with trains from the south terminating or starting at Appleby, and buses running between Appleby and Carlisle. Since 27 June 2016 some rail services were restored further north to Armathwaite, with bus links to and from Carlisle, Penrith, Appleby and Armathwaite continuing to supplement the train service. Repair works were due to continue until the end of March 2017. These were completed on schedule, with the line reopening through to Carlisle on 31 March 2017.

== Steam Specials ==
There is a water tank with water spout at the south end of platform 2 which is used to supply steam locomotives which stop with southbound trains during special excursions on the Settle and Carlisle line.

== Gallery ==
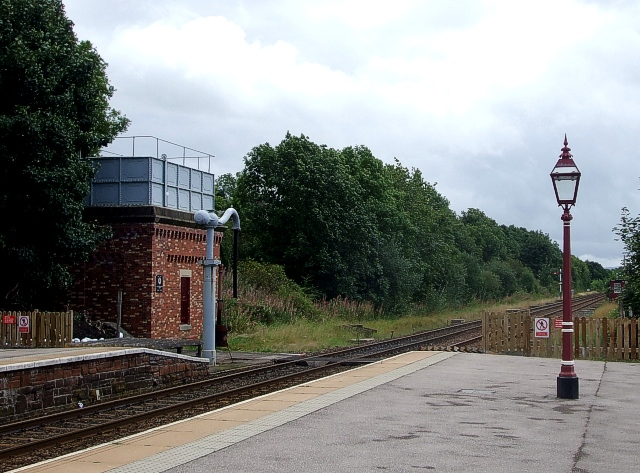
The watering crane stood at the end of platform 2 waiting to water the next steam engine.

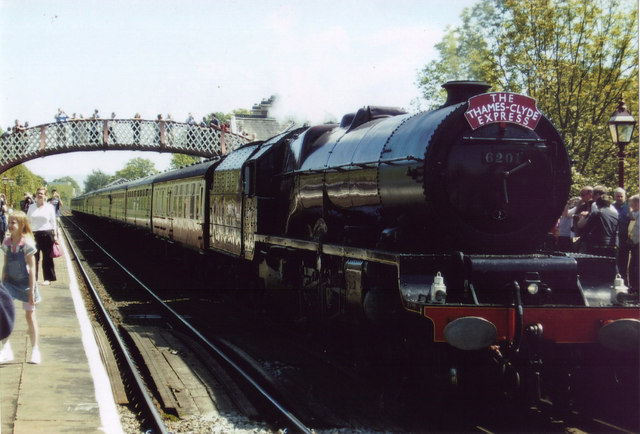
6201 Princess Elizabeth at Appleby about to stop to take on water.

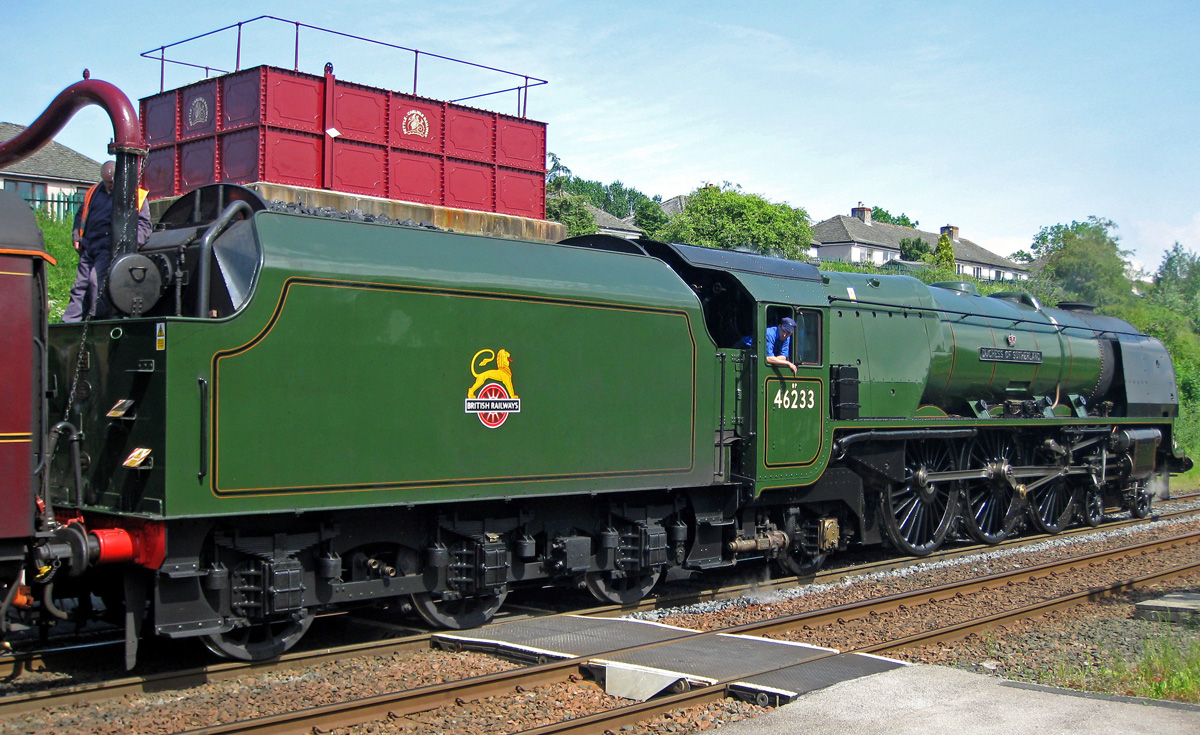
46233 Duchess of Sutherland parked up opposite the water tank and spout while working a southbound railtour.

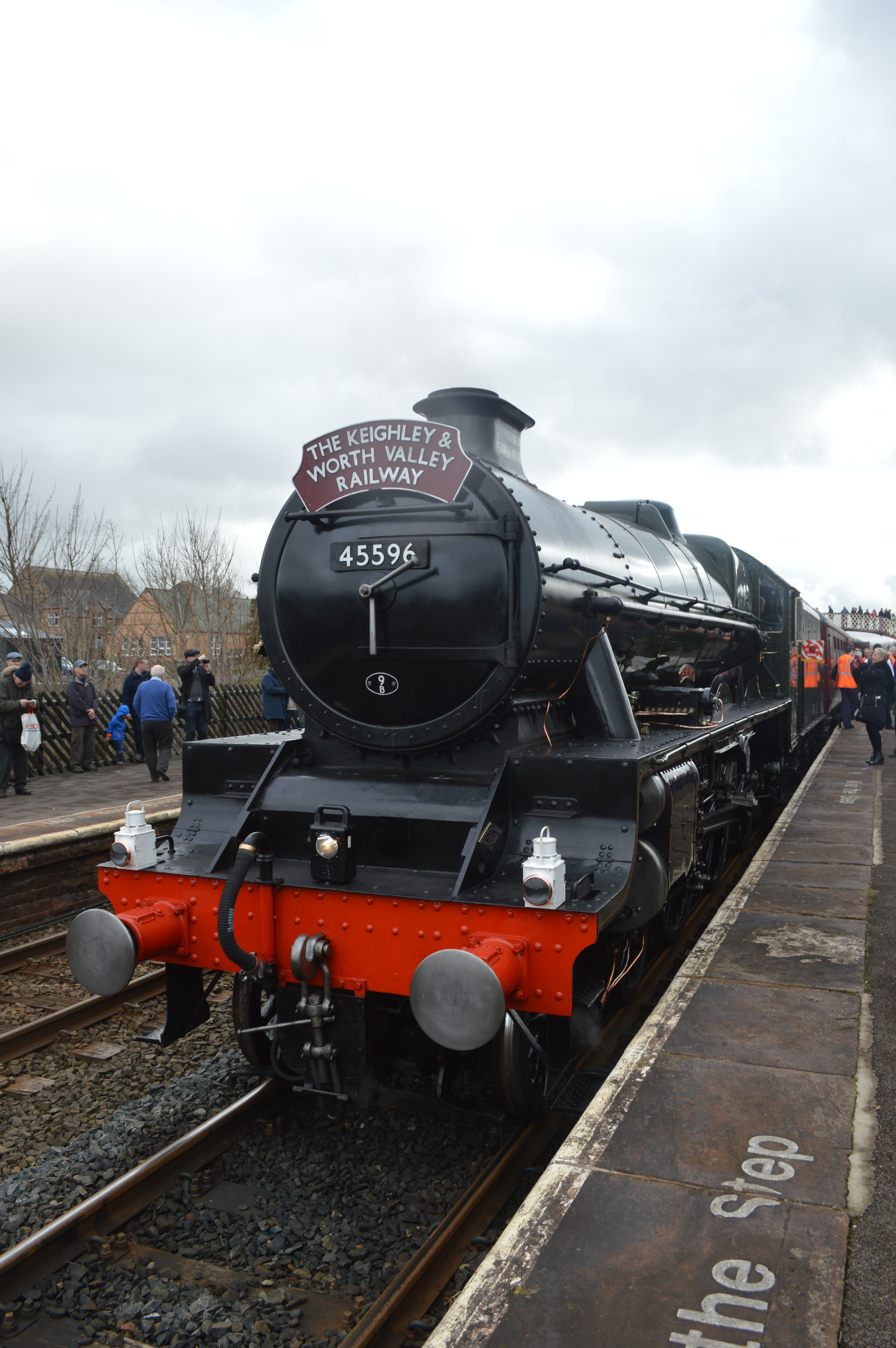
45596 Bahamas stopped in platform taking on water while working "The Bahamas Renaissance II" railtour north to Carlisle on Feb 16th 2019.

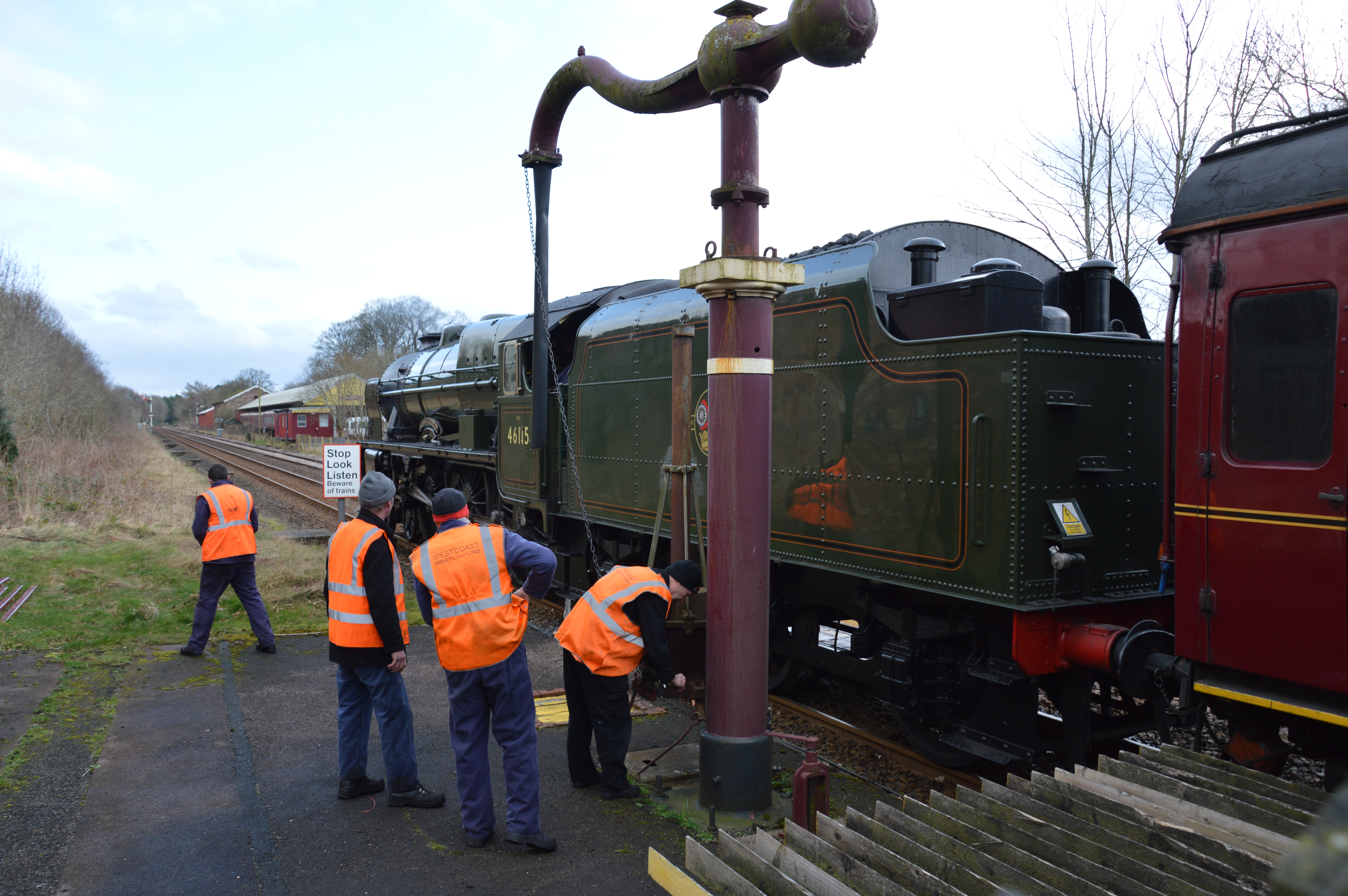
46115 Scots Guardsman taking on water from the spout while working a southbound "Winter Cumbrian Mountain Express" on Feb 8th 2020.

== See also ==
- Listed buildings in Appleby-in-Westmorland
