= Settle railway station =

Railway station in North Yorkshire, England

Settle
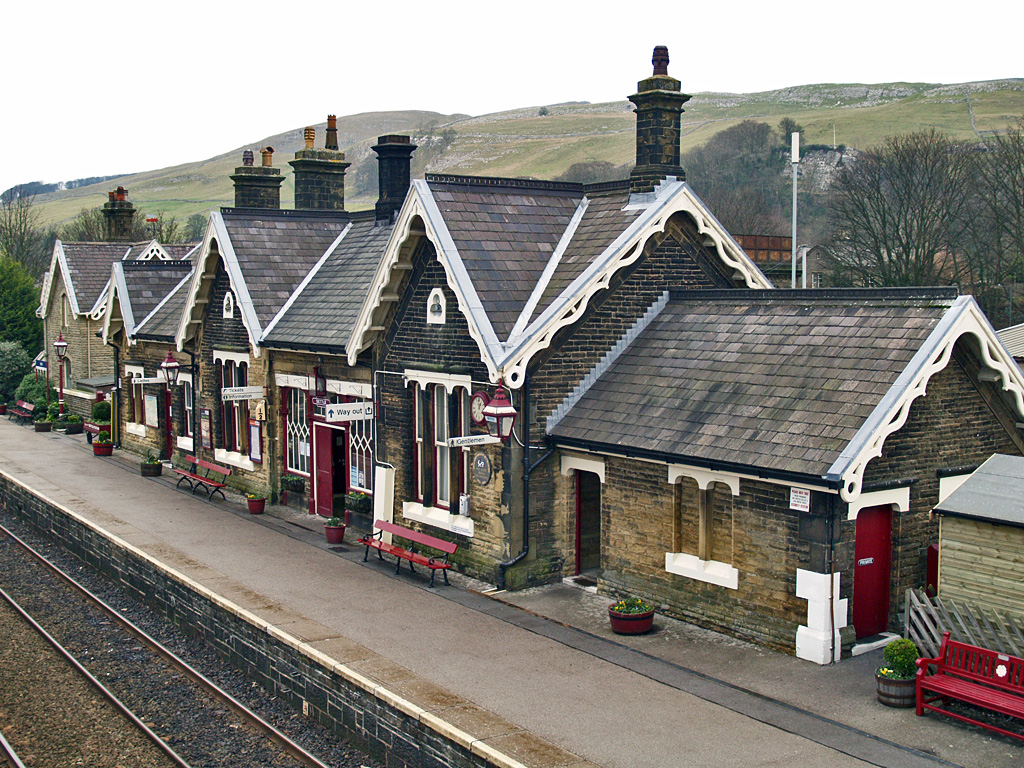

General information
- Location: Settle, North Yorkshire; England
- Coordinates: 54°04′01″N 2°16′51″W
- Grid reference: SD817634
- Owner: Network Rail
- Manager: Northern Trains
- Platforms: 2
- Tracks: 2

Other information
- Station code: SET
- Classification: DfT category E

History
- Original company: Midland Railway
- Pre-grouping: Midland Railway
- Post-grouping: London, Midland and Scottish Railway; British Rail (London Midland Region)

Key dates
- 1 May 1876: Opened as Settle New
- 1 July 1879: Renamed Settle

Passengers
- 2021/22: ▲0.118 million
- 2022/23: ▲0.131 million
- 2023/24: ▲0.134 million
- 2024/25: ▲0.147 million
- 2025/26: ▲0.159 million

Listed Building – Grade II
- Feature: Original Midland Railway station building
- Designated: 9 March 1984
- Reference no.: 1132349
Location
- Location within North Yorkshire
Notes
- Passenger statistics from the Office of Rail and Road

Settle is a railway station on the Settle and Carlisle Line, which runs between Carlisle and Leeds. The station, situated 41 miles 37 chains (66.7 km) north-west of Leeds, serves the market town of Settle in North Yorkshire, England. It is owned by Network Rail and managed by Northern Trains.

The market town is also served by the railway station at Giggleswick, situated about a mile to the south-west; it is on the Bentham Line, which runs between Leeds and Morecambe via Lancaster.

== History ==
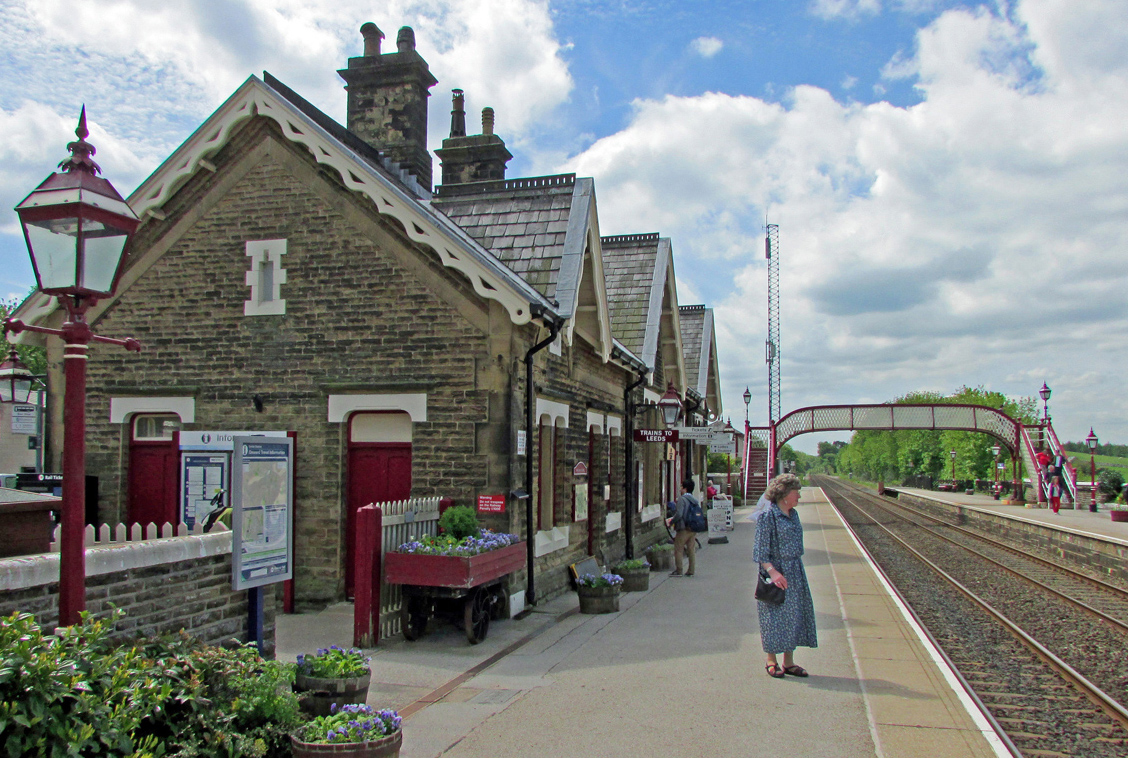
Settle station looking south, showing the ex-North British Railway footbridge

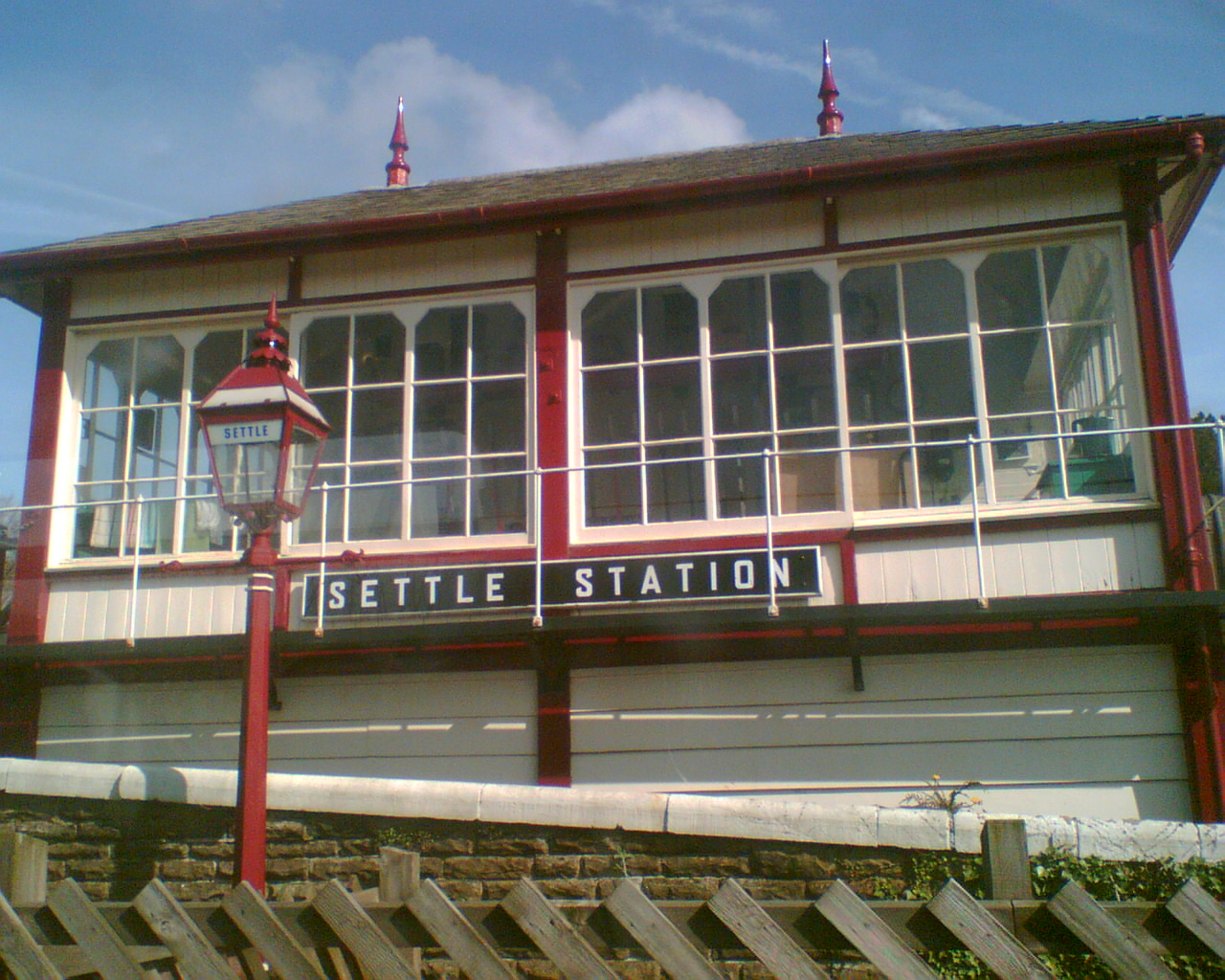
Settle signal box

The station was designed by the Midland Railway company architect John Holloway Sanders. The station was opened with the line on 1 May 1876 and was originally named Settle New to distinguish it from the nearby station on a different route, which was renamed Settle Old at the same time. Settle New was renamed Settle on 1 July 1879, by which time Settle Old had become Giggleswick. Goods facilities were withdrawn from the station in 1970.

The station was Grade II listed on 9 March 1984.

The platforms are linked by an ex-North British Railway footbridge that was formerly located at Drem station in East Lothian, until electrification of the East Coast Main Line made it redundant. It was then dismantled and re-erected here in 1993 to allow the old barrow crossing at the north end of the station to be taken out of regular use; the crossing is still available for wheelchair users when the station is staffed.

The former station signal box, which had been out of railway use since 1984, was relocated further north to be adjacent to the Down platform in 1997; it is open to the public on most Saturdays.

The water tower situated near the station in the former goods yard was converted into residential accommodation in 2011. It has subsequently been featured in several television documentaries.

== Facilities ==
The station is located very close to the town centre and is staffed on a part-time basis. There is a range of facilities available, including a waiting room, toilets and a souvenir shop in the main buildings on the southbound platform.

There is a period stone-built waiting room located on the northbound platform and a new stone and glass shelter on the southbound side.

A ticket machine is available for use when the booking office is closed. Train running information is provided by timetable posters, a PA system and digital information screens.

== Accidents and incidents ==
On 21 January 1960, an express passenger train derailed just to the north of the station (near the village of Langcliffe) and then collided with a northbound freight due to a defect on the BR Standard Class 7 locomotive hauling it. Five people were killed and nine were injured.

== Services ==
Monday to Saturdays, there is generally a two-hourly service southbound to Leeds (nine trains a day in total Mon-Sat) and northbound to Carlisle (eight). The last train of the day from Leeds runs only as far as Ribblehead and the corresponding return to Leeds starts back from there. Trains terminated or started from either Appleby or Armathwaite from the spring of 2016 whilst Network Rail repaired a major landslip at Eden Brows (between Armathwaite & Carlisle). A replacement bus service was in operation over the affected section until the project to repair the line was completed in March 2017. The project was completed on schedule and the line reopened to traffic on 31 March 2017.

On Sundays there are now six trains in each direction throughout the year (including one through train to Nottingham); the additional summer service between Preston and Carlisle via Blackburn and Clitheroe (northbound in the morning, returning south in the afternoon) operated by Northern Rail under the DalesRail brand did not run in 2023 and has now been withdrawn. A replacement service on Saturdays from Rochdale via Manchester Victoria and Blackburn started in June 2024, with two trips each way up to Ribblehead. They are timed to connect with Leeds to Carlisle trains to allow access to stations further north.

The new Northern franchise awarded to Arriva Rail North in December 2015 and which started in April 2016, saw modest service improvements from the station implemented from the May 2018 timetable change, with one extra weekday service each way and two extra trains each way on Sundays.

== See also ==
- Listed buildings in Settle, North Yorkshire

Preceding station	National Rail	Following station
Long Preston towards Leeds	Northern Trains; Settle and Carlisle Line	Horton-in-Ribblesdale towards Carlisle
Hellifield towards Rochdale	Northern Trains; Ribble Valley Line; Limited service – Saturdays only	Horton-in-Ribblesdale towards Ribblehead
	Historical railways	
Settle Junction	Midland Railway; Settle and Carlisle Line	Horton-in-Ribblesdale
