= Ribblehead railway station =

Railway station in North Yorkshire, England

Ribblehead
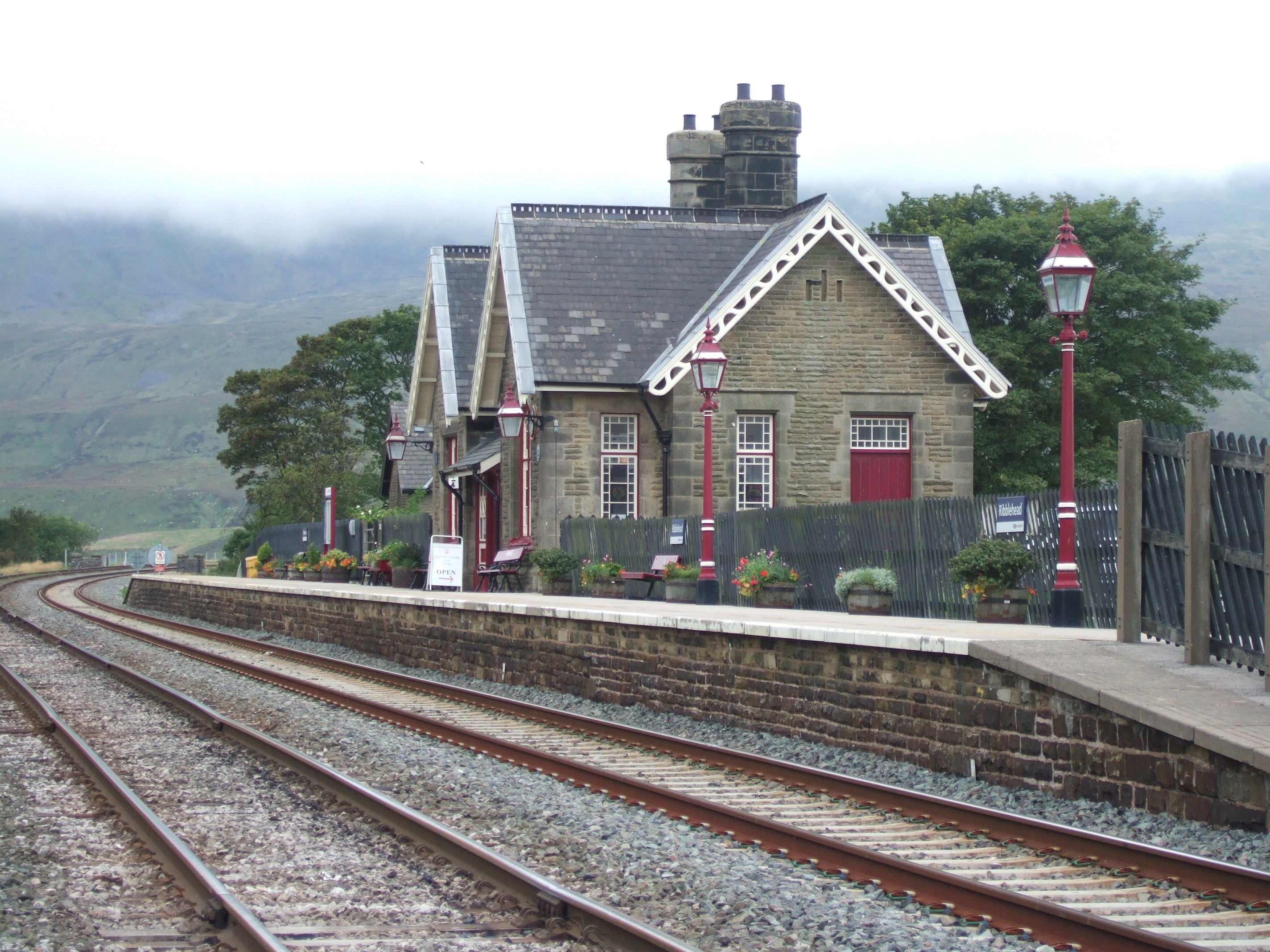
- The southbound platform seen in 2007

General information
- Location: Ribblehead, North Yorkshire; England
- Coordinates: 54°12′20″N 2°21′39″W
- Grid reference: SD765789
- Owner: Network Rail
- Manager: Northern Trains
- Platforms: 2
- Tracks: 2

Other information
- Station code: RHD
- Classification: DfT category F2

History
- Original company: Midland Railway
- Pre-grouping: Midland Railway
- Post-grouping: London, Midland and Scottish Railway; British Rail (London Midland Region)

Key dates
- 4 December 1876: Opened as Batty Green
- 1 May 1877: Renamed Ribblehead
- 4 May 1970: Closed
- 16 July 1986: Reopened (Note: The Carlisle-bound platform was reopened later, on 28 May 1993.)

Passengers
- 2021/22: ▲20,032
- 2022/23: ▲23,426
- 2023/24: ▲26,374
- 2024/25: ▲33,682
- 2025/26: ▲37,112
Location
- Location within North Yorkshire
Notes
- Passenger statistics from the Office of Rail and Road

Ribblehead is a railway station which serves the area of Ribblehead, in North Yorkshire, England, on the Settle and Carlisle Line, which runs between Carlisle and Leeds via Settle. The station, situated 247 miles 20 chains (398 km) from St Pancras (measured via Keighley, Normanton and the now-closed line through Cudworth), is owned by Network Rail and managed by Northern Trains.

The station is located at the southern end of the Ribblehead Viaduct, which spans a length of 400 metres (1,300 ft) over Batty Moss.

== History ==
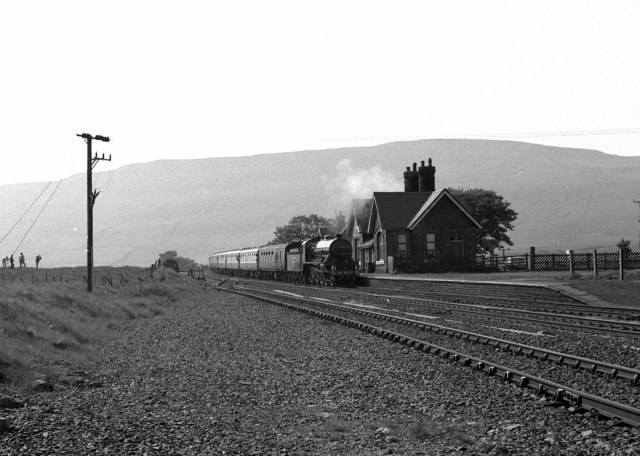
A steam train at the station in 1990, before the addition of the northbound platform

The station was designed by Midland Railway architect, John Holloway Sanders. It opened on 4 December 1876 as Batty Green, but was later renamed Ribblehead on 1 May 1877. It was closed, along with the other smaller stations on the line, on 4 May 1970.

The station was temporarily reopened for summer DalesRail specials from 3 May 1975, and was fully reopened on 16 July 1986 by British Rail, with only one platform (southbound) in place. The northbound platform had been demolished after the station's closure in May 1970, in order to allow the construction of transfer sidings for a nearby quarry; until the replacement northbound platform was opened on 28 May 1993, trains towards Carlisle did not stop at the station.

In previous years, Ribblehead served as a meteorological station, with the stationmaster transmitting coded reports to the Air Ministry. In 1957, the task was carried out by a former Royal Air Force navigator. Monthly religious services were held in the station's waiting room by the Vicar of Ingleton. These were accompanied by a harmonium concealed behind a billboard in the waiting room, which was brought to the station by a missionary who came as a minister to the construction gangs when the railway was being constructed through the moors in the early 1870s. British Rail charged 2 shillings for the use of the waiting room, which saw as many as 50 worshippers at harvest festivals.

This station is now leased by the Settle and Carlisle Railway Trust, who have completely restored and refurbished it; it reopened to public use in 2000. There is a small shop selling memorabilia, and a visitor centre now occupies the station building, which includes exhibits about the history of the line and the fight to keep it open. The Trust also restored the former stationmasters' house, now a private residence.

== Facilities ==
The platforms both have level access, but the northbound one is linked to the rest of the station by a barrow crossing and is not recommended for use for disabled passengers without assistance. Train running information is available via telephone and information posters. The station is unstaffed and no ticket machine is provided, so passengers must purchase them on the train or before their journey. Train operator Northern has installed both customer information screens and a public address system as part of a rolling station upgrade programme across its network.

== Passenger volume ==
Passenger volume at Ribblehead
	2004–05	2005–06	2006–07	2007–08	2008–09	2009–10	2010–11	2011–12	2012–13	2013–14	2014–15	2015–16	2016–17	2017–18	2018–19	2019–20	2020–21	2021–22	2022–23	2023–24	2024–25
Entries and exits	15,371	14,870	15,265	14,046	16,940	18,606	21,200	20,894	18,636	18,448	19,820	18,930	17,734	21,396	19,260	23,102	4,754	20,032	23,426	26,374	33,682

The statistics cover twelve month periods that start in April.

== Services ==
Generally, there is a train every two hours northbound to Carlisle (eight departures on Mondays to Saturdays) and southbound to Leeds (nine on weekdays, twelve on Saturdays), with several services starting from the station towards Leeds; southbound trains reverse at Blea Moor Loop. Six trains call on Sundays northbound to Carlisle, with five towards Leeds.

The DalesRail service from Blackpool via Preston that used to call here did not run in 2023 due to a lack of available train crew. A replacement two return-trip Saturday service to/from Rochdale via Manchester Victoria and Blackburn commenced on 8 June 2024, marketed as the "Yorkshire Dales Explorer". This terminates here northbound and starts from here heading south, with connections for stations further north.

Between February 2016 and March 2017, northbound trains terminated at Appleby or Armathwaite (with a bus link to Carlisle) due to repair works on the damaged embankment at Eden Brows. Services through to Carlisle resumed on 31 March 2017 upon reopening of the affected section to traffic.

Preceding station	National Rail	Following station
Horton-in-Ribblesdale	Northern Trains; Settle and Carlisle Line	Dent
Horton-in-Ribblesdale	Northern Trains; Ribble Valley line Limited service – Saturdays only	Terminus
	Historical railways	
Horton-in-Ribblesdale	Midland Railway; Settle and Carlisle Line	Dent

=== Freight services ===
Colas Rail Freight began hauling timber from the transfer sidings adjacent to the station in August 2010. The timber arrives by lorry from the local fells and is transported to a woodchip and board plant at Chirk in North Wales.

Roadstone from Ingleton Quarry has also occasionally been railed out of the sidings.

== Community rail ==
The station, as with all others along the Settle-Carlisle line, is part of the Settle & Carlisle Railway Trust, a Community Rail scheme.

== Bibliography ==
- Caton, Peter (2018). Remote Stations. Leicestershire: Matador. ISBN 978-1-78901-408-2.
- Quick, Michael (2023). Railway Passenger Stations in Great Britain: A Chronology (PDF) (5th ed.). London: Railway and Canal Historical Society.
