= Clitheroe railway station =

Railway station in Lancashire, England

Coordinates: 53°52′26″N 2°23′39″W

Clitheroe
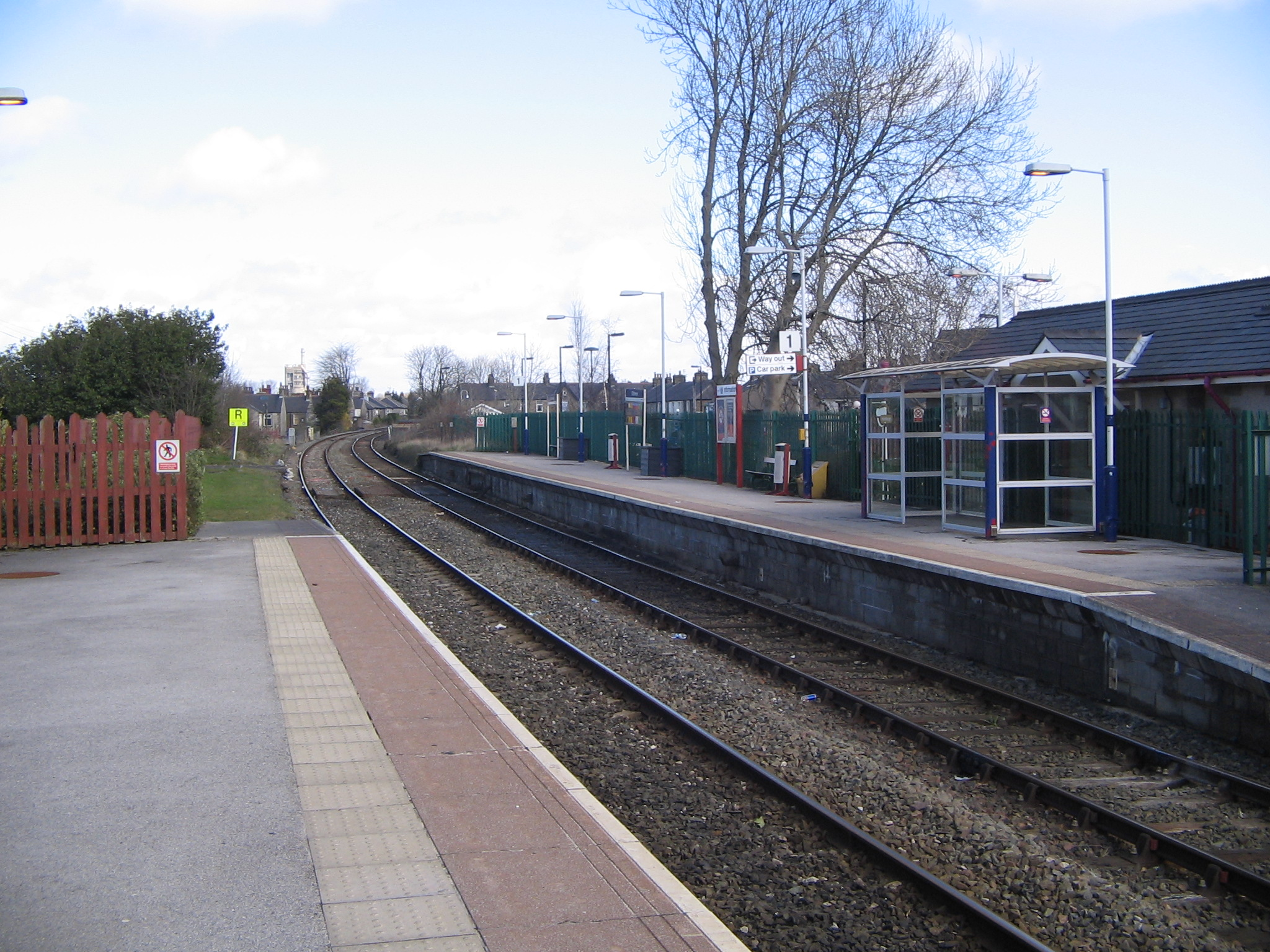
- Clitheroe railway station

General information
- Location: Clitheroe, Ribble Valley; England
- Grid reference: SD741419
- Manager: Northern Trains
- Platforms: 2

Other information
- Station code: CLH
- Classification: DfT category F2

Key dates
- 22 June 1850: Original station opened
- 1893/4: Station rebuilt
- 10 September 1962: Station closed
- 29 May 1994: Station reopened

Passengers
- 2020/21: ▼93,220
- 2021/22: ▲0.258 million
- 2022/23: ▲0.287 million
- 2023/24: ▼0.268 million
- 2024/25: ▼0.265 million
Location
Notes
- Passenger statistics from the Office of Rail and Road

Clitheroe railway station serves the town of Clitheroe in Lancashire, England. The station is situated on the Ribble Valley line, and is operated by Northern Trains. It is 10 miles (16 km) north of Blackburn. The station forms part of Clitheroe Interchange, which has won a number of awards.

== History ==
The original station opened on 22 June 1850. It was replaced in 1893–4 by another approximately 220 yards (200 m) to the north. The station closed to normal services on 10 September 1962 (that is, before the Beeching cuts) but remained in use for special services until 7 February 1971. The special services resumed on 14 May 1990, and the station was fully reopened on 29 May 1994, when passenger services began again from Blackburn.

The station has since become an award-winning bus and train transport interchange. The bus station, known as the Clitheroe Interchange, is the terminus for bus connections bringing passengers from towns and villages in the Ribble Valley area to the train service to Blackburn and Manchester. The Ribble Valley Line is a community railway line and is supervised by the Ribble Valley Rail group, which includes the train operator Northern.

== Facilities ==
The station had a ticket office, which was next to the old station building (which is used as an art gallery). The ticket office, operated by Lancashire County Council rather than operator Northern, permanently closed from February 2020. It was staffed Monday to Friday. All tickets must now be purchased via mobile device or from the ticket machine on Platform 1. There are waiting shelters on both platforms (which are offset from each other) and train running details are provided via digital screens, signage, customer help points and automatic announcements. Step-free access is available on both sides.

== Services ==
All train services are operated by Northern Trains. There is generally an hourly service daily from Clitheroe to Rochdale via Blackburn and Manchester Victoria with some extra trains during weekday peak hours.

For much of 2017 and 2018, Saturday and Sunday services to Manchester were either partially replaced by buses south of Bolton or diverted via Accrington and Todmorden while the Manchester to Preston Line was closed for electrification work.

On Sundays, one or two trains operated from Preston along the Ribble Valley Line via Clitheroe to Hellifield and onwards towards Carlisle via the Settle-Carlisle Line. This improves on the previous service that only ran in the summer. The Dales Rail service was suspended from the winter 2022 timetable change, but since June 2024 Northern has run an amended service, operating on Saturdays only. This service, branded as the "Yorkshire Dales Explorer", sees two return trips from Rochdale to Ribblehead via Manchester Victoria, Bolton and Clitheroe.

Preceding station	National Rail	Following station
Terminus	Northern Trains; Ribble Valley Line	Whalley
Hellifield; Limited service Saturdays only	Northern Trains; Ribble Valley Line	Whalley
	Historical railways	
Chatburn	Lancashire and Yorkshire Railway; Blackburn Railway	Whalley

== Bibliography ==
- Butt, R.V.J. (1995). The Directory of Railway Stations. Yeovil: Patrick Stephens Ltd. ISBN 1-85260-508-1. R508.
- Marshall, Geoff; Pipe, Vicki (2018). The Railway Adventures: Places, Trains, People and Stations. September Publishing. ISBN 978-1910463871.
- Welch, M.S. (2004) Lancashire Steam Finale, Runpast Publishing, Cheltenham, ISBN 1-870754-61-1
