= Bowland Forest High =

Civil parish in Lancashire, England

Coordinates: 53.946°N 2.520°W

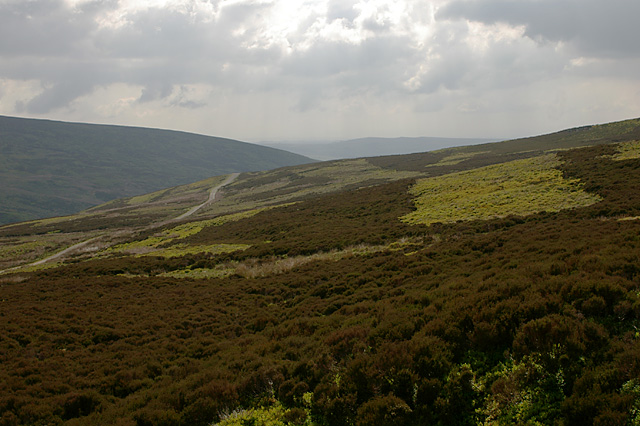
- Croasdale Fell

- Location in Ribble Valley Location in the Forest of Bowland Location within Lancashire
- Area: 79.7708 km^{2} (30.7997 sq mi)
- Population: 144 (2011)
  - Density: 2/km^{2} (5.2/sq mi)
- OS grid reference: SD659501
- Civil parish: Bowland Forest High
- District: Ribble Valley
- Shire county: Lancashire
- Region: North West
- Country: England
- Sovereign state: United Kingdom
- Post town: CLITHEROE
- Postcode district: BB7
- Dialling code: 01200
- Police: Lancashire
- Fire: Lancashire
- Ambulance: North West
- UK Parliament: Ribble Valley

Bowland Forest High is a civil parish in the Ribble Valley district of Lancashire, England, covering some 20,000 acres (80 km^{2}) of the Forest of Bowland. It fell within the ancient boundaries of the West Riding of Yorkshire. According to the 2001 census, the parish had a population of 163, falling to 144 at the 2011 Census. The parish includes the settlements of Hareden, Sykes, and Dunsop Bridge. It covers Sykes Fell, Whins Brow, Croasdale Fell and Wolfhole Crag. Before 1974, it formed part of Bowland Rural District in the West Riding of Yorkshire.

== History ==
Historic Bowland comprised a Royal Forest and a Liberty of ten manors spanning eight townships and four parishes and covered an area of almost 300 square miles (800 km^{2}) on the historic borders of Lancashire and Yorkshire. The manors within the Liberty were Slaidburn (Newton-in-Bowland, West Bradford, Grindleton), Knowlmere, Waddington, Easington, Bashall, Mitton, Withgill (Crook), Leagram (Bowland-with-Leagram), Hammerton and Dunnow (Battersby). Modern-day Bowland Forest is divided into two large administrative townships - Great Bowland (Bowland Forest High and Bowland Forest Low) and Little Bowland (Bowland-with-Leagram) - but the Forest was much more extensive in previous times.

St Hubert, the patron saint of hunting, is also patron saint of the Forest of Bowland and has a chapel dedicated to him in Dunsop Bridge. This chapel was founded by Richard Eastwood of Thorneyholme, land agent to the Towneley family. Eastwood was the last Bowbearer of the Forest of Bowland during the nineteenth century. An acclaimed breeder of racehorses and shorthorn cattle, he died in 1871 and is buried at St Hubert's.

== Media gallery ==
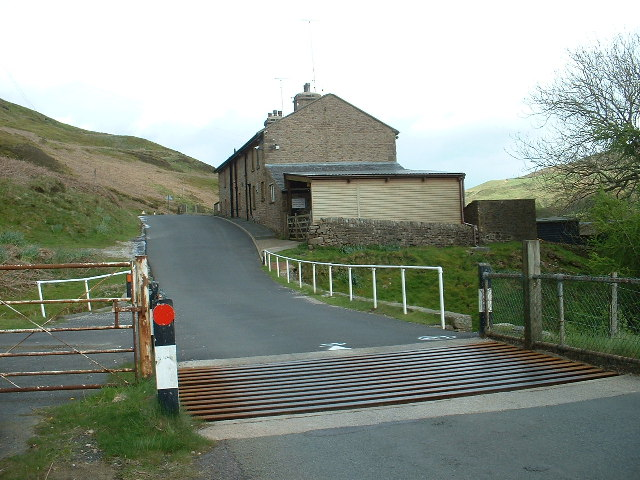
Bowland Mountain Rescue Team Centre.

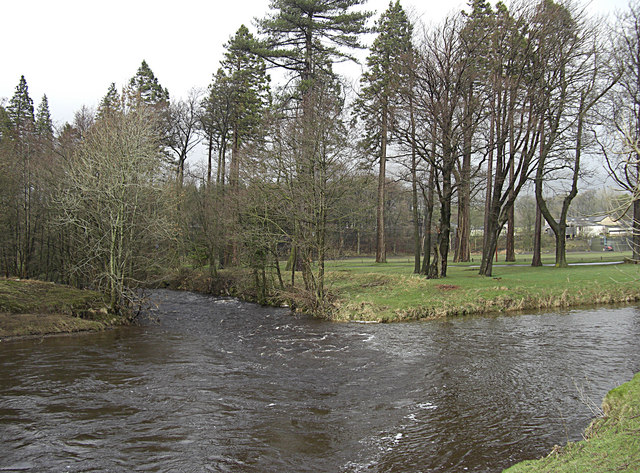
Confluence of the rivers Hodder and Dunsop.

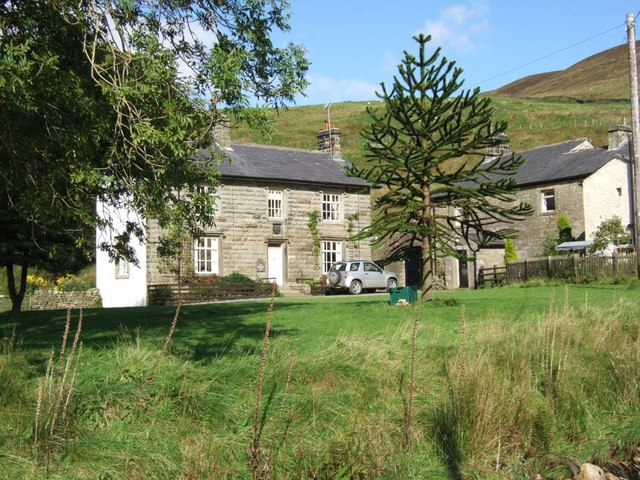
Whitendale Farm.

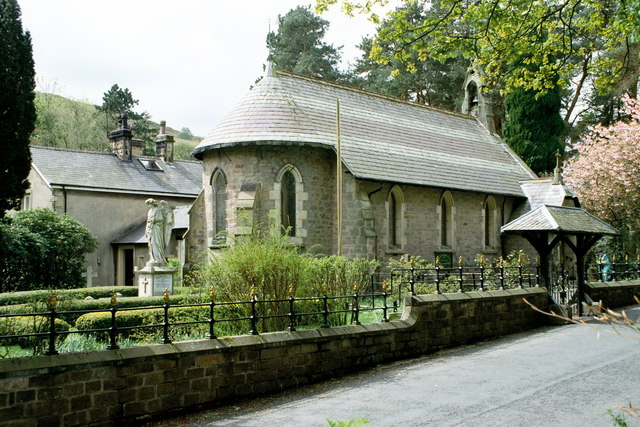
St Huberts RC Church, Dunsop Bridge.

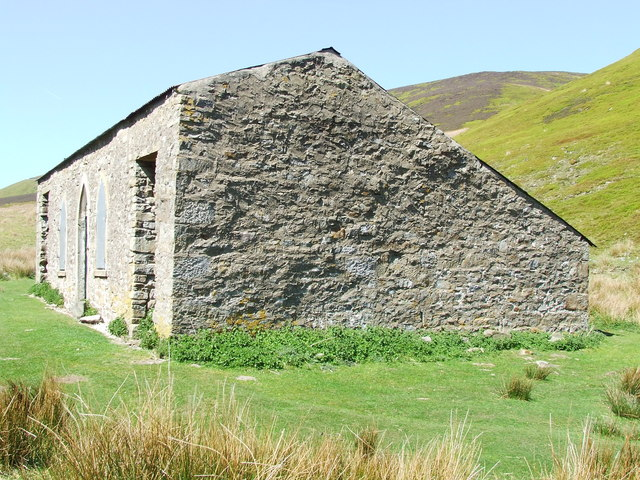
Langden Castle.

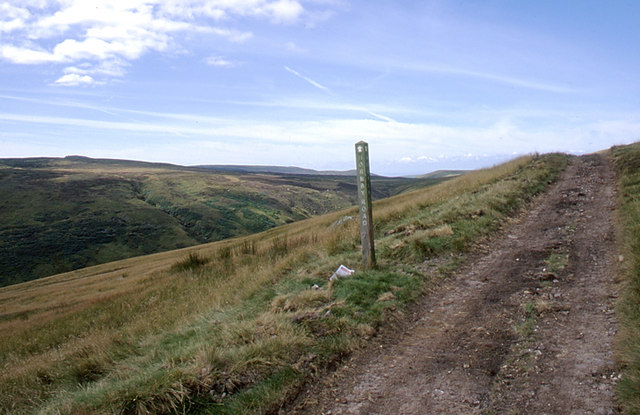
The Hornby Road.

== See also ==
- Listed buildings in Bowland Forest High
