= Bowland Rural District =

Former subdivision of Yorkshire, England

Coordinates: 53.913°N 2.490°W

Map of boundary as of 1971

Bowland was a rural district in the West Riding of Yorkshire from 1894 to 1974. It was named after the Forest of Bowland, which it included.

It was formed under the Local Government Act 1894 from that part of the Clitheroe rural sanitary district which was in Yorkshire (the rest becoming the Clitheroe Rural District in Lancashire).

The district was abolished in 1974 under the Local Government Act 1972. It was united with the Clitheroe Rural District (and some other territory), as part of the Ribble Valley district in the non-metropolitan county of Lancashire.

== Civil parishes ==
The district contained the following civil parishes during its existence:

- Bashall Eaves
- Bolton-by-Bowland
- Bowland Forest High
- Bowland Forest Low
- Easington
- Gisburn
- Gisburn Forest
- Great Mitton
- Grindleton
- Horton
- Middop
- Newsholme
- Newton
- Paythorne
- Rimington
- Sawley
- Slaidburn
- Waddington
- West Bradford
