= Honour of Clitheroe =

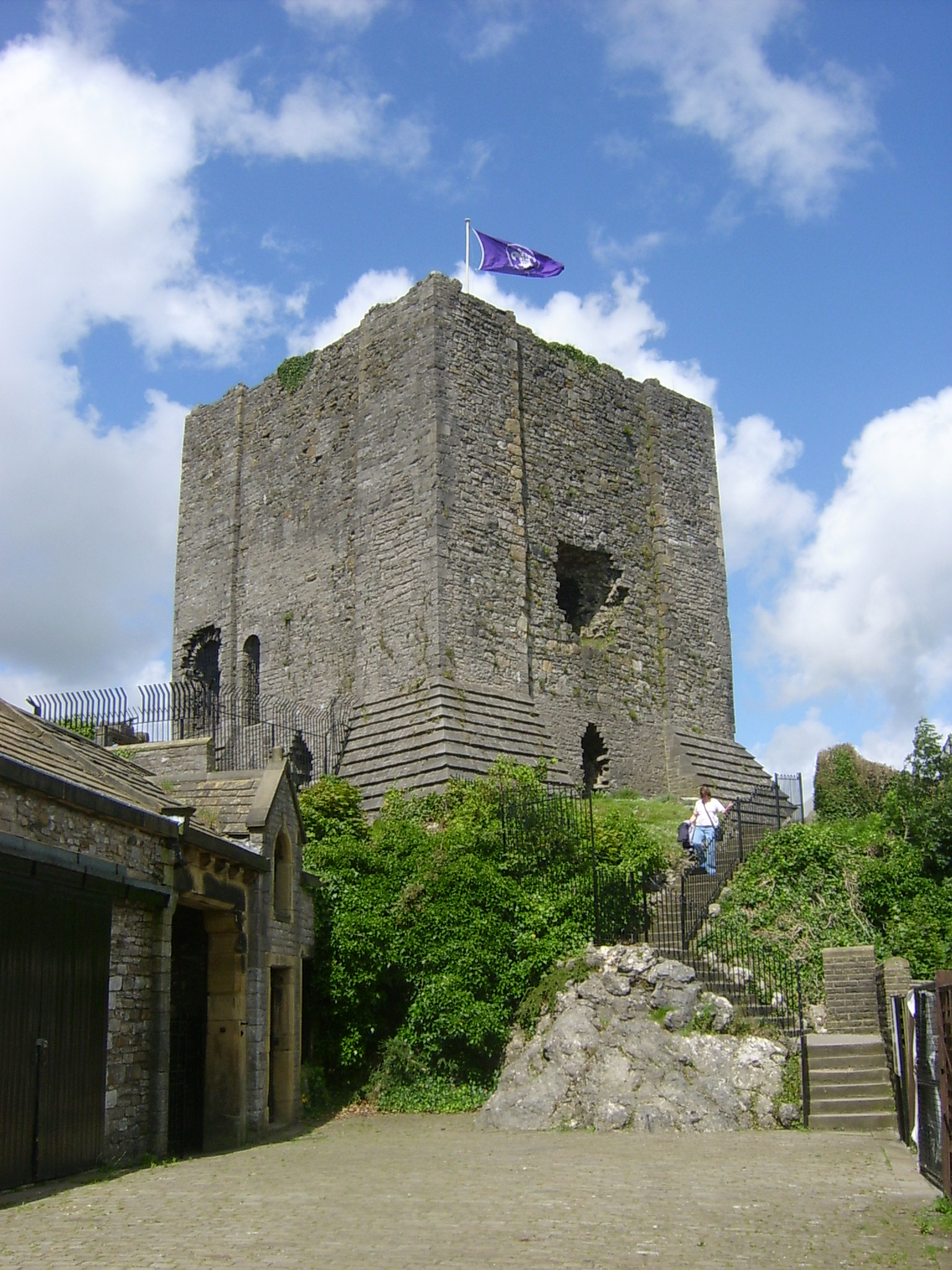
Clitheroe Castle, the caput of the Honour of Clitheroe

The Honour of Clitheroe is an ancient grouping of manors and royal forests centred on Clitheroe Castle in Lancashire, England; an honour traditionally being the grant of a large landholding complex, not all of whose parts are contiguous. In the case of Clitheroe, this complex was loosely clustered around the ancient wapentake of Blackburnshire.

== History ==
Before the Norman Conquest, the lands of Blackburnshire were held by Edward the Confessor, while Bowland was held by Tostig, son of Godwin, Earl of Wessex. In 1092, Roger de Poitou acquired a large part of what is now Lancashire, including the hundred of Blackburnshire.

By the end of the 11th century, Poitou's landholdings had been confiscated and came into the possession of the De Lacys, Barons of Pontefract and Lords of Bowland. In 1102, Henry I granted the fee of Blackburnshire and further holdings in Hornby, and the vills of Chipping, Aighton and Dutton in Amounderness to Robert de Lacy, 2nd Baron of Pontefract, while confirming his possession of Bowland. These lands formed the basis of what became known as the Honour of Clitheroe.

In 1205, Roger de Lacy purchased the barony of Penwortham and by 1212, he had added the manor of Rochdale. In 1235, his son John de Lacy, acquired the fee of Tottington from Henry de Monewden. The Honour passed by marriage from the De Lacys to Thomas, Earl of Lancaster in 1311 and subsequently, was incorporated into the Duchy of Lancaster. The honour had been among the lands acquired by Queen Isabella in 1327, after she deposed Edward II.

In 1507, King Henry VII's Act of Disafforestation was a response to growing encroachment on the Royal Forests and paved the way for increased settlement within the Forests of Accrington, Bowland, Pendle, Rossendale and Trawden. In 1625, Charles I sold Rochdale to trustees for the Earl of Holderness, and in 1628, the manor of Penwortham was also sold.

In 1661, King Charles II granted the Honour to General George Monck, 1st Duke of Albemarle, in recognition of his support during the Restoration. It then followed the inheritance of the Dukes of Albemarle, Dukes of Montagu and finally, the Dukes of Buccleuch. In 1827, the 5th Duke of Buccleuch inherited the Honour through his grandmother, the 3rd Duchess, but this was entailed upon his uncle, Henry James Montagu-Scott, 2nd Baron Montagu of Boughton. In 1835, the Bowland portion was sold to Peregrine Towneley.

Lord Henry Douglas-Scott-Montagu, great-nephew of the 2nd Baron Montagu of Boughton, and second son of the 5th Duke of Buccleuch, inherited the Honour in 1845. In 1896, he set up the Clitheroe Estate Company as a vehicle for the exploitation of coal and other mineral wealth, within the lands of the Honour. In 1938, the Towneley family sold the Bowland portion back to the Duchy of Lancaster. The Coal Act 1938 and subsequent nationalisation of the British coal industry led to the voluntary winding-up of the Company in 1945. In April that year, Tory MP Ralph Assheton, later 1st Baron Clitheroe, bought the residue of the land holdings from the company for £12,500. Since 1945, the Barons Clitheroe have styled themselves Lords of the Honor of Clitheroe; more formally, their legal style of address being "Lords of the Various Manors and Forests within the Honor of Clitheroe".

== Governance ==
Before the Tenures Abolition Act 1660, which effectively introduced the concept of freehold into English law, the Lord of the Honour was lord paramount over all the mesne lords of the Honour. He exercised governance of the Honour through manorial and forest courts.

The Great Court Leet for Blackburnshire was originally held every three weeks at Clitheroe Castle, with the Steward of the Honour presiding. It had jurisdiction over the mesne manors of the Wapentake of Blackburn and within the Borough of Clitheroe, but not within the demesne manors, such as Slaidburn in the Forest of Bowland, which convened their own halmote (manorial) courts.

The forest areas within the Honour were governed under forest law and jurisdiction was exercised through woodmote and swainmote courts. In the main, these appear to have been held at the demesne manor closest to the forest in question. The Forest of Bowland was a notable exception. In Bowland, for historic reasons, a strict jurisdictional divide was observed between governance of the Forest of Bowland which was centred on Whitewell and governance of the Liberty of Bowland centred on Slaidburn. This was a consequence of the shift of the caput of the Lordship of Bowland from Grindleton to Slaidburn in the second half of the fourteenth century.

Manorial courts fell into disuse in the early 1920s; forest law was only repealed in the 1970s but in the case of Bowland, its forest courts had effectively ceased to operate during the 1830s.

== Manors and Forests within the Honour ==
Through subinfeudation, the manorial structure of the Honour shifted over the course of nine centuries. Whitaker in Chapter 2 of his 1872 History of Whalley, Vol 1, p. 238, claims there were 28 manors within the Honour on the basis that these were all the manors of Blackburnshire.

=== Manors ===
- Slaidburn sold in 1835; reincorporated into Honour in 1950, comprising:

Land in Slaidburn, West Bradford, Grindleton and Newton-in-Bowland

- Accrington (later known as Accrington Old Hold), comprising:

Land in Accrington and Oswaldtwistle, and the dependent manors of Haslingden and Huncoat

- Accrington New Hold, created in 1507, comprising:

The remnant of the Forests of Accrington and Rossendale

- Colne, comprising:

Land in Colne, Foulridge and Great Marsden

- Ightenhill, comprising:

Land in Ightenhill, Briercliffe, Burnley, Habergham Eaves, Little Marsden, Padiham and Heyhouses

- Chatburn, Worston and Pendleton

Originally separate manors, but more recently joined as one.

- Rochdale purchased 1212; sold 1625
- Tottington acquired 1235
- Penwortham purchased 1205; sold 1628
- Downham sold in 1558; reincorporated into Honour in 1945
- Wapentake of Blackburn, comprising:

Land in Clitheroe, Chipping, Cliviger, Read, Simonstone and Blackburn

=== Forests ===
- Forest of Bowland sold 1835
- Forest of Blackburnshire, comprising:

Forest of Trawden
Forest of Pendle
Forest of Rossendale - Cowpe, Lench, and Musbury where added to the forest after the acquisition of Tottington.
Forest of Accrington (became Manor of Accrington New Hold after 1507)
Hoddlesden (including Yate Bank and Pickup Bank)- Originally on the western edge of the Forest of Rossendale, due to the development of Haslingden, Hoddlesden was cut off from the main body of the forest by the late thirteenth century. In 1296, it is recorded as a single vaccary (medieval cattle farm), and seems to have continued as such until the disafforesting.

== Stewards of the Honor of Clitheroe ==
Stewards of the Honor of Clitheroe were traditionally based at Clitheroe Castle in an office where the Castle Museum now stands. Before the twentieth century, they were known as Gentlemen Stewards of the Honor of Clitheroe and are traditionally appointed by deed poll:

- Laurence Robinson (fl.1750)
- John Barcroft (fl. 1780)
- Martin Richardson (fl. 1800)
- William Carr (fl. 1810)
- Thomas Carr (fl. 1825)
- Dixon Robinson (1836 to 1878)
- Arthur Ingram Robinson (fl. 1890)
- Frederick Dixon Robinson (fl. 1920)
- Arthur John Dixon Robinson (fl. 1940)
- Geoffrey Nicholas Robinson (fl. 1960)
- Kenneth Shaw (fl.1975)
- Robert Michael Parkinson (fl. 2000)
- Brian Rawson Rycroft (appointed 2010)
- Thomas Iain Manson (appointed 2019 at Lancaster Castle by Deed Poll)

In recent years, the Steward of the Honor has been a partner at Clitheroe-based land agents Ingham & Yorke. From 1991, the Steward was Michael Parkinson. Parkinson formally retired in 2010. Subsequently, he was appointed Chief Steward of the Forest of Bowland in 2011 by its feudal lord, William Bowland.
