= West Bradford =

West Bradford may refer to:

- West Bradford Township, Pennsylvania
- West Bradford, Lancashire
- Bradford West
