= Stocks Reservoir =

Reservoir in Lancashire, England

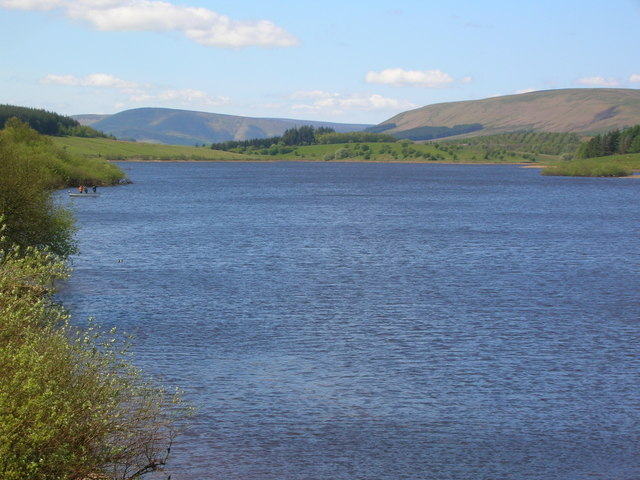

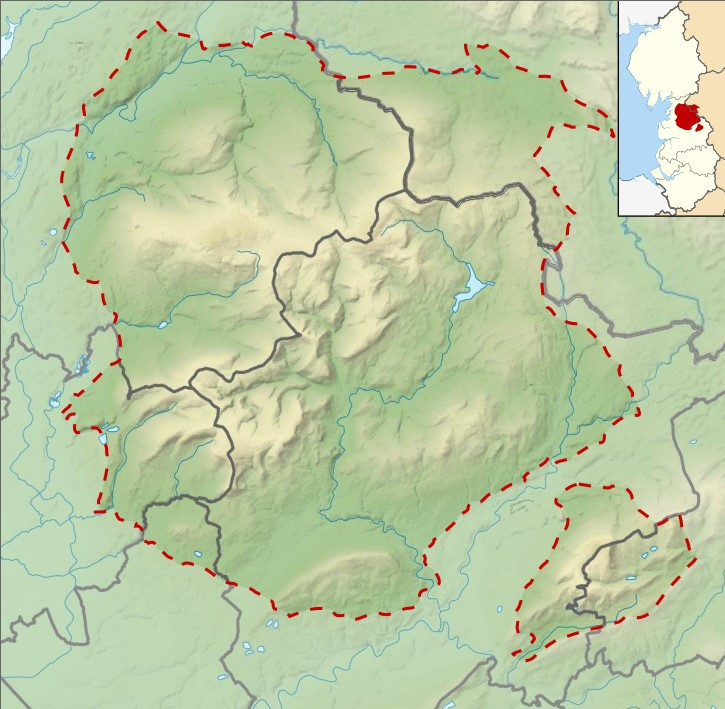
- Location in the Forest of Bowland Location in Ribble Valley Borough Location in Lancashire
- Location: Lancashire
- Coordinates: 53°59′45″N 2°24′50″W
- Type: reservoir
- Primary inflows: River Hodder & Hasgil Beck
- Primary outflows: River Hodder
- Basin countries: England, United Kingdom
- Surface area: 1.92 km^{2} (0.74 sq mi)
- Max. depth: 31.4 m (103 ft)
- Water volume: 12,000,000 m^{3} (420,000,000 cu ft)
- Islands: "Bird Island"
- Settlements: Slaidburn and Tosside

Stocks Reservoir is a reservoir situated at the head of the Hodder valley in the Forest of Bowland, Lancashire, England (historically in the West Riding of Yorkshire until 1974). It provides water mainly for Blackpool and the Fylde coast. The reservoir has a fly fishing club which is very popular in the summer months and a small cafe which is popular with walkers. The Board House is a building used for meetings by United Utilities and is located on the western shores of the reservoir, near the Hodder Water Treatment Works. Stocks Reservoir was opened on 5 July 1932 by Prince George, KG.

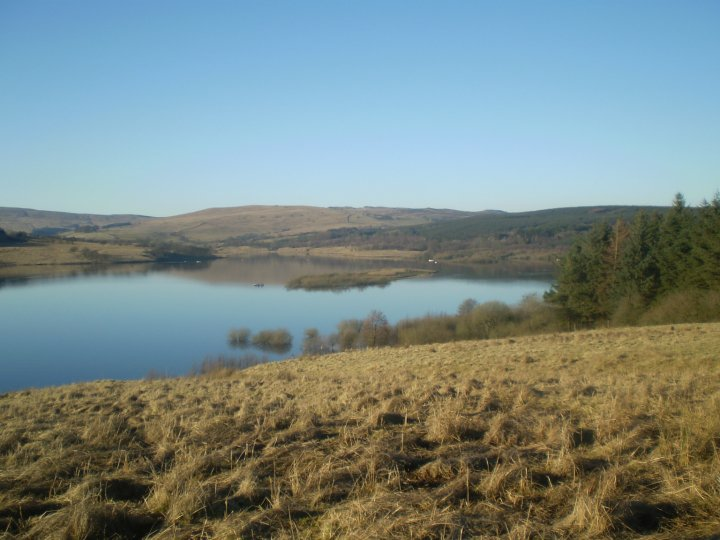
Stocks Reservoir

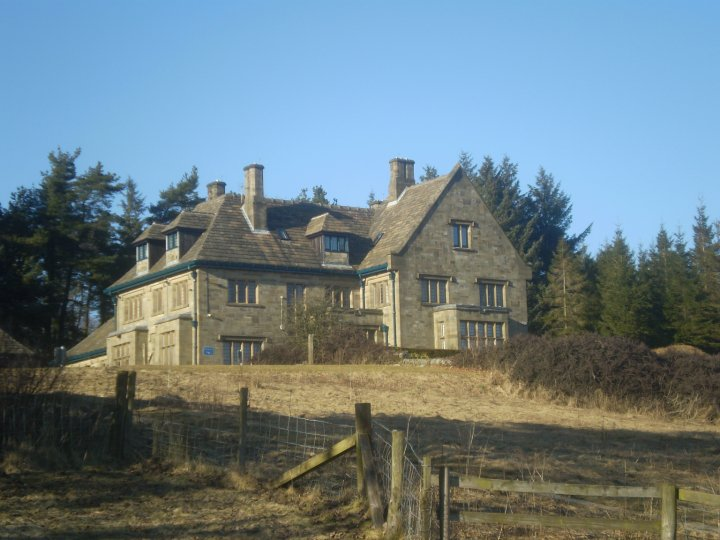
The Board House

== History ==
It was created in 1932 by the Fylde Water Board by flooding the Dalehead valley and the surrounding farmland, including the hamlet of Stocks-in-Bowland from which the reservoir derives its name. At the peak of the construction project, over 500 men worked there and most of them lived in a temporary village called Hollins. Prince George officially opened the reservoir by unveiling a commemorative bronze plaque.

During the construction phase, the reservoir works were the site of an extensive 3 foot (914 mm) gauge industrial railway system which linked the dam works with a railhead on the Long Preston - Slaidburn road (Bowtell, 1988). Nearby stone quarries were also served by the railway. Steam traction engines hauled building material between the Tosside railhead and the water board depôt adjacent to Long Preston railway station.

The reservoir is located in the civil parish of Easington. In medieval times, the area was granted to the monks of Kirkstall Abbey near Leeds. Later, Stocks-in-Bowland, Dalehead and Easington all came under the sway of the Lordship of Bowland.
