= Waddington, Lancashire =

Village in Lancashire, England

Coordinates: 53.887°N 2.417°W

Waddington
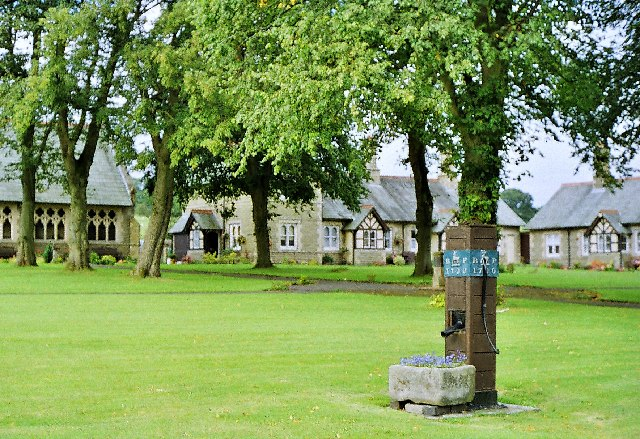
- Waddington Almshouses

- Shown within Ribble Valley Location within Lancashire
- Population: 1,028 (2011)
- OS grid reference: SD725435
- Civil parish: Waddington
- District: Ribble Valley
- Shire county: Lancashire
- Region: North West
- Country: England
- Sovereign state: United Kingdom
- Post town: CLITHEROE
- Postcode district: BB7
- Dialling code: 01200
- Police: Lancashire
- Fire: Lancashire
- Ambulance: North West
- UK Parliament: Ribble Valley

Waddington is a small village, 2 miles (3 km) north-west of Clitheroe in the Ribble Valley, Lancashire, England. The population of the civil parish at the 2011 census was 1,028. Waddington lies just within the Bowland Rural District of the historic West Riding of Yorkshire. It covers approximately 2000 acres of the Forest of Bowland.

== Amenities ==
It is home to both an Anglican church and a Methodist church, a social club with bowling green, a cafe, a playing field on which both cricket and football are played. Also, within the village there are three pubs, the Lower Buck Inn, the Higher Buck and the Waddington Arms. The village is a regular winner of the Lancashire Best Kept Village awards.

== History ==
Waddington was a mesne manor of the ancient Lordship of Bowland which comprised a Royal Forest and a Liberty of ten manors. These spanned eight townships and four parishes, covering an area of almost 300 square miles (780 km^{2}) on the historic borders of Lancashire and Yorkshire. The manors within the Liberty were Slaidburn (Newton-in-Bowland, West Bradford, Grindleton), Knowlmere, Waddington, Easington, Bashall Eaves, Mitton, Withgill (Crook), Leagram, Hammerton and Dunnow (Battersby).

The Tempests were lords of the manor of Waddington from at least the early thirteenth century. The family is credited with endowing the parish church at Waddington. One of their number, Sir Nicholas Tempest, a Bowbearer of the Forest of Bowland, was hanged, drawn and quartered at Tyburn in 1537 for his part in the Pilgrimage of Grace.

Following his defeat in the Battle of Hexham during the Wars of the Roses on 15 May 1464, King Henry VI was sheltered by Lancastrian supporters at houses across the north of England. Following stays at Muncaster Castle on the Cumbrian coast and at nearby Bolton Hall, he went into hiding at Waddington Hall, the home of Sir Richard Tempest. He was betrayed by "a black monk of Addington" and on 13 July 1465, a group of Yorkist men, including Sir Richard's brother John, entered the home to arrest him. Henry fled into nearby woods but was soon captured.

Waddington almshouses were endowed by Robert Parker of Browsholme Hall in 1700. St Helen's Church, which was rebuilt in 1825, has monuments to the Parker family.

== Governance ==
Along with West Bradford, Grindleton and Sawley, the parish forms the Waddington and West Bradford ward of Ribble Valley Borough Council. The ward had a population of 2,636 in 2001, rising to 2,933 in 2011. The ward elects two councillors, who currently are Paul Elms and Bridget Hilton, both of the Conservative Party.

== Media gallery ==
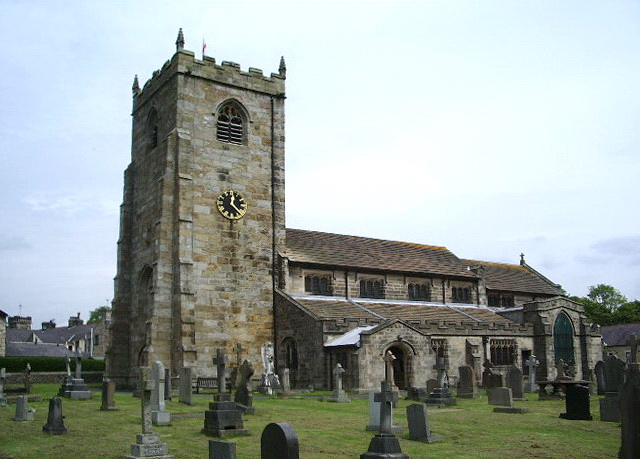
The Parish Church of St Helen

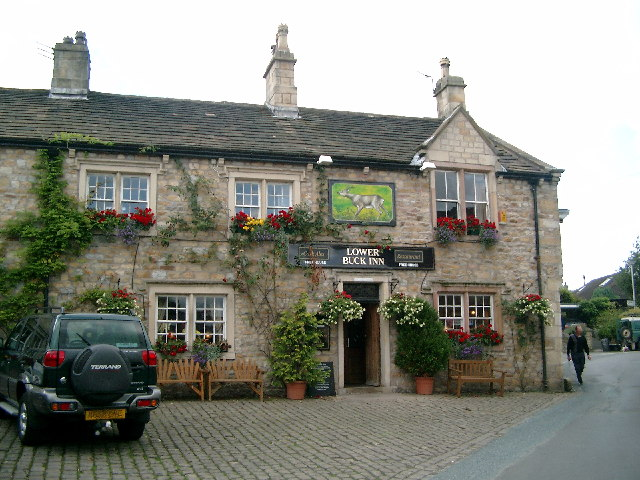
The Lower Buck Inn

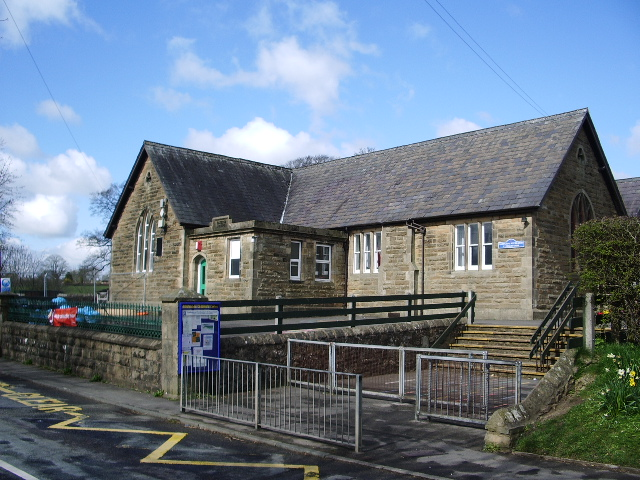
Waddington and West Bradford Primary School

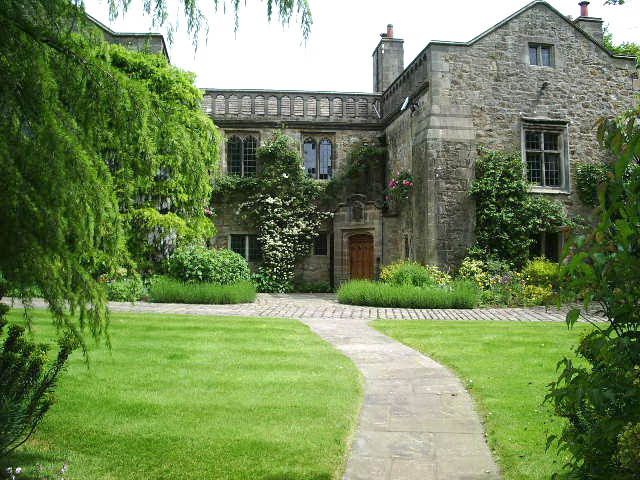
Waddington Old Hall

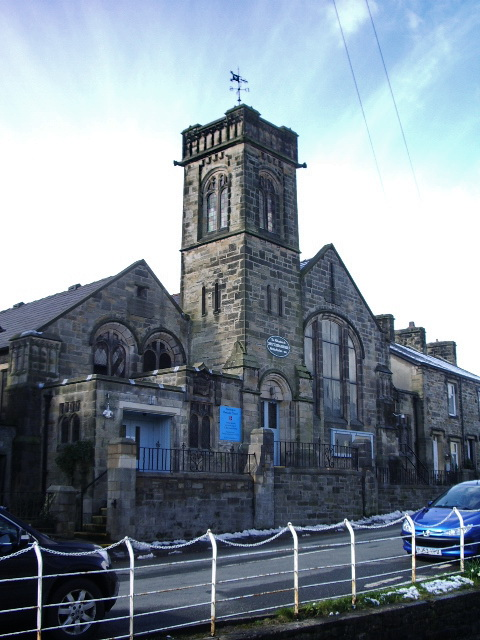
Waddington Methodist Church

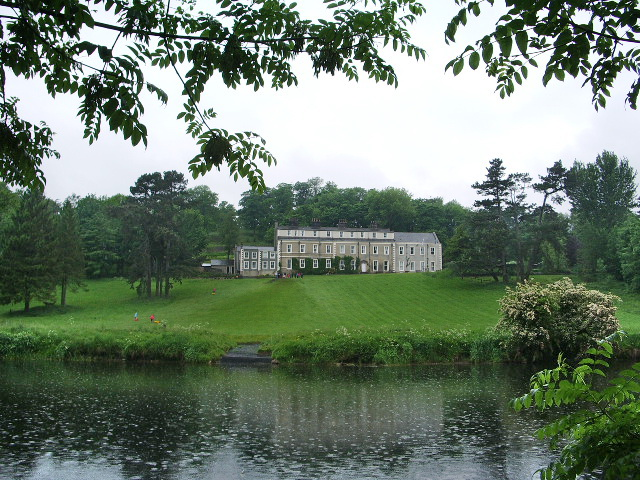
Waddow Hall

== See also ==
- Listed buildings in Waddington, Lancashire
