= Slaidburn =

Village in Lancashire, England

Coordinates: 53.967°N 2.435°W

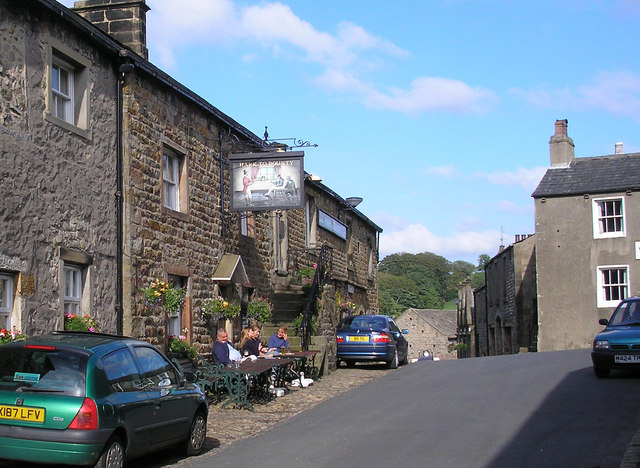
- The Hark to Bounty

- Location in Ribble Valley Borough Location in the Forest of Bowland Location within Lancashire
- Population: 351 (2011 Census)
- OS grid reference: SD715525
- Civil parish: Slaidburn
- District: Ribble Valley
- Shire county: Lancashire
- Region: North West
- Country: England
- Sovereign state: United Kingdom
- Post town: CLITHEROE
- Postcode district: BB7
- Dialling code: 01200
- Police: Lancashire
- Fire: Lancashire
- Ambulance: North West
- UK Parliament: Ribble Valley

Slaidburn (/ˈslɛdbərn/) is a village and civil parish within the Ribble Valley district of Lancashire, England. The parish covers just over 5,000 acres of the Forest of Bowland.

Historically in the West Riding of Yorkshire, Slaidburn lies near the head of the River Hodder and Stocks Reservoir, both within the Forest of Bowland, an Area of Outstanding Natural Beauty. Farming is still a major employer, but the area attracts tourists, for walking in particular. The civil parish of Slaidburn shares a parish council with Easington, a rural parish to the north of Slaidburn.

According to the 2001 census, the parish had a population of 288. The United Kingdom Census 2011 grouped the parish with Easington (2001 pop. 52), giving a total of 351.

The parish church of St Andrew has a Jacobean screen and a Georgian pulpit. The brass band composer William Rimmer (1862–1936) composed the now-popular march, named Slaidburn after the village, for the Slaidburn Silver Band. A new village hall opened to much fanfare and is well used. There is a local pub, the Hark to Bounty, which upstairs houses the ancient halmote or courthouse of the Manor of Slaidburn.

== History ==
From early times, the Manor of Slaidburn formed part of the ancient Lordship of Bowland, being held in demesne from the second half of the 14th century.

The Lordship of Bowland comprised a royal forest and a liberty of ten manors spanning eight townships and four parishes and covered an area of almost 300 square miles (800 km^{2}) on the historic borders of Lancashire and Yorkshire. The manors within the liberty were Slaidburn (Newton-in-Bowland, West Bradford, Grindleton), Knowlmere, Waddington, Easington, Bashall, Mitton, Withgill (Crook), Leagram (Bowland-with-Leagram), Hammerton and Dunnow (Battersby).

There was a major manorial reorganisation of Bowland in the second half of the 14th century, which may have been precipitated by a fall in population caused by the Black Death (1348–50) but was probably also a consequence of the absorption of Bowland into the Duchy of Lancaster. Among other changes, this saw Newton subsumed into the demesne of Slaidburn and the manorial caput shift from Grindleton to Slaidburn.

Two of the Lord of Bowland's mesne manors – Battersby (Dunnow) and Knowlmere – fell within the bounds of the township of Newton but did not become part of the demesne of Slaidburn. See Newton-in-Bowland for further information.

According to a leading local historian, the historic Manor and Liberty of Slaidburn covered a wide area, not equivalent to the Slaidburn parish boundaries, but comprising the villages and town fields of Slaidburn and Newton-in-Bowland, including Ingbreak, a town field to the west of Slaidburn village; Raw Moor, part of the enclosed land of 1619 north of Slaidburn village in the Croasdale area; Brunghill Moor, Burn Moor and Dunsop, also enclosed in 1619 and near Back Lane and Burn Hill; Champion, also enclosed in 1619 and to the east of Slaidburn village; Woodhouse, to the north west of Slaidburn village; Youlstone Wood, also enclosed in 1619, and to the south of Newton village; and most of West Bradford and Grindleton villages and their town fields.

Title to the Manor and Liberty of Slaidburn, West Bradford and Grindleton, including the township of Newton-in-Bowland, was bought by Tory MP, Ralph Assheton, later first Baron Clitheroe, in 1950. In 1977, his second son, the Hon. Nicholas Assheton, was granted title. Since 2003, the Lord of the Manor and Liberty of Slaidburn has been Thomas Assheton, son of the Hon. Nicholas Assheton and nephew of the second Baron Clitheroe.

The Steward to the Manor and Liberty of Slaidburn is Thomas Manson who was appointed in 2019. He is a partner at the Clitheroe-based firm of Chartered Surveyors and Land Agents, Ingham and Yorke. His predecessor, Michael Parkinson, formerly advised the Lord of Bowland as the Chief Steward of the Forest of Bowland.

== Governance ==
Historically administered as part of the Honour of Clitheroe for a long period, Dixon Robinson being the most prominent of the administrators. Along with Bowland Forest Low, Newton, Easington and Bolton-by-Bowland, the parish forms the Bowland, Newton and Slaidburn ward of Ribble Valley Borough Council. The ward had a population of 1,243 in 2001, rising to 1,325 in 2011. The ward elects a single councillor, who currently is Joan Elms of the Conservative Party.

== Geography ==
The Roman road known as Watling Street, that runs from Manchester via Ribchester to Carlisle, passes in a NNE direction to the west of the village before turning NW on Low Fell. This section is also known as the Hornby Road.

The River Hodder flows through the parish, joined by Croasdale Brook on the eastern edge of the village.

To commemorate the 400th anniversary of the trials of the Pendle witches, a new long-distance walking route called the Lancashire Witches Walk has been created. Ten tercet waymarkers, designed by Stephen Raw, each inscribed with a verse of a poem by Carol Ann Duffy have been installed along the route, with the fifth located here.

== People ==
- Thomas Sanderson, (1793–1878), farmer of Woodhouse, Slaidburn. He was also for many years Overseer of the Poor for the Slaidburn District and an Officer of HM Customs & Excise. In 1850, he and his wife Frances (née Bland – sister of the Rev Stephen Bland of St. Wilfrid's Church, Burnsall in Craven) and their children emigrated to Wisconsin, USA, on the SS Arctic, where several of his sons rose to prominence – see below.

- Robert B. Sanderson, (1825–1887), Wisconsin senator who became one of the largest sheep breeders in Texas
- Thomas Sanderson (Wisconsin politician) (1827–1912), farmer and state legislator/politician.
- Jonathan Sanderson, (1837–1914), known as the Pioneer Giant of Nebraska, standing six feet nine inches tall. Whilst he and his wife were still newcomers in Nebraska William F. Cody (Buffalo Bill) and a scout stopped by and asked for shelter during a storm. They stayed two or three days playing cards and repairing and cleaning their guns. He was in the area as there had been some fighting on the Little Blue River about 20 miles south of the Sanderson home.
- Joseph Sanderson, (1841–1914), Wisconsin farmer and state legislator/politician. He was very active in support of legislation beneficial to agricultural interests.

- Robert Parker (1731–1796), a prominent lawyer and attorney of Halifax, Yorkshire, was born at Gamble Hole Farm in Newton in Bowland. He was baptised at Slaidburn Parish Church in March 1731 (1732 new style), the son of George Parker, a yeoman farmer. He is most famous for investigating and identifying the Cragg Vale Coiners who clipped gold and silver coins. He was also the attorney of choice for the owners of many of the large Yorkshire landed estates.
- James Radley (1884–1959), one of the first English aviators, was born at Dunnow Hall in Slaidburn.
- Tempest Slinger (1683–1728), prominent lawyer and attorney of Gray's Inn and Lincoln's Inn, London, and whose practice was the beginning of the law firm Farrer & Co, the Queen's solicitors, was born at Dunnow Hall in Slaidburn in 1683, the son of Nicholas Slinger.

== Ancient parish ==
The historic parish of Slaidburn comprised the townships of Bowland Forest High, Easington, Newton and Slaidburn itself.

=== Church ===
The church of St Andrew was built in the Perpendicular style: the powerful stone tower contrasts with the long, low, rendered walls of the nave and aisles. There is a fine interior with a great variety of box and bench pews ranging in date from the 17th to the 19th century. The font-cover is Elizabethan, the screen Jacobean and the three-decker pulpit is Georgian. The church is recorded in the National Heritage List for England as a designated Grade I listed building, having been listed in 1954.

== Media gallery ==
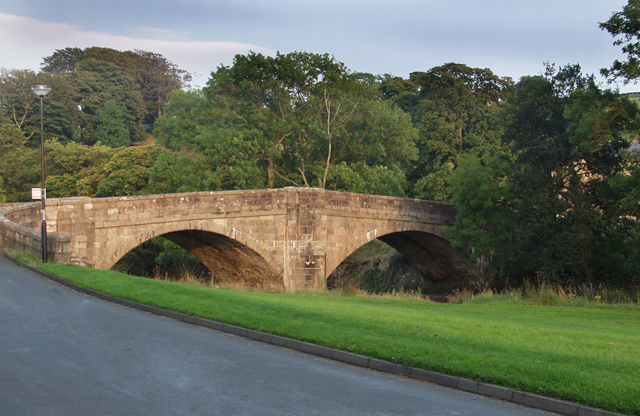
Slaidburn Bridge

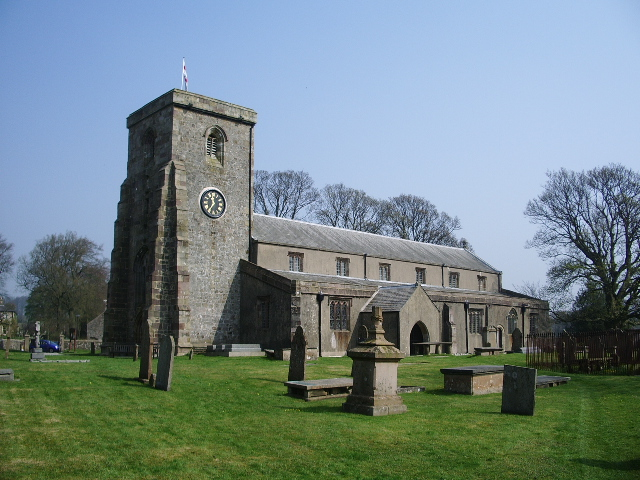
St Andrew's Church

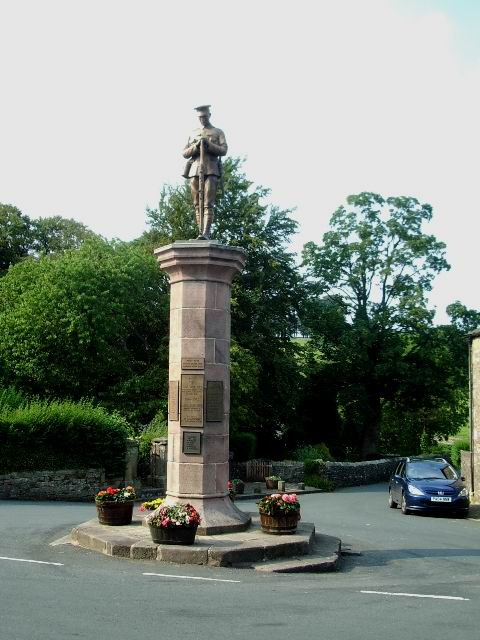
Slaidburn War Memorial

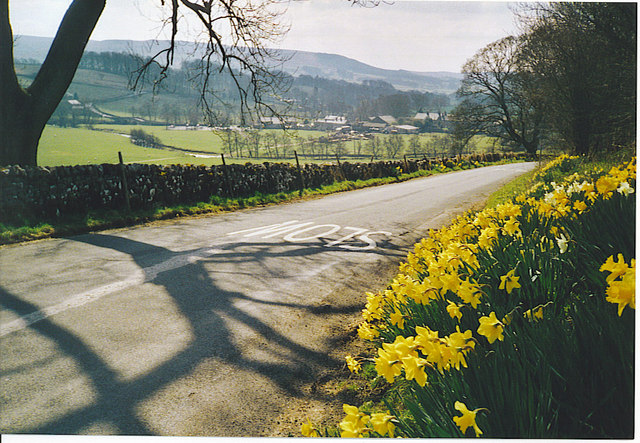
Slaidburn from the north

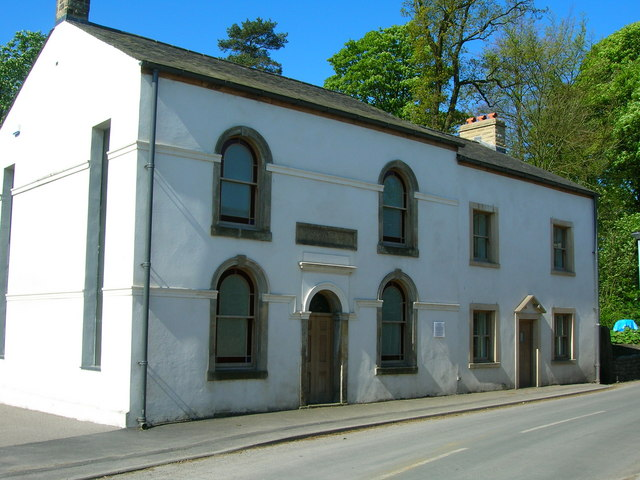
Slaidburn Village Hall

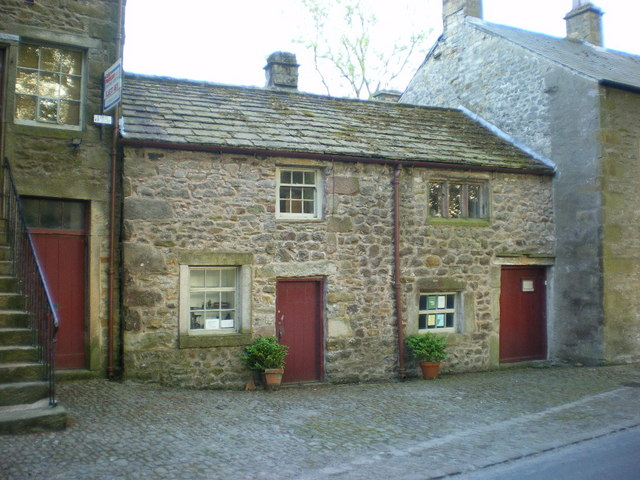
Slaidburn Heritage Centre

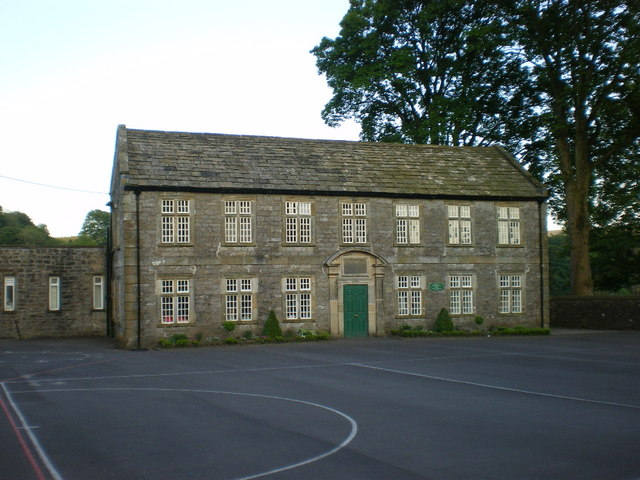
Brennand's Endowed School

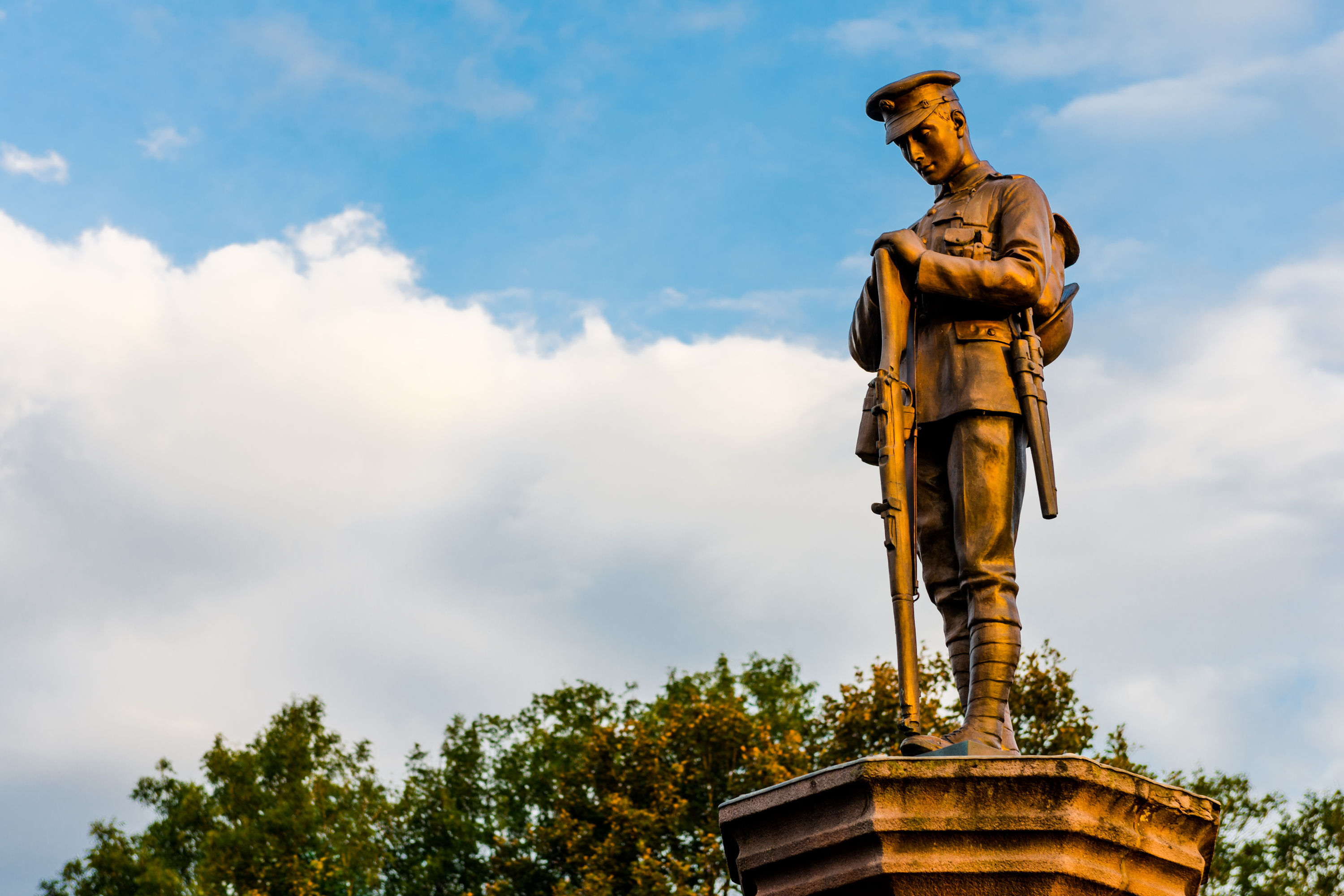
Mourning Soldier War Memorial

== See also ==
- Listed buildings in Slaidburn
- Staincliffe Wapentake
