= Great Mitton =

Village in Lancashire, England

Coordinates: 53.846°N 2.435°W

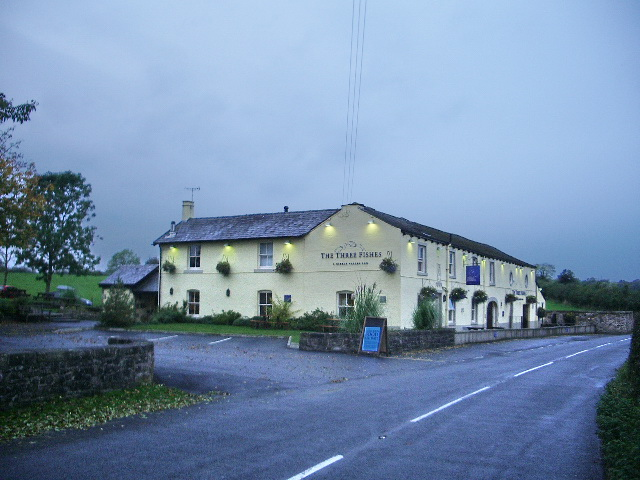
- The Three Fishes

- Shown within Ribble Valley Location within Lancashire
- Population: 266 (2011 Census)
- OS grid reference: SD715385
- Civil parish: Great Mitton
- District: Ribble Valley
- Shire county: Lancashire
- Region: North West
- Country: England
- Sovereign state: United Kingdom
- Post town: CLITHEROE
- Postcode district: BB7
- Dialling code: 01254/01200
- Police: Lancashire
- Fire: Lancashire
- Ambulance: North West
- UK Parliament: Ribble Valley

Great Mitton is a village and a civil parish in the Ribble Valley, Lancashire, England. It is separated from the civil parish of Little Mitton by the River Ribble, both lie about three miles from the town of Clitheroe. The combined population of both civil parishes at the 2011 census was 266. In total, Great and Little Mitton cover less than 2000 acres of the Forest of Bowland, making it the smallest township in the Forest. Historically, the village is part of the West Riding of Yorkshire, but was transferred to Lancashire for administrative purposes on 1 April 1974, under the provisions of the Local Government Act 1972.

Great Mitton has an ancient church, All Hallows, an ancient manor house and a pub, The Three Fishes, where in former times manorial courts were held. A second pub, The Aspinall Arms, sits across the Ribble in Little Mitton.

The ancient parish of Mitton took its name from the Old English, being a settlement at the mythe, the confluence of the Hodder and Ribble Rivers.

== History ==
The Domesday manor of Mitton encompassed both Great and Little Mitton, straddling lands on both sides of the Ribble. From the late eleventh century, it fell under the Lordship of Bowland, the Lords of Bowland being lords paramount of a Royal Forest and a Liberty of ten manors spanning eight townships and four parishes and which covered an area of almost 300 square miles (780 km^{2}) on the historic borders of Lancashire and Yorkshire. The manors within the Liberty were Slaidburn (Newton-in-Bowland, West Bradford, Grindleton), Knowlmere, Waddington, Easington, Bashall Eaves, Mitton, Withgill (Crook), Leagram, Hammerton and Dunnow (Battersby).

Mitton was a mesne manor from the early twelfth century. Its first lord, Radulphus le Rus, may have been a scion of the de Lacy family. Descendants of Radulphus assumed the surname de Mitton. In the late thirteenth century, the family adopted the surname de Sotheron, later Sherburne, by marriage, thereby laying the foundation for the dynasty of Shireburne of Stonyhurst. The manor passed out of Shireburne ownership in the fourteenth century but was re-acquired in 1665. With the extinction of the Shireburne male line in 1717, the manor passed to the Hawksworth and finally, Aspinall families.

The Mitton Hoard of eleven medieval silver coins (or bits of coins) was found to the west of the village near the River Hodder. The coins are now in Clitheroe Castle Museum.

The manor of Withgill (Crook) lay within the boundaries of the township of Mitton but was small (around 40 acres in 1258). It was held by the de Bury family until the late fourteenth century. The Singletons held the manor from 1379-1503 after which it passed to the family of Sir William Leyland and finally, the Tyldesleys. The Tyldesleys, leading Jacobites, forfeited the manor for their role in the 1715 Preston Rebellion.

The historical Parish of Great Mitton comprised the townships of Old Laund Booth, and Aighton, Bailey and Chaigley in Blackburnshire, and the chapelries of Grindleton and Waddington, and townships of Bashall Eaves, West Bradford in Staincliffe and Mitton itself which straddled the two.

Sir William Addison (1905–1992), historian and author, was born at Milton.

== Governance ==
The civil parish of Great Mitton was created from the ancient township with the same name in 1866.

Great Mitton was part of the West Riding of Yorkshire until it ceased to exist as an administrative entity in 1974. The parish currently shares a parish council with the neighbouring civil parishes of Bashall Eaves and Little Mitton.

== Church ==
All Hallows Church (previously known as the Church of St Michael) was built in the 13th century, with 15th and 16th century additions. It contains Shireburne of Stonyhurst family tombs. Since 1954, it has been designated a Grade I listed building by English Heritage.

== Gallery ==
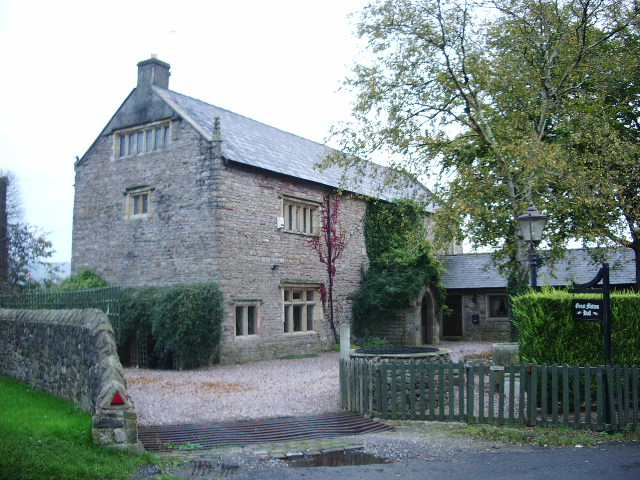
Great Mitton Hall

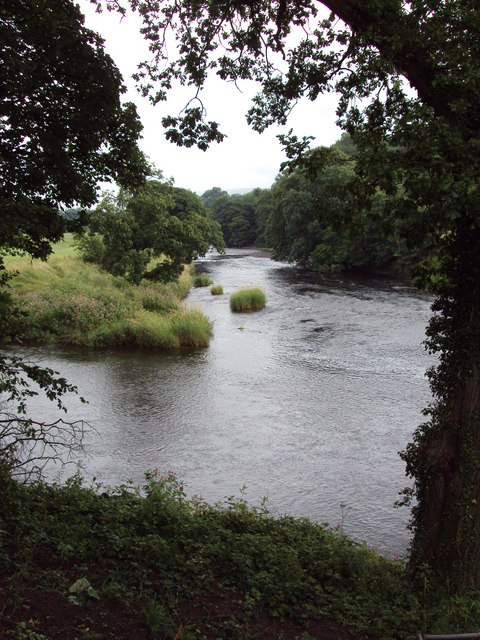
Confluence of the Hodder and Ribble

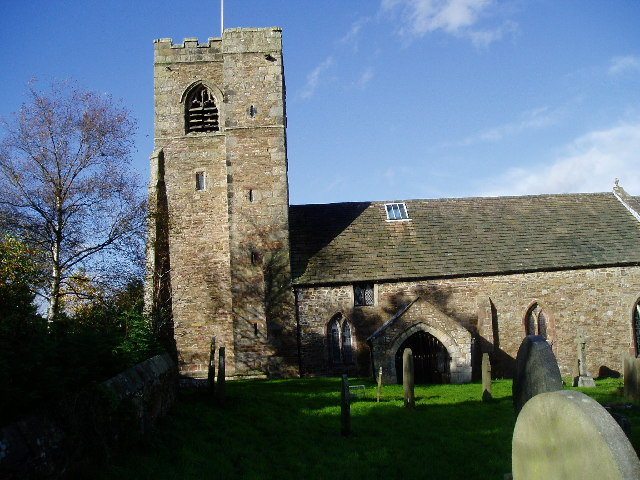
All Hallows Church

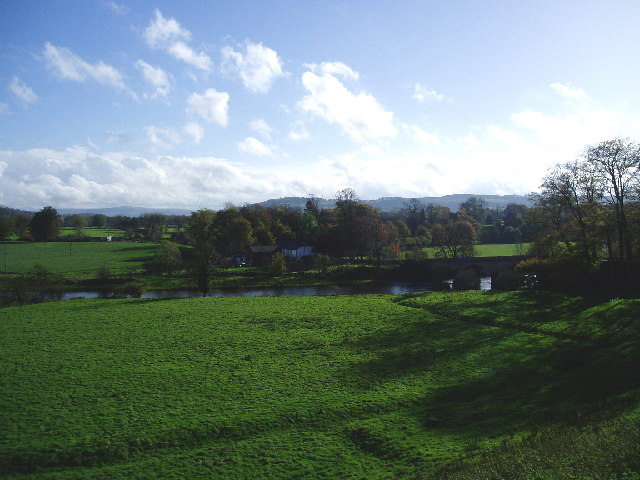
View across the Ribble

== See also ==
- Listed buildings in Great Mitton
