= Bowland-with-Leagram =

Civil parish in Lancashire, England

Coordinates: 53.900°N 2.560°W

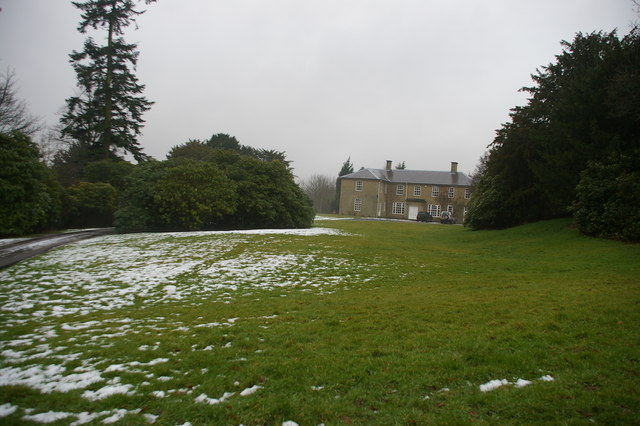
- Leagram Hall

- Location in Ribble Valley Location in the Forest of Bowland Location within Lancashire
- Area: 18.8702 km^{2} (7.2858 sq mi)
- Population: 169 (2011 census)
  - Density: 9/km^{2} (23/sq mi)
- OS grid reference: SD635455
- District: Ribble Valley
- Shire county: Lancashire
- Region: North West
- Country: England
- Sovereign state: United Kingdom
- Post town: PRESTON
- Postcode district: PR3
- Post town: Clitheroe
- Postcode district: BB7
- Dialling code: 01995; 01254
- Police: Lancashire
- Fire: Lancashire
- Ambulance: North West
- UK Parliament: Ribble Valley

Bowland-with-Leagram is a civil parish in the Ribble Valley district of Lancashire, England, covering part of the Forest of Bowland. According to the census, the parish had a population of 181 in 1951, 128 in 2001 and 169 at the Census 2011.

As the only part of the historical Forest of Bowland that lay within the historical bounds of Lancashire, the area was known for many centuries by the name of Little Bowland and this name remains in common use today.

== History ==
Leagram was a hunting park from at least the early twelfth century, being part of the ancient Lordship of Bowland which comprised a Royal Forest and a Liberty of ten manors spanning eight townships and four parishes and covered an area of almost 300 square miles (800 km^{2}) on the historic borders of Lancashire and Yorkshire. The manors within the Liberty were Leagram, Slaidburn (Newton-in-Bowland, West Bradford, Grindleton), Knowlmere, Waddington, Easington, Bashall Eaves, Mitton, Withgill (Crook), Hammerton and Dunnow (Battersby).

As Lady Queen of Bowland, Elizabeth I alienated the park and granted the manor of Leagram to her favourite, the Earl of Leicester, in 1563. It was purchased shortly afterwards by Sir Richard Shireburne of Stonyhurst. Shireburne served as Master Forester of Bowland until 1594. The Shireburnes held the manor until 1754 before it passed to their cousins, the Welds. The Shireburne family tombs are at All Hallows' Church, Great Mitton. John Weld-Blundell is the present-day Lord of the manor of Chipping (Lawn).

Some of the earliest evidence of human settlement in eastern Lancashire has come from this corner of Bowland. In 1946, archaeologists uncovered artefacts, including pottery, indicating Bronze Age occupation at Fairy Holes, a cave situated on New Laund Farm, near Whitewell.

== Governance ==
The civil parish of Bowland-with-Leagram was created from the civil parishes of Little Bowland and Leagram in 1935 (both created from townships in the ancient parish of Whalley in 1866).

== Media gallery ==
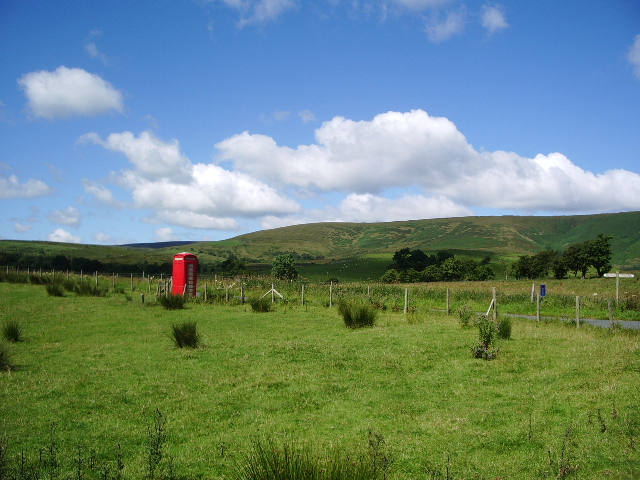
Isolated Phone Box

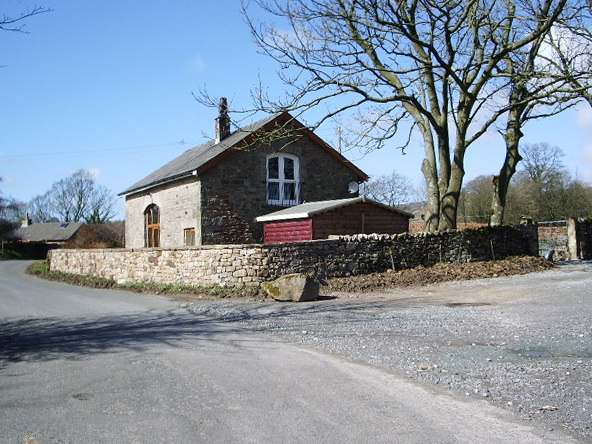
Leagram Mill Barn

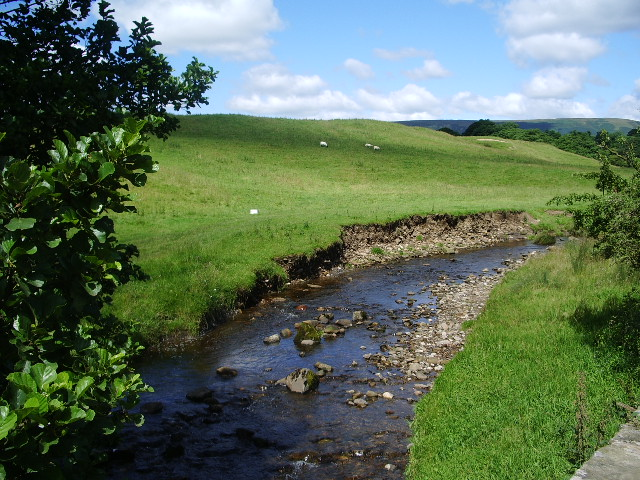
Greystoneley Brook

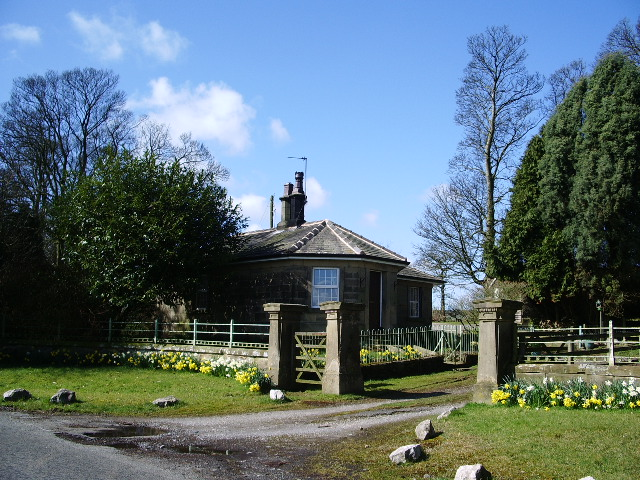
Lodge to Leagram Hall

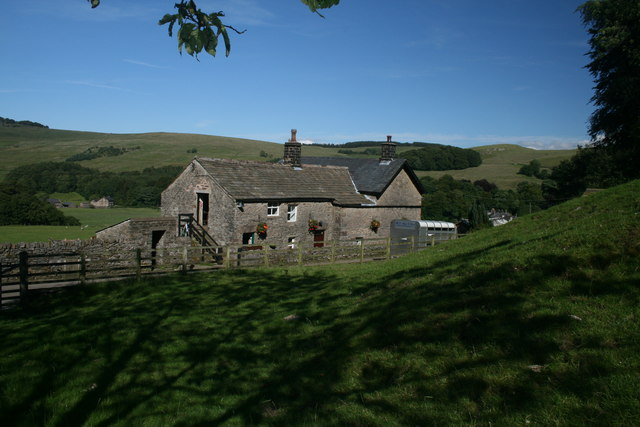
New Laund Farm

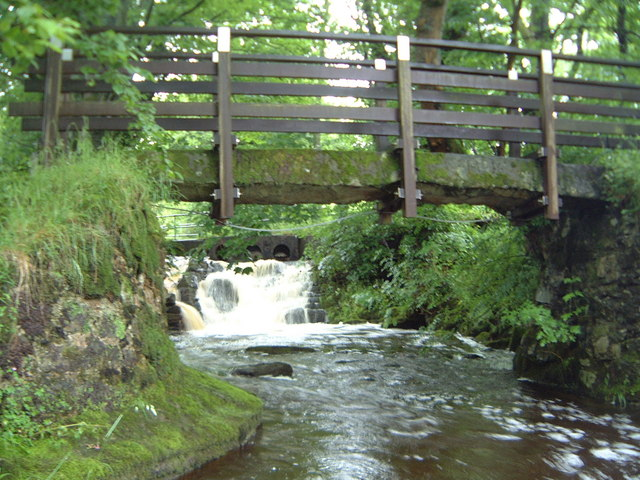
Foot Bridge near Lickhurst Farm

== See also ==
- Listed buildings in Bowland-with-Leagram
