= Listed buildings in Bowland-with-Leagram =

Bowland-with-Leagram is a civil parish in Ribble Valley, Lancashire, England. It contains twelve listed buildings that are recorded in the National Heritage List for England. All of the listed buildings are designated at Grade II, the lowest of the three grades, which is applied to "buildings of national importance and special interest". The parish is entirely rural. All but one of the listed buildings are farmhouses or farm buildings, the other building being a bridge.

== Buildings ==
Name and location	Photograph	Date	Notes
Fair Oak Farmhouse; 53.90963°N 2.53646°W	—	17th century	The house is in pebbledashed stone with a slate roof, and has two storeys and three bays. The windows are of varying types, some are mullioned, some are sashes, and there is a cross window. At the left end is a gabled porch.
Farm building, Fair Oak Farm; 53.91002°N 2.53713°W		17th century	The building is in stone with a slate roof, and has two storeys. It contains doorways with chamfered surrounds and triangular heads, and mullioned windows. In the east gable is an owl hole and an inscribed plaque. To the right are later extensions.
Loud Mytham Farmhouse; 53.88298°N 2.53528°W	—	Late 17th century	The farmhouse was altered in 1879. It is in sandstone with a slate roof and has two storeys with attics and three bays. The windows are mullioned, and the doorway has a chamfered surround.
Farm store, Southern Farm; 53.91700°N 2.54939°W		Late 17th century	The store was converted from a house. It is mainly in sandstone, and has a slate roof, two storeys, and three bays. The windows are mullioned, and the doorway has chamfered jambs and a triangular head. Inside the building is a bressumer.
Barn, Fair Oak Farm; 53.90910°N 2.53730°W		1724	The barn is in limestone with sandstone dressings and a stone-slate roof. In the east face is a wide opening with a moulded segmental head, and above it is an inscribed plaque. Flanking it are doorways with chamfered surrounds. The south gable contains a modern wide entrance, two doors, and an owl hole.
Wardsley Farmhouse; 53.88988°N 2.54066°W	—	Mid-18th century	A house in sandstone with a slate roof, in two storeys and two bays. The windows are mullioned, and the doorways have plain surrounds. In the right gable is a stair window with a semicircular head and a transom.
Higher Lickhurst Farmhouse; 53.90814°N 2.55426°W	—	Late 18th century	A sandstone house with a slate roof and a slate-hung gable. It has two storeys and two bays, and contains three-light mullioned windows. The doorway has Tuscan pilasters, a frieze, and a moulded pediment. At the rear is a stair window with a segmental head.
New Laund Farmhouse; 53.91841°N 2.52669°W		Late 18th century	The farmhouse is in sandstone with a slate roof at the front and a stone-slate roof at the rear. It has two storeys, a three-bay main range, and a rear wing. The windows are mullioned, and the doorway has a plain surround with a false keystone cut in the lintel.
Pale Farmhouse; 53.87269°N 2.56760°W	—	1788	The house is in sandstone with a slate roof, and has two storeys and two bays. The doorway has a plain surround, and the windows are modern. In the right gable wall is a stair window with a plain surround and a round head.
Southern Farmhouse; 53.91733°N 2.54943°W		1822	A sandstone house with a slate roof in two storeys and three bays. The windows and doors have plain surrounds, and the windows are sashes.
Loud Mytham Bridge; 53.88249°N 2.54943°W		1835	The bridge carries a road over the River Loud. It is in sandstone, and consists of a single round arch with solid parapets and rounded copings.
Farm building, Southern Farm; 53.91754°N 2.54968°W	—	Undated	The farm building possibly originated as a house. It is in sandstone with a slate roof, and has two storeys and two bays. The windows are mullioned, and the doorways have plain surrounds.
