= Listed buildings in Easington, Lancashire =

Easington is a civil parish in Ribble Valley, Lancashire, England. It contains nine listed buildings that are recorded in the National Heritage List for England. Of these, one is at Grade II*, the middle grade, and the others are at Grade II, the lowest grade. The parish is entirely rural. The oldest listed building is a medieval cross base, and the most important is Hammerton Hall, a country house. The other listed buildings are all farmhouses or farm buildings.

== Key ==
Grade	Criteria
II*	Particularly important buildings of more than special interest
II	Buildings of national importance and special interest

== Buildings ==
Name and location	Photograph	Date	Notes	Grade
Cross of Greet; 54.04247°N 2.48667°W		Medieval	This is a cross base, consisting of an irregular block of sandstone with a flat top and a rectangular socket. It originally marked the boundary between Lancashire and Yorkshire.	II
Hammerton Hall; 53.97914°N 2.43016°W		c. 1600	A country house in stone with sandstone dressings and a slate roof, in two storeys with attics. It has an E-shaped plan, consisting of a hall, a full-height gabled porch, and cross wings, the east cross wing added in the 19th century. The windows are mullioned, the window in the upper floor of the porch also has transoms, and the attic windows have ogee heads. Both doorways have Tudor arched heads, the outer doorway with a moulded surround, and the inner doorway being chamfered. Inside the house, some of the partitions are timber-framed with wattle and daub panels.	II*
Higher Stony Bank Farmhouse and former granary 53.97988°N 2.39052°W	—	Late 17th century	The building is in rendered stone with sandstone dressings and a stone-slate roof, and has two storeys. The windows are mullioned, or mullioned and transomed, and there is one circular window. The doorway has a moulded surround, and a shaped head and hood. Attached to the left of the house is a farm building with external steps leading to a first floor doorway. At the rear of the house is an outshut.	II
High Halstead; 54.02808°N 2.39450°W	—	1687	A stone house with a slate roof, in two storeys. Some of the windows are sashes, and some have mullions. On the south face is a window, originally a doorway, with moulded jambs and an elaborately shaped and decorated lintel. Above this is a moulded hood and a date plaque. There is a decorated string course, including gadroons and Celtic heads.	II
Stephen Park; 53.99941°N 2.38926°W		1700	A stone house with a slate roof, in two storeys. In the centre is a porch with 1 1/2 storeys. The outer doorway has a moulded surround and a lintel with zigzag decoration, above which is a drip mould and a date plaque. The inner doorway has a chamfered surround and a decorated lintel. Most of the windows are mullioned, some are fixed, and there is a sash window.	II
Barn, Stephen Park; 53.99931°N 2.38953°W	—	1736	The barn is in stone with a stone-slate roof. Its openings include a wide entrance with long-and-short jambs and an arched head, two doors with long-and-short jambs (one blocked), other doors with plain surrounds, and a blocked threshing door.	II
Brook House Green and barn 53.98699°N 2.39920°W	—	1761	The house and barn are in sandstone with a stone-slate roof, and have two storeys. The house has two bays, projecting quoins, and three-light mullioned windows. The central doorway has a plain surround and a mouldedcornice to the lintel. The barn contains a wide entrance with long-and-short jambs, a doorway, a window and, on the upper floor, a pitching hole.	II
Standridge Farmhouse and farm building 53.97620°N 2.40326°W		1763	The building is in sandstone with a stone-slate roof. The house has two storeys and two bays. There is a central doorway with a plain surround. The windows are mullioned, and at the rear is a stair window with transoms. The farm building to the left contains re-used 17th-century material.	II
Black House Farmhouse; 53.99013°N 2.41346°W	—	Early to mid 19th century	A sandstone house with quoins and a stone-slate roof. It has two storeys and three bays. The doorway and windows have plain surrounds, the windows being sashes. Above the door is an illegible date plaque.	II
