= Lordship of Bowland =

Historic barony in Lancashire, England

The Lordship of Bowland is a manorial lordship associated with the Forest of Bowland in Lancashire, England. The lordship fell into disuse between 1885 and 2008, during which time it was widely believed to have lapsed; it was revived in 2008.

In 1885, the estates of the aristocratic Towneley family were broken up following the death of the last male heir. These included the Forest of Bowland. In 1938 the Crown, in the form of the Duchy of Lancaster, acquired 6,000 acres (2,400 ha) of the forest, known as the Whitewell Estate, near Clitheroe; it was generally assumed that the Lordship of Bowland had been transferred to the Crown.

It was subsequently discovered that the sale of Whitewell Estate, while it included mineral, sporting and forestry rights, had specifically excluded the Lordship of Bowland itself. In fact, ownership of the title had descended to an extinct Towneley family trust. Consequently, in 2008, Charles Towneley Strachey, 4th Baron O'Hagan, disposed of the Lordship by private treaty after an auction.

The 46th Lord of Bowland was later revealed to be a Cambridge University don who specialised in the history of Lancashire, its place names and dialects, and had ancestral links to the Forest. The current 47th Lord of Bowland is Brady Brim-DeForest.

== History ==
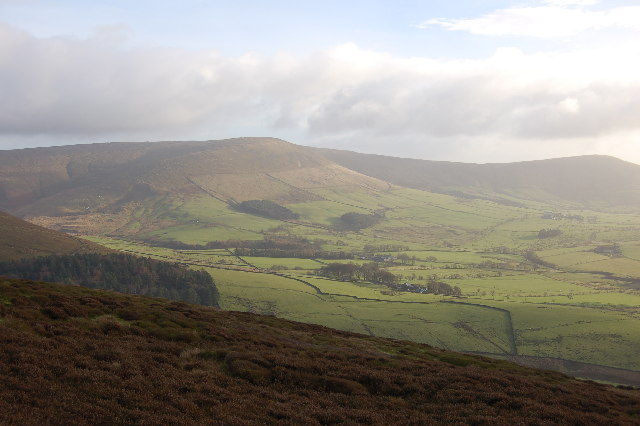
Fair Snape and Parlick fells in northeastern Lancashire

While a lineage for the barony can be traced back speculatively through the Earls of Northumbria to Oswiu and his marriage alliance in 638 AD with the Urien kings of Rheged, the roots of the modern lordship are Norman.

Although Roger de Poitou is recorded as tenant-in-chief of the manors of Bowland in Domesday, what we now understand as the Forest and Liberty of Bowland was created by William Rufus sometime after 1087. It formed part of a larger parcel of lands granted to his vassal, either to reward Roger for his role in the defeat of Dolfin of Carlisle and the army of Scots king Malcolm III in 1091-2 or as a result of the confiscation of lands from Robert de Mowbray, Earl of Northumbria in 1095. These lands came to form the Barony, later the Honor of Lancaster in the 1090s. By the late twelfth century, the disparate holdings within the Honor of Lancaster had cohered to form what became Lancashire, first explicitly recognised as a county in 1194.

In turn, the Forest and Liberty of Bowland, along with the grant of the adjacent fee of Blackburnshire and holdings in Hornby and Amounderness, came to form the basis of what became known as the Honor of Clitheroe. Ownership of the Forest followed the same descent as the Honor, ultimately passing with the rest of the de Lacy lands to the Earldom of Lancaster. After 1351, it was administered as part of the Duchy of Lancaster; from 1399, as a possession of the Crown up until the Restoration. During this period, the lords of Bowland were styled “Lord Kings”. The Forest ceased to be a part of the Honor in 1835.

Territorially, the Lordship of Bowland covered an area of almost 300 square miles (800 km^{2}) on the historic borders of Lancashire and Yorkshire. It comprised a Royal Forest and a Liberty of ten manors spanning eight townships and four parishes. The manors within the Liberty were Slaidburn (Newton-in-Bowland, West Bradford, Grindleton), Knowlmere, Waddington, Easington, Bashall, Mitton, Withgill (Crook), Leagram, Hammerton and Dunnow (Battersby). Harrop was included within the forest.

In 1661, the manors contained within the former Honor of Clitheroe, including the Forest and Liberty of Bowland, were granted by the Crown to General George Monck as part of the creation of the Dukedom of Albemarle. Monck had been a key figure in the restoration of Charles II. The Lordship of Bowland then descended through the Montagu, Buccleuch and Towneley families before passing by private treaty to an unnamed Cambridge professor, who then became the 46th Lord of Bowland. The caput or seat of the barony is Clitheroe Castle.

In 2023 the lordship of Bowland was sold, for an undisclosed sum, to Brady Brim-DeForest of Balvaird Castle the Lord of Balvaird, an American. He assumed the customary title of Lord of the Fells in 2023.
