= Bashall Eaves =

Village and civil parish in the Ribble Valley district of Lancashire, England

Coordinates: 53.885°N 2.463°W

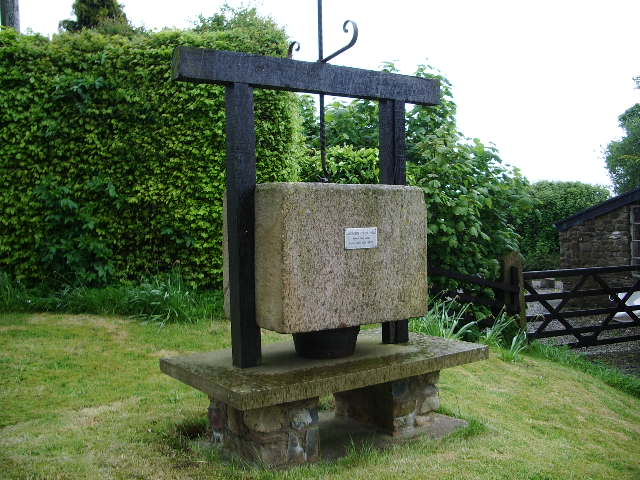
- Lancashire Cheese press in Bashall Eaves

- Location in Ribble Valley Location in the Forest of Bowland Location within Lancashire
- Population: 192 (2011 Census)
- OS grid reference: SD695435
- Civil parish: Bashall Eaves
- District: Ribble Valley
- Shire county: Lancashire
- Region: North West
- Country: England
- Sovereign state: United Kingdom
- Post town: CLITHEROE
- Postcode district: BB7
- Dialling code: 01254/01200
- Police: Lancashire
- Fire: Lancashire
- Ambulance: North West
- UK Parliament: Ribble Valley

Bashall Eaves is a village and civil parish in the Ribble Valley district of Lancashire, England, about four miles (6 km) west of Clitheroe. The placename element eaves is Old English and refers to Bashall's location on the borders of the Forest of Bowland. Historically, the village is part of the West Riding of Yorkshire, but was transferred to Lancashire for administrative purposes on 1 April 1974, under the provisions of the Local Government Act 1972.

According to the 2001 census, the parish of Bashall Eaves had a population of 162, increasing to 192 at the 2011 Census. It covers an area of almost 4000 acres. The village is home an inn, a post office, a telephone box and a selection of farms. Close by Bashall Town farm is Bashall Hall.

Bashall Eaves is predominantly a privately owned country estate historically owned by the Worsley-Taylor family.

== History ==
Historically, Bashall or "Beckshalgh" which means the hill by the brooks, formed part of the ancient Lordship of Bowland which comprised a Royal Forest and a Liberty of ten manors spanning eight townships and four parishes and covered an area of almost 300 square miles (800 km^{2}) on the historic borders of Lancashire and Yorkshire. The manors within the Liberty were Slaidburn (Newton-in-Bowland, West Bradford, Grindleton), Knowlmere, Waddington, Easington, Bashall, Mitton, Withgill (Crook), Leagram, Hammerton and Dunnow (Battersby).

The manor of Bashall was granted by Edmund de Lacy, 6th Lord of Bowland, to Thomas Talbot in 1253. It remained in the Talbot family until the early seventeenth century. The Talbot Arms at Chipping commemorates the family's close association with the town. The Taylor family were lords of the manor from 1806. There is still a fine Georgian manor house close to Bashall Eaves.

In 1934, there was a murder in the village; when detectives investigated the shooting of Jim Dawson, they were met with a "wall of silence" from local residents, and the crime is still unsolved.

== Governance ==
The civil parish was created from the ancient township of Bashall Eaves in 1866. It currently shares a parish council with the neighbouring civil parishes of Great Mitton and Little Mitton.

== Notable residents ==
- Amanda Parker, Lord Lieutenant of Lancashire since 2023

== Media gallery ==
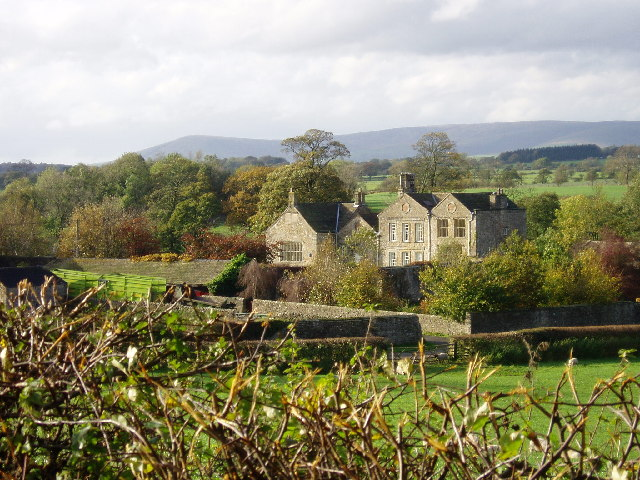
Bashall Hall

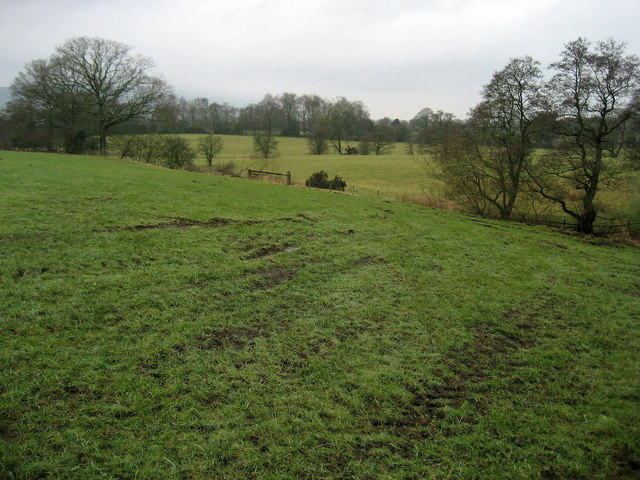
View across the Parish

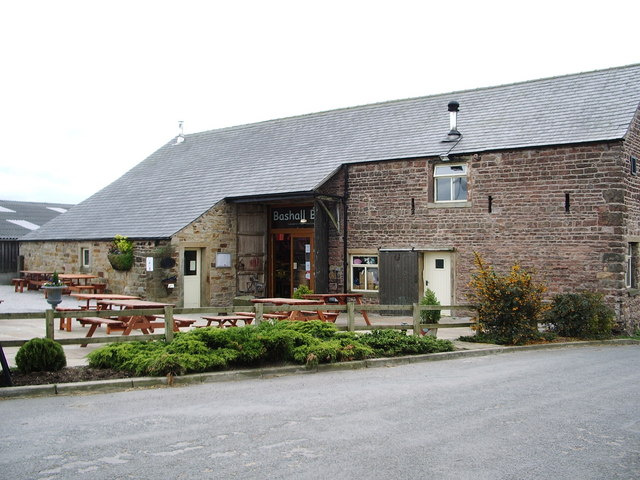
Bashall Barn

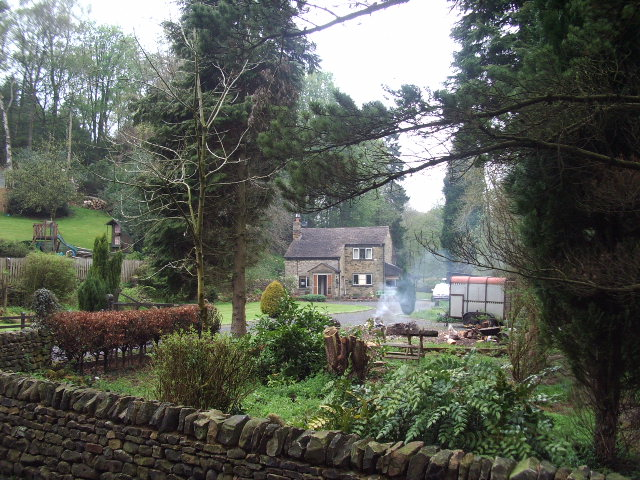
Talbot Bridge Cottage

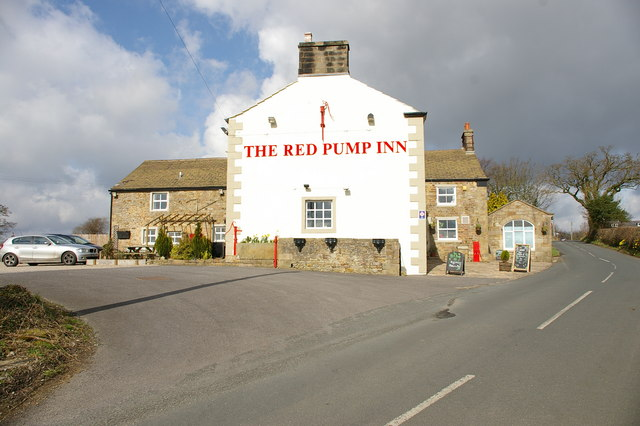
The Red Pump Inn

== See also ==
- Listed buildings in Bashall Eaves
