= Newton-in-Bowland =

Coordinates: 53.947°N 2.461°W

Newton
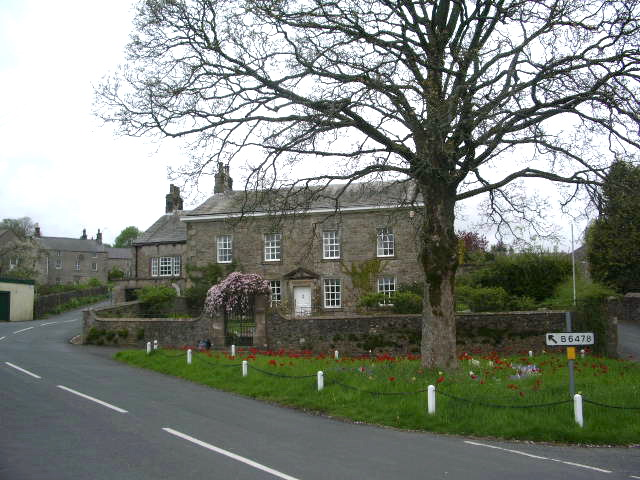
- Newton Hall

- Location in Ribble Valley Borough Location in the Forest of Bowland Location within Lancashire
- Population: 315 (2011 Census)
- OS grid reference: SD697505
- Civil parish: Newton
- District: Ribble Valley
- Shire county: Lancashire
- Region: North West
- Country: England
- Sovereign state: United Kingdom
- Post town: Clitheroe
- Postcode district: BB7
- Dialling code: 01200
- Police: Lancashire
- Fire: Lancashire
- Ambulance: North West
- UK Parliament: Ribble Valley

Newton or Newton-in-Bowland is a village and civil parish in the Ribble Valley district, in the county of Lancashire, England, formerly known as Newton-on-Hodder. The civil parish had a population of 237 in 2001, according to the United Kingdom Census, increasing to 315 at the 2011 Census. The township covers almost 6,000 acres of the Forest of Bowland. Historically, the village is part of the West Riding of Yorkshire, but was transferred to Lancashire for administrative purposes on 1 April 1974, under the provisions of the Local Government Act 1972.

The village pub – The Parkers Arms – takes its name from the neighbouring Parker family of Browsholme Hall. For many generations, the Parkers have served the Lords of Bowland as Bowbearers of the Forest of Bowland. The Parkers Arms is popular with tourists and locals alike. It serves modern British food and local ales and is renowned for sourcing much of its food from within the Bowland area.

== History ==
Recorded in Domesday as Neutone and part of the ancient parish of Slaidburn since Saxon times, Newton has been a constituent part of the demesne of the Manor of Slaidburn since the second half of the fourteenth century. A fall in the population resulting from the Black Death (1348–50) as well as the absorption of Bowland into the Duchy of Lancaster had led to wholesale manorial reorganisation during the 1360s. As a result, the Domesday manors of West Bradford and Grindleton - being part of the parish of Mitton - were also annexed into a new Liberty of Slaidburn, with the caput moving from Grindleton to Slaidburn.

From the late eleventh century, the Manor of Slaidburn had formed part of the ancient Lordship of Bowland. That Lordship in turn comprised a Royal Forest and a Liberty of ten mesne manors spanning eight townships within four ancient parishes and covered an area of almost 300 square miles (800 km^{2}) on the historic borders of Lancashire and Yorkshire. The manors within the Liberty of Bowland were Slaidburn (including Newton, West Bradford and Grindleton), Knowlmere, Waddington, Easington, Bashall, Mitton, Withgill (Crook), Leagram, Hammerton and Dunnow (Battersby).

Two of the mesne manors of the Lords of Bowland remained within the bounds of the township of Newton after the fourteenth century but did not fall within the demesne of Slaidburn: Battersby was held by the eponymous Battersby family until the late sixteenth century. It was acquired and renamed Dunnow by a branch of the Shireburnes of Stonyhurst who held the manor until the time of the English Civil Wars. Much land being sold during this period, the Slinger family acquired the remnant which they held until 1728. Thereafter, the manor passed to Robert Parker, a relative of the Slingers, who sold it to the Wilkinsons in the early 1800s. The current Dunnow Hall dates from the nineteenth century. The last so-called Squire of Dunnow, John King-Wilkinson, died in May 2011.

Knowlmere was a mesne manor of the Lords of Bowland originally subinfeudated to the Savile family but held by the Hammertons from 1382. From at least the mid-thirteenth century, some thirty acres, the core of the estate, had been tenanted by the De Knoll family from which the manor takes its name. The Hammertons suffered severe penalties for Sir Stephen Hammerton's involvement in the Pilgrimage of Grace and their lands, including Knowlmere, were confiscated in 1537. By this time, the manor of Knowlmere comprised "some eighteen farms and lesser holdings which included Birkett, Foulscales, Thorneyholme, Mossthwaite and other properties on the south side of the Hodder between Newton and Dunsop Bridge". A portion of the original Knoll family holding, close to Burholme, appears to have been retained by the family until 1503 when it came into the possession of the Earls of Derby. There has been some speculation that the mysterious Bogeuurde in Domesday - identified by Ekwall with Barge Ford, near Foulscales - may in fact be the manor of Knowlmere in its earliest manifestation.

Title to the Manor and Liberty of Slaidburn, West Bradford and Grindleton, including the township of Newton, was bought by Tory MP, Ralph Assheton, later first Baron Clitheroe, in 1950. In 1977, his second son, the Hon Nicholas Assheton, was granted title. Since 2003, the Lord of the Manor and Liberty of Slaidburn has been Thomas Assheton, son of the Hon Nicholas Assheton and nephew of the second Baron Clitheroe.

Newton was an early centre of Nonconformist religion. Richard Leigh of Birkett, the founder of Newton's first independent chapel in 1696, was closely associated with the great Congregationalist preacher Thomas Jollie. Thomas Jollie's grandson, also Thomas, married Leigh's daughter while his nephew, John Jollie, served as Newton's first Congregationalist minister from 1696 to 1702. The original chapel was replaced in 1887 and was finally closed to services in June 2012. Newton also boasts an historic Quaker burial ground.

== Geography ==
The Roman road known as Watling Street, that runs from Manchester via Ribchester to Carlisle, passes in a NNE direction to the west of the village.

The River Hodder flows through Newton, joined by Easington Brook on the eastern edge of the village, and Foulscales Brook a little further south. The confluence of Foulscales Brook and the Hodder is the location of Barge Ford, considered to be the mysterious Bogeuurde mentioned in Domesday and by some, linked to the early origins of the manor of Knowlmere. Close by sits Foulscales Farm, a fourteenth-century hall, the oldest dwelling in Bowland, tenanted by the Eastwood family, descendants of Richard Eastwood (d. 1871), Bowbearer of the Forest of Bowland and founder of St Hubert's Catholic Chapel, Dunsop Bridge.

== Governance ==
The civil parish of Newton was created from the township of the same name in 1866. In 1938, the geographically non-contiguous division of Lower Easington was transferred to Newton.

Along with Bowland Forest Low, Slaidburn, Bolton-by-Bowland, and Easington, the parish forms the Bowland, Newton and Slaidburn ward of Ribble Valley Borough Council.

== Media gallery ==
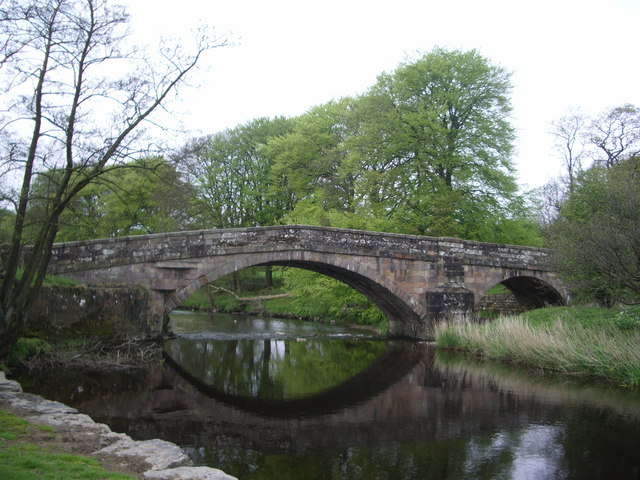
Newton Bridge

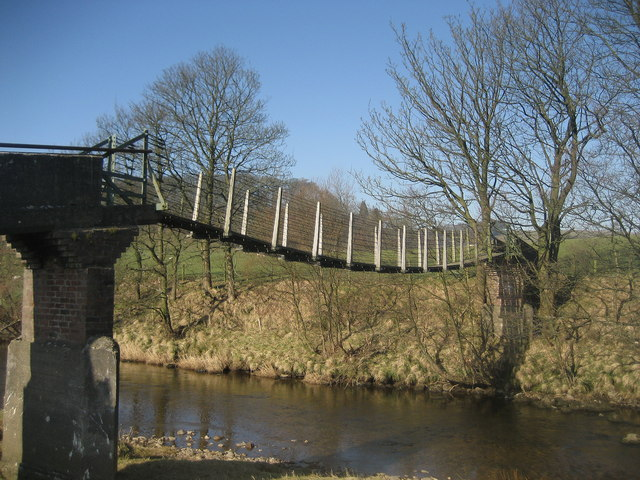
Footbridge over River Hodder

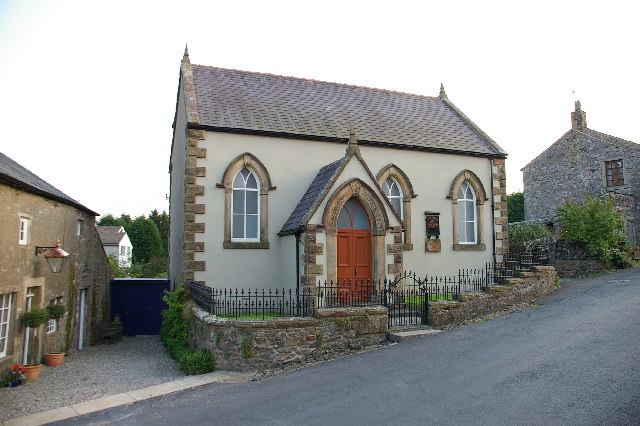
Newton Chapel

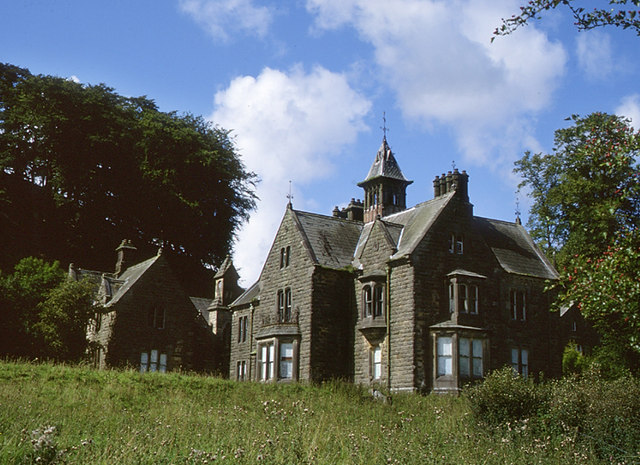
Dunnow Hall

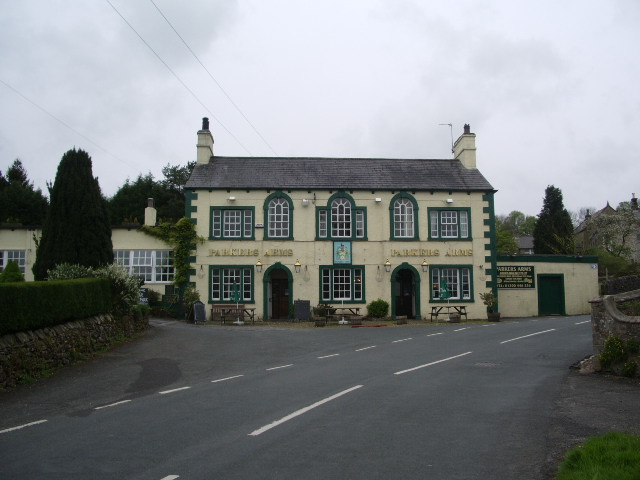
The Parkers Arms

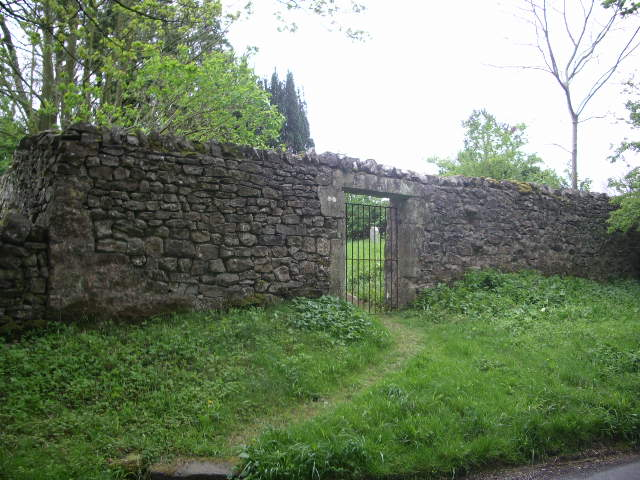
Quaker Burial Ground

== See also ==
- Listed buildings in Newton, Ribble Valley
