= West Bradford, Lancashire =

Village in Lancashire, England

Coordinates: 53.895°N 2.388°W

West Bradford
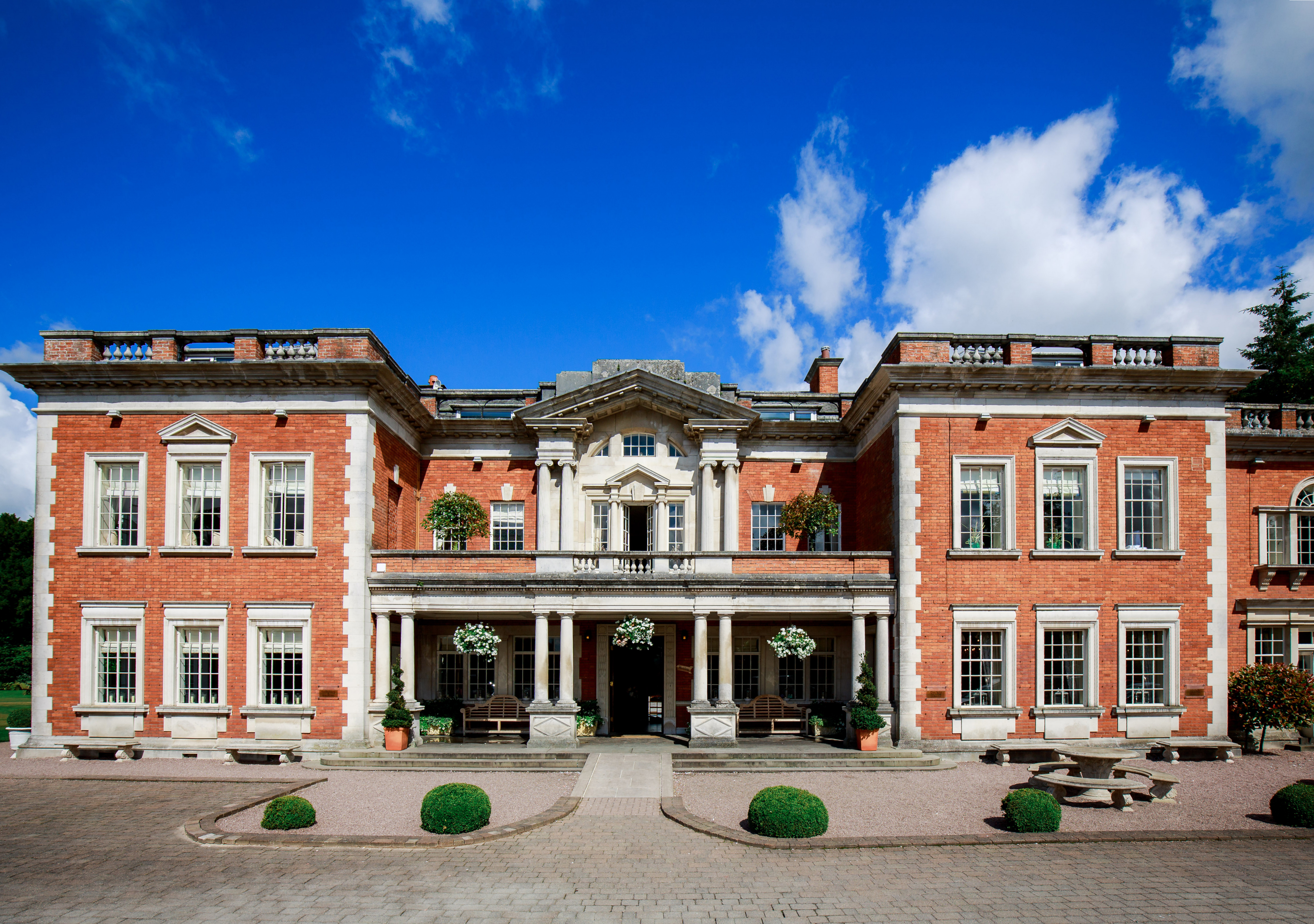
- Eaves Hall

- Location in Ribble Valley Borough Location in the Forest of Bowland Location within Lancashire
- Population: 788 (Parish 2011)
- OS grid reference: SD745445
- Civil parish: West Bradford
- District: Ribble Valley
- Shire county: Lancashire
- Region: North West
- Country: England
- Sovereign state: United Kingdom
- Post town: CLITHEROE
- Postcode district: BB7
- Dialling code: 01200
- Police: Lancashire
- Fire: Lancashire
- Ambulance: North West
- UK Parliament: Ribble Valley

West Bradford is a village and civil parish in Lancashire, England, 2.5 miles (4 km) north of Clitheroe. The population at the 2011 census was 788. It covers some 2000 acres of the Forest of Bowland. In Domesday, it is recorded as Bradeford and in the thirteenth century, Braford in Bouland. It was part of the West Riding of Yorkshire until 1974. "West Bradford" was introduced in the nineteenth century at the start of postal services to distinguish the village from the city of the same name.

Along with Waddington, Grindleton and Sawley the parish forms the Waddington and West Bradford ward of Ribble Valley Borough Council.

== History ==
Since the fourteenth century, West Bradford has formed part of the Liberty of Slaidburn. In turn, Slaidburn was part of the ancient Lordship of Bowland which comprised a Royal Forest and a Liberty of ten manors spanning eight townships and four parishes and covered an area of almost 300 square miles (800 km^{2}) on the historic borders of Lancashire and Yorkshire. The manors within the Liberty were Slaidburn (Newton-in-Bowland, West Bradford, Grindleton), Knowlmere, Waddington, Easington, Bashall Eaves, Mitton, Withgill (Crook), Leagram (Bowland-with-Leagram), Hammerton and Dunnow (Battersby).

Mahatma Gandhi stayed here (Heys Farm Guest House) in 1931 when he came to visit the cotton mills of Lancashire.

== Media gallery ==
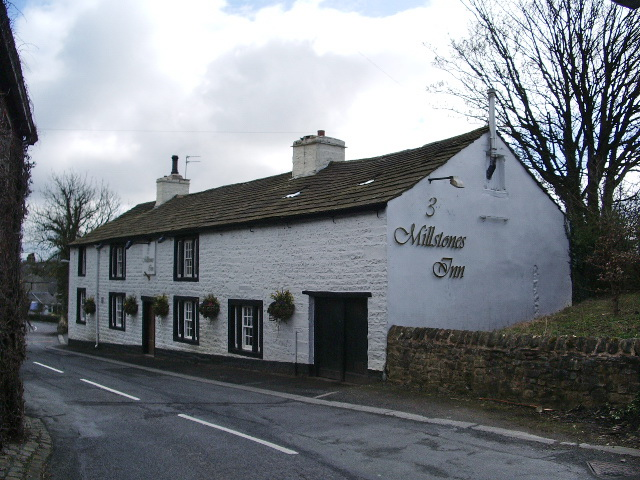
3 Millstones Inn

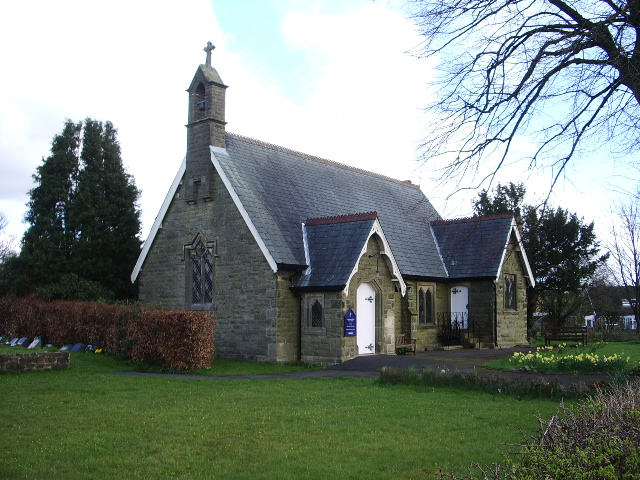
St Catherine's Church

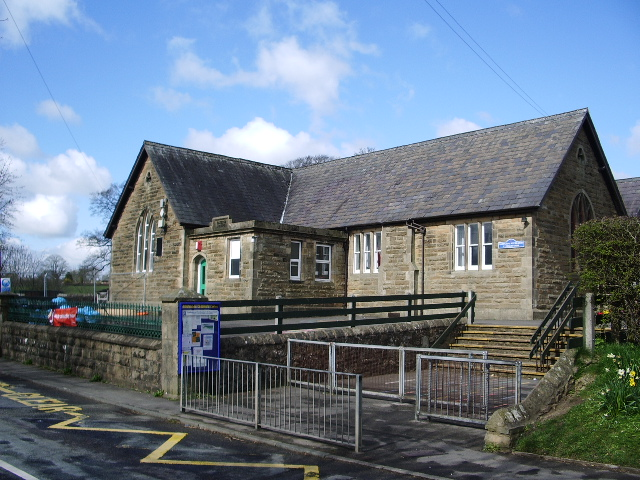
Waddington & West Bradford Primary School

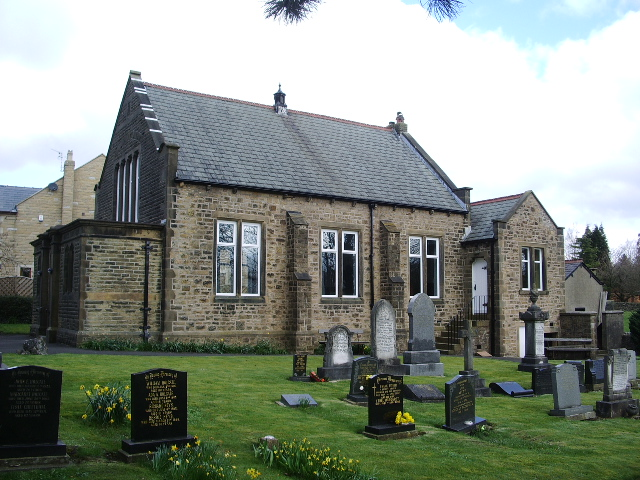
West Bradford Methodist Church

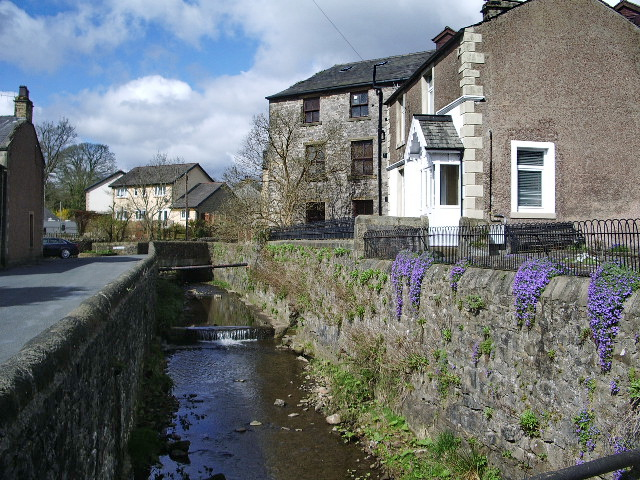
West Bradford Brook

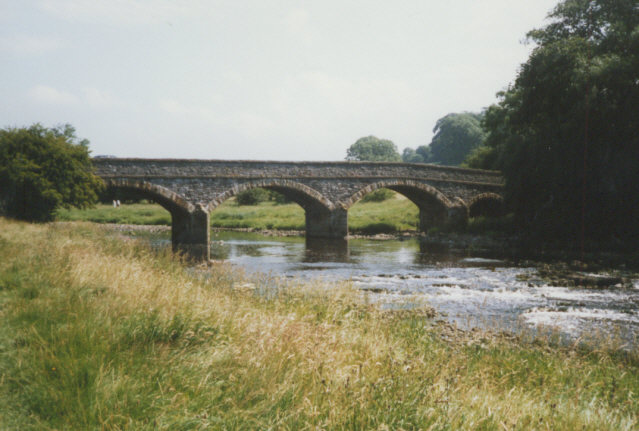
Horrocksford Bridge over the Ribble

== See also ==
- Listed buildings in West Bradford, Lancashire
