= Grindleton =

Village in Lancashire, England

Coordinates: 53.906°N 2.368°W

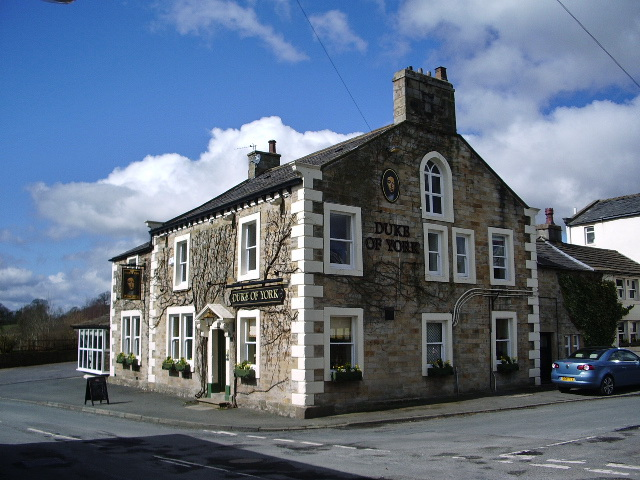
- The Duke of York Pub, at the bottom of Main St

- Location in Ribble Valley Borough Location in the Forest of Bowland Location within Lancashire
- Population: 772 (2011 census)
- OS grid reference: SD758455
- Civil parish: Grindleton
- District: Ribble Valley
- Shire county: Lancashire
- Region: North West
- Country: England
- Sovereign state: United Kingdom
- Post town: CLITHEROE
- Postcode district: BB7
- Dialling code: 01200
- Police: Lancashire
- Fire: Lancashire
- Ambulance: North West
- UK Parliament: Ribble Valley

Grindleton is a village and civil parish in the Ribble Valley district of the English county of Lancashire, traditionally in the West Riding of Yorkshire. Its 3,700 acres sit within the Forest of Bowland. The population of the civil ward taken at the 2011 census was 772.

== History ==
The entry for Craven in the Domesday Book shows that up till 1066 Earl Tostig was lord of Grindleton and the surrounding areas of West Bradford, Waddington, Bashall Eaves, Great Mitton, Hammerton, Slaidburn, Dunnow, Newton, Bogeuurde, Easington, Radholme Laund and Lees. This amounted to 36 carucates (ca5580 acres/1800ha) of ploughland. The Norman Conquest of England added it to the extensive lands of Roger de Poitou.

A caput manor in Domesday, Grindleton was subsumed into the Liberty of Slaidburn in the second half of the fourteenth century. Bowland underwent wholesale manorial reorganisation at that time, perhaps in response to the fall in population caused by the Black Death (1348–50) and the absorption of Bowland into the Duchy of Lancaster.

Both Grindleton and Slaidburn fell under the ancient Lordship of Bowland which comprised a Royal Forest and a Liberty of ten manors spanning eight townships and four parishes and covered an area of almost 300 square miles (780 km^{2}) on the historic borders of Lancashire and Yorkshire. The manors within the Liberty were Slaidburn (Newton-in-Bowland, West Bradford, Grindleton), Knowlmere, Waddington, Easington, Bashall Eaves, Mitton, Withgill (Crook), Leagram, Hammerton and Dunnow (Battersby) . Until 1938, Harrop was an enclave of the Forest before it was subsumed into Grindleton civil parish.

=== Grindletonians ===
The Grindletonians were a small nonconformist Christian dissenting sect founded at Grindleton in the early part of the 17th century. The group's leader was Roger Brearley (or Brierley, Brereley) (1586–1637), a curate who worked at Grindleton, Kildwick and Burnley. The beliefs of the sect are unclear, but seem to have included Antinomianism, anti-clericalism and the concept of an earthly Paradise.

== Notable current & former residents ==
- Richard Holden of the Conservative and Unionist Party, MP for North West Durham Elected 2019.

== Governance ==
The civil parish of Grindleton was created from the township (in the ancient parish of Mitton) with the same name in 1866. In 1938, a geographically non-contiguous area of Bowland Forest Low was transferred to Grindleton.

Along with Waddington, West Bradford and Sawley the parish forms the Waddington and West Bradford ward of Ribble Valley Borough Council.

== Media gallery ==
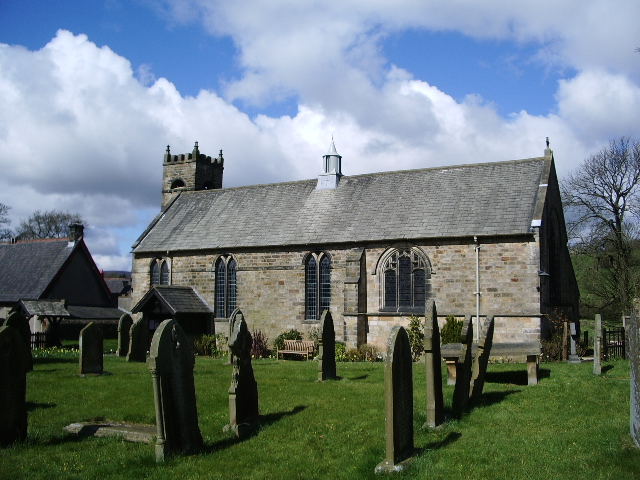
St Ambrose's Church

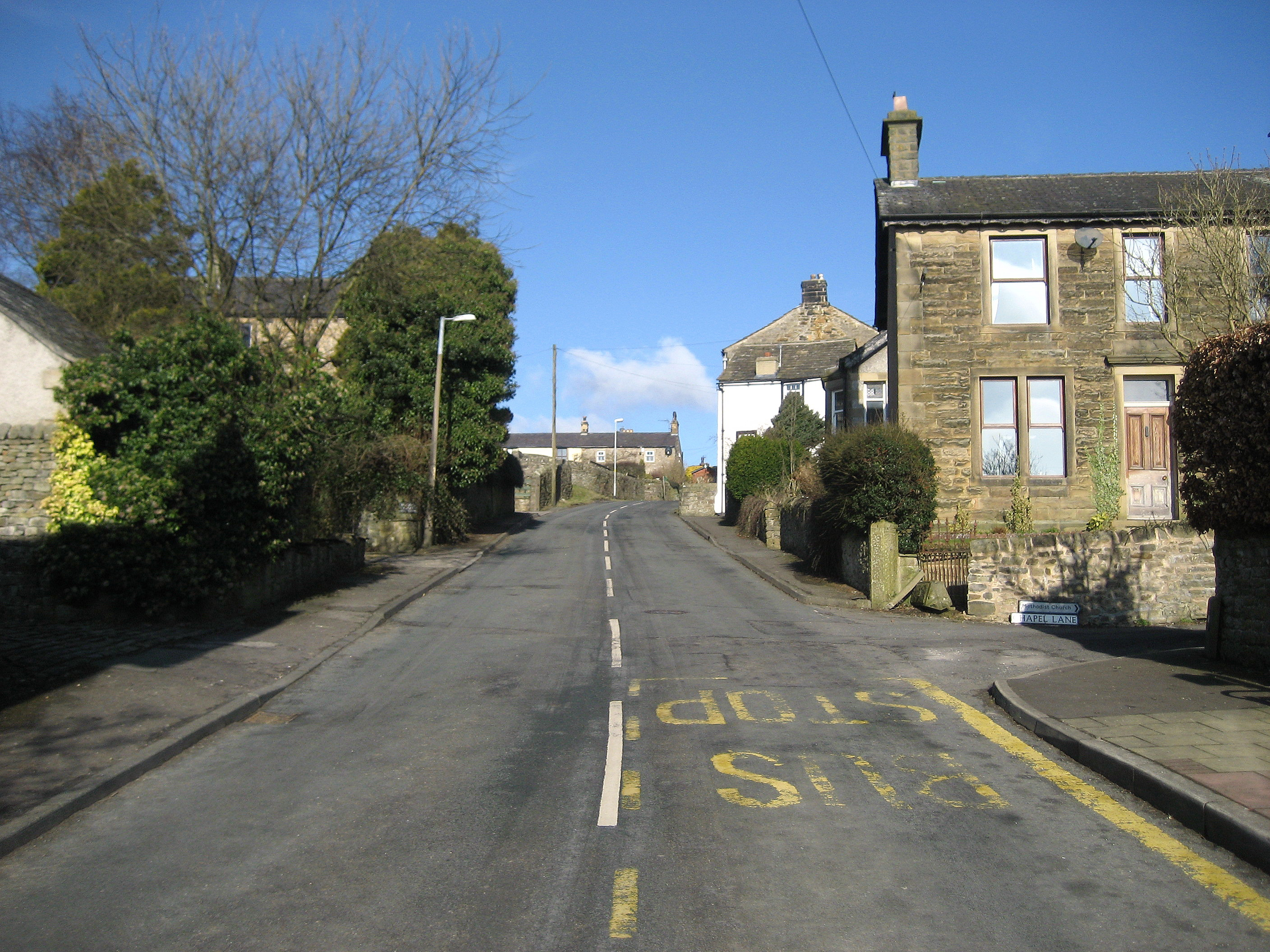
Top of Town

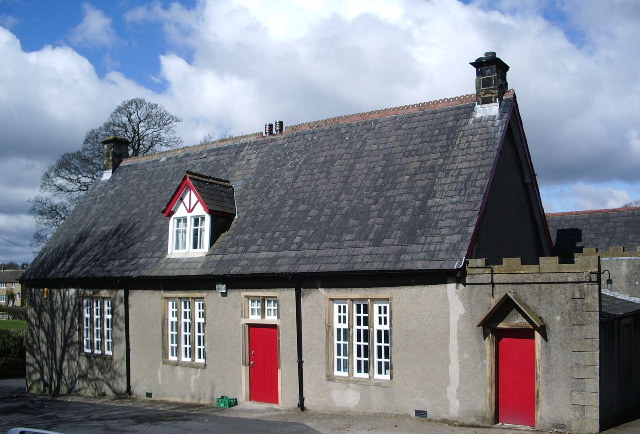
Grindleton Primary School

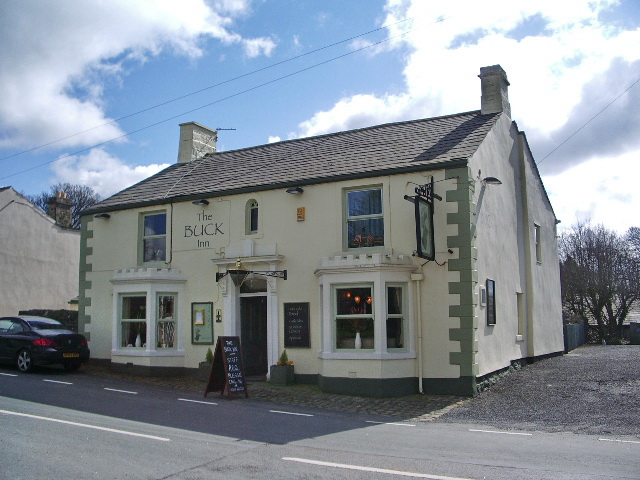
The Buck Inn

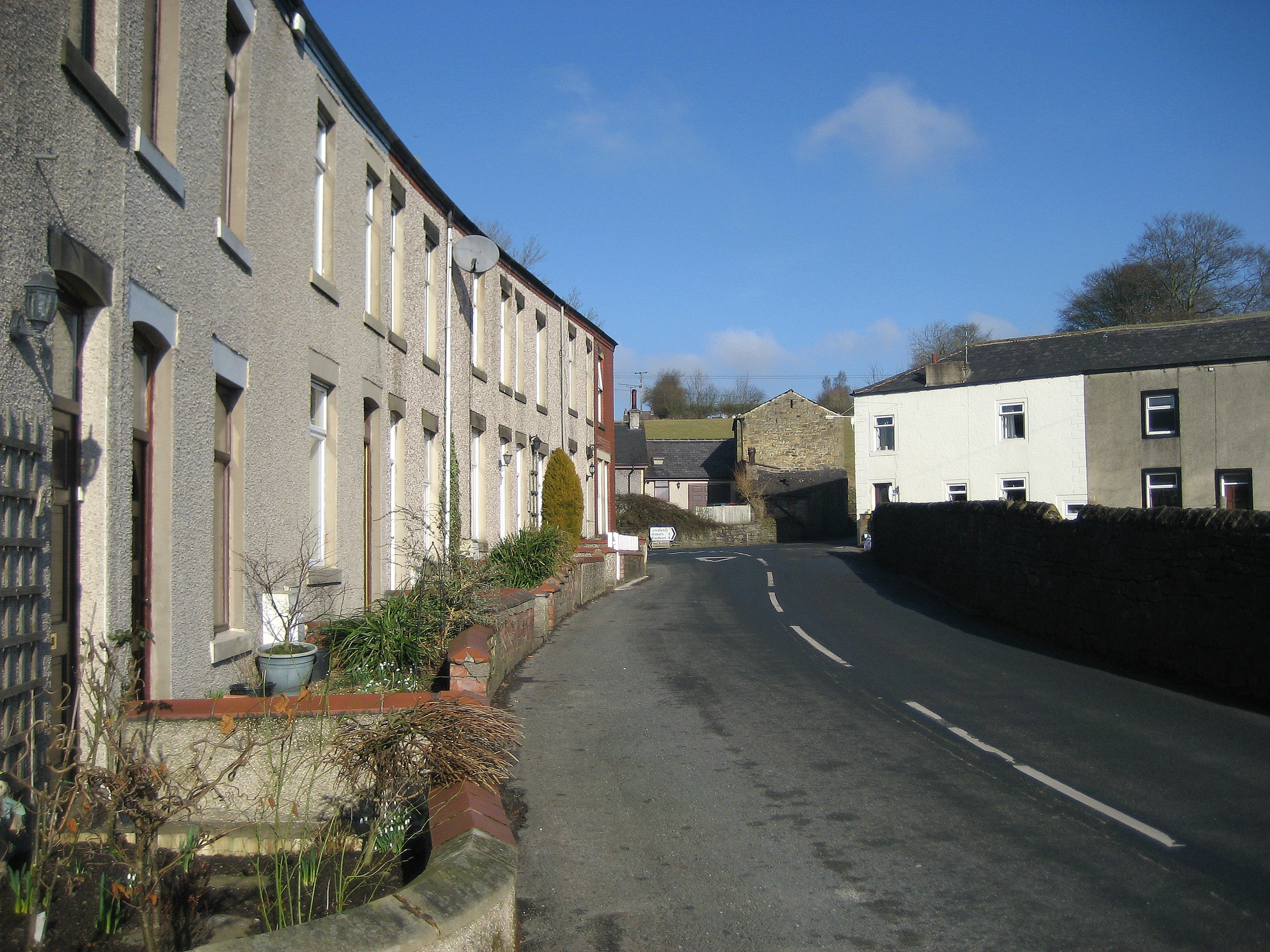
Grindleton Bridge

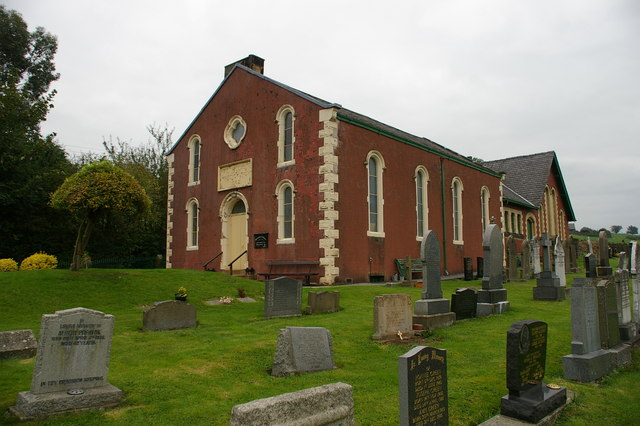
Grindleton Methodist Church

== See also ==
- Listed buildings in Grindleton
