= Mesne =

Mesne (an Anglo-French legal form of the O. Fr. meien, mod. moyen, mean, Med. Lat. medianus, in the middle, cf. English mean), middle or intermediate, an adjective used in several legal phrases.

- A mesne lord is a landlord who has tenants holding under him, while himself holding of a superior lord. Similar ideas are subinfeudation and subcontract.
- Mesne process was such process as intervened between the beginning and end of a suit.
- Mesne profits are profits derived from land while in wrongful possession of it. The rightful owner may make a claim to those profits in damages for trespass, jointly with an action for the recovery of the land or in a separate action. The plaintiff must prove that he has re-entered into possession, that he has title during the relevant period, that the defendant has been in possession during that period, and the amount of the mesne profits. The amount recovered as mesne profits need not be limited to the rental value of the land, but may include sums to cover deterioration, reasonable costs of getting possession and other such items.
- Mesne conveyances are transfers of ownership or possession occurring in intermediate positions in the chain of title between the original owner and the current owner.

== Placenames ==
- Mesnes Park in Newton-le-Willows, Merseyside
- In Gloucestershire, Clifford’s Mesne in Newent
- In Greater Manchester, there are several places with "Mesne" in the name
- Mesne Lea in Walkden, Salford
- Mesnes Park in Wigan
- Worsley Mesnes in Pemberton, Metropolitan Borough of Wigan

== See also ==
- Demesne
- Puisne
- Quia Emptores
