= Easington, Lancashire =

Civil parish in Lancashire, England

Coordinates: 54.000°N 2.403°W

Easington
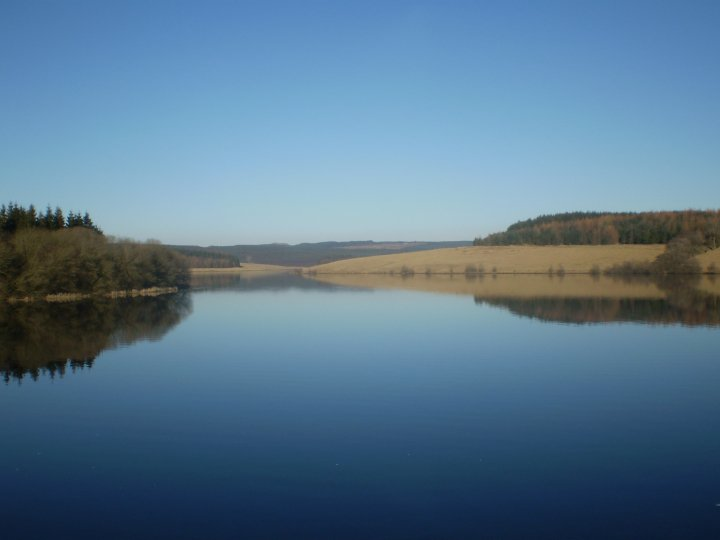
- Stocks Reservoir

- Location in Ribble Valley Borough Location in the Forest of Bowland Location within Lancashire
- Population: 52 (2001 Census)
- OS grid reference: SD739569
- Civil parish: Easington
- District: Ribble Valley
- Shire county: Lancashire
- Region: North West
- Country: England
- Sovereign state: United Kingdom
- Post town: CLITHEROE
- Postcode district: BB7
- Dialling code: 01200
- Police: Lancashire
- Fire: Lancashire
- Ambulance: North West
- UK Parliament: Ribble Valley

Easington (/ˈɛzɪŋtən/) is a civil parish within the Ribble Valley district of Lancashire, England, with a population in 2001 of 52. The Census 2011 population details have been grouped with the parish of Slaidburn. Before 1974, it formed part of Bowland Rural District in the West Riding of Yorkshire. It covers just over 9000 acres.

The parish adjoins the Ribble Valley parishes of Bowland Forest High, Slaidburn, Grindleton, Bolton-by-Bowland and Gisburn Forest along with Tatham in the City of Lancaster district and also Clapham cum Newby, Austwick, Lawkland and Giggleswick in the county of North Yorkshire. (Note: At the north-western end of the parish, at an outcrop known as the Resting Stone, five civil parishes meet, with Giggleswick only touching Easington here.)

== History ==
Near Brown Hills Beck on the eastern border of the parish is a bowl barrow thought to date from the late Neolithic or Bronze Age periods. It is an oval mound of earth, 25 by 15 metres (82 by 49 ft) wide and up to 8 metres (26 ft) high. There is another similar mound on the opposite side of the stream in Gisburn Forest.

Part of the Forest of Bowland, the historic township had two divisions—Lower and Upper Easington—which are geographically non-contiguous. Mystery surrounds the origin of these two divisions.

From Norman times, Lower Easington formed part of the Liberty of Bowland, being a possession of the Lords of Bowland. Its manor was subinfeuded and by the thirteenth century was held by the De Wannervill family. Ownership passed to the Bannister family in the early sixteenth century, with the manor eventually being broken up and sold off piecemeal in the 1690s. The manor sat due south of Slaidburn within the modern-day township of Newton-in-Bowland.

Upper Easington is the larger of the two divisions and includes Dalehead and Stocks Reservoir. It abuts Gisburn Forest and marks the easternmost extent of ancient Bowland. To the north of Upper Easington sits the Cross o'Greet, the ancient boundary point and watershed between the medieval lordships of Bowland and Burton-in-Lonsdale, Clitheroe and Hornby; the route up to the Cross across what was anciently called "Gradale" is perhaps one of the most ruggedly beautiful in the Forest.

It is thought that the lands of Upper Easington may originally have been part of the Slaidburn township but grants by the de Lacys to Kirkstall Abbey in the twelfth and thirteenth centuries gave the area its own distinctive identity. The township of Rushton was granted by Robert de Lacy, 3rd Lord of Bowland, in 1180. This was to be the site of the area's monastic grange (now submerged beneath Stocks Reservoir). In 1220 or thereabouts, John de Lacy, 5th Lord of Bowland, granted an area west of the Hodder and north of Rushton known as "Gamellesarges". In Helen Wallbank's unpublished translation from the Latin, the description of Upper Easington from the grant of 1232–40 reads:

all the land with woods and pasture, without reservation ... on the eastern part of the water of the Hodder in Bowland, just as the water of Hodder descends to the higher head of Gradalehals by the grange of the aforesaid monks as far as the town of Riston, and from the aforesaid head of Gradalehals to the higher head of Kesedene by the boundaries and divisions between my fee and the fee of William de Mowbray, and from the high head of Kesedene to the high head of Rowenumcnothes, and from the high head of Rowenumcnothes as far as the eastern head of Rowenumcnothes, and from the eastern head of Rowenumcnothes, as far as the high head of Hesbrithehawebroc, according to the divisions and bounds between my fee and the fee of William de Percy, and from the high head of Hesbrithehawebroc just as the water of Hesbrithehawebroc descends to the Thirnesetegilebroc, and the Thirnesetegilebroc just as the water of Thirnesetegilebroc descends to the water of the Hodder in the town of Riston.

Gradalehals is the 'grey dale' at the head of Cross o'Greet; Kesedene is Keasden Brook; Rowenumcnothes is Bowland Knotts; Hesbrithehawebroc is Hesberts Hill Brook (now known as Brown Hills Beck and, lower down, Dob Dale Beck); Thirnesetegilebroc is now known as Bottoms Beck, but was formerly known as Bridge House Beck, all these becks being names for the same beck at different locations.

For three centuries, Upper Easington remained Kirkstall Abbey's most westerly land holding before being forfeited by the Abbey in 1539. After the Reformation, Rushton Grange was acquired by the Braddyll family of Whalley and thereafter by the Johnson and Wiglesworth families. The Wiglesworths later built their imposing mansion, Townhead, in Slaidburn. Charles Towneley, then Lord of Bowland, acquired the grange in 1860 before its eventual sale to the Fylde Reservoir Company.

The mesne manor of Hammerton also lay within Upper Easington until the time of the Reformation when the Hammerton family lands were confiscated by the Crown. The manor was later held by the Greenacres and Breres families.

Historians continue to puzzle over the existence of two Easingtons. The Coucher Book of Kirkstall Abbey suggests the lands of the upper Hodder north of Slaidburn were not known as Easington in the thirteenth century, merely as "Bouland". We might speculate that the manor of Lower Easington gained some influence over the area after the Reformation, with the civil administrative map being redrawn to reflect this change, perhaps during the seventeenth century. However, the evidence for this is slight, although a junior branch of the Bannister family was present at Newhouse, south of Catlow, from the early 1600s.

In 2009, a rare limeburners' clamp kiln was excavated at Halsteads in Upper Easington which carbon dating suggests was last fired somewhere between 1205 and 1280. This approximates to the period in the thirteenth century when John de Lacy, 5th Lord of Bowland, gifted his lands to Kirkstall.

There is evidence of prehistoric settlement in Lower Easington: with Skelshaw Ring, a Bronze Age monument, lying due south of Slaidburn.

== Governance ==
The civil parish of Easington was created from the township of the same name in 1866. In 1938, the geographically non-contiguous lower division was transferred to Newton. Easington has shared a parish council with Slaidburn since 1976. The council consists of 7 councillors, with council meetings held 6 times a year at Slaidburn Village Hall.

Along with Bowland Forest Low, Slaidburn, Newton and Bolton-by-Bowland, the parish forms the Bowland, Newton and Slaidburn ward of Ribble Valley Borough Council.

== Geography ==
Easington is located within the Forest of Bowland Area of Outstanding Natural Beauty. Gisburn Forest, the largest woodland in Lancashire, covers much of the east of the parish, extending from the civil parish of the same name. Forming part of the catchment area for the Stocks Reservoir, today the land is largely owned by United Utilities, but since 1949 it has been leased by the Forestry Commission for timber production. Of the 1,196-hectare (2,960-acre) total area (in 2015), only an 8-hectare (20-acre) part called Park Wood, situated on the south side of Bottoms Beck near Stephen Park is classified as ancient semi-natural woodland.

== Media gallery ==
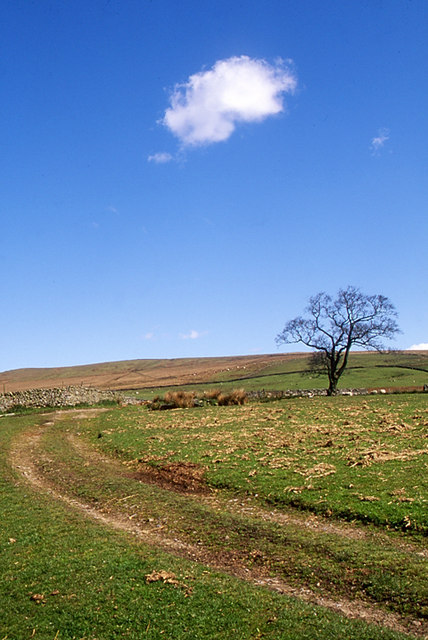
Between Catlow and New House farms

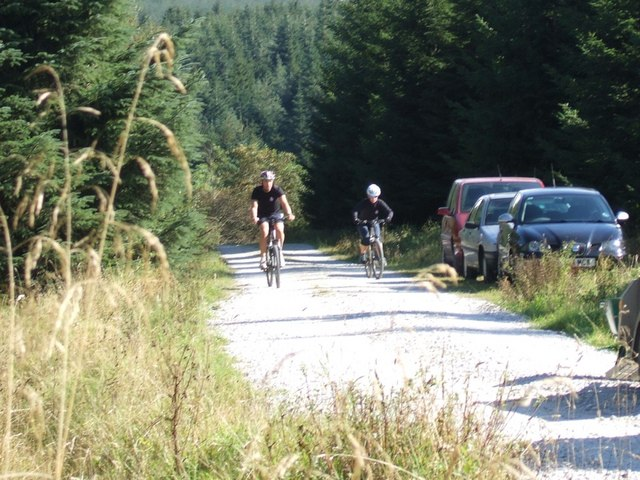
Gisburn Forest

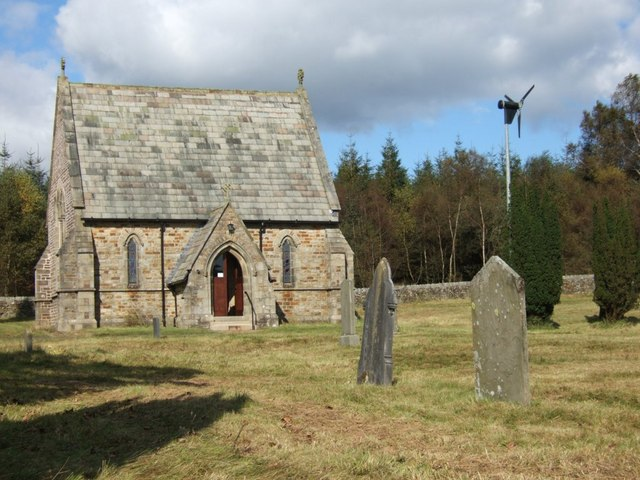
St. James' Church, Dalehead

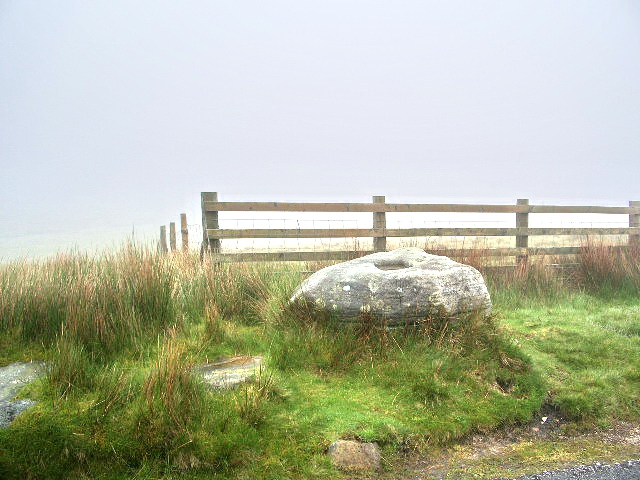
Remains of the Cross o'Greet

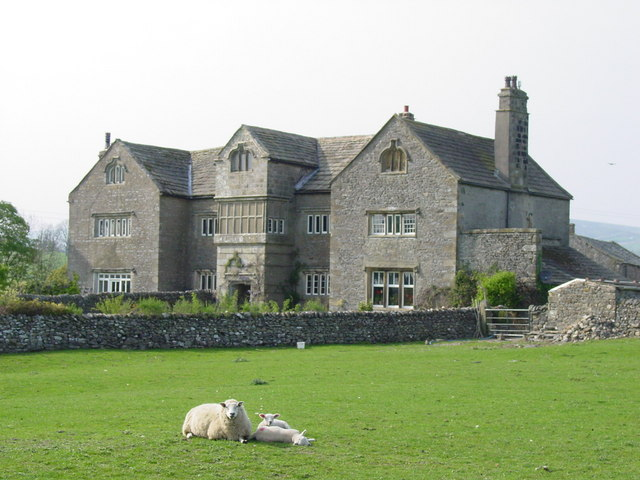
Hammerton Hall

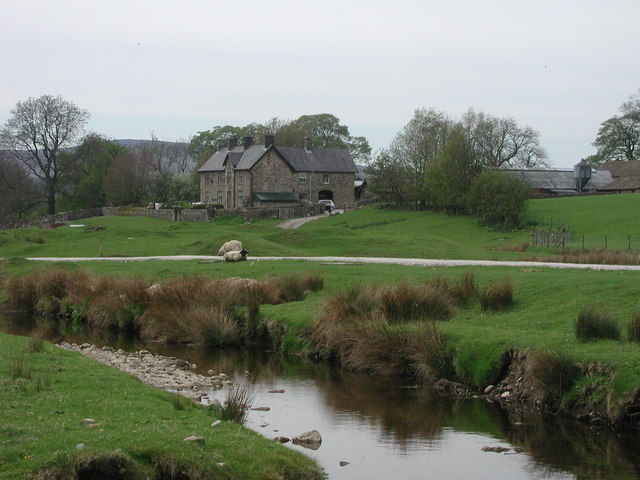
Easington Manor, now in Newton

== See also ==
- Listed buildings in Easington, Lancashire
- Scheduled monuments in Lancashire
