= Gisburn Forest =

Civil parish in Ribble Valley in Lancashire, England

Coordinates: 53.996°N 2.351°W

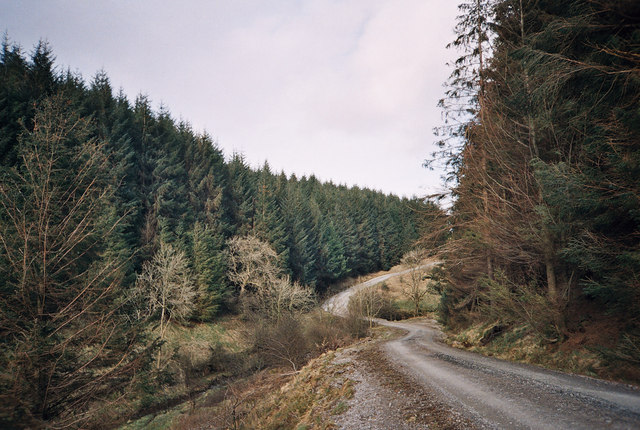
- Gisburn Forest in the parish of Gisburn Forest

- Location in Ribble Valley Borough Location in the Forest of Bowland Location within Lancashire
- Area: 17.9253 km^{2} (6.9210 sq mi)
- Population: 151 (2011 census)
  - Density: 8/km^{2} (21/sq mi)
- OS grid reference: SD770556
- Civil parish: Gisburn Forest
- District: Ribble Valley
- Shire county: Lancashire
- Region: North West
- Country: England
- Sovereign state: United Kingdom
- Post town: SKIPTON
- Postcode district: BD23
- Dialling code: 01729
- Police: Lancashire
- Fire: Lancashire
- Ambulance: North West
- UK Parliament: Ribble Valley

Gisburn Forest is a civil parish in the Ribble Valley, in Lancashire, England. Mainly lying within the Forest of Bowland Area of Outstanding Natural Beauty, the parish includes the larger part of the village of Tosside and the hamlet of Grunsagill to the south. Historically, the parish lay within the West Riding of Yorkshire. It had a population of 151 at the 2011 Census.

The parish adjoins the Ribble Valley parishes of Easington, Bolton-by-Bowland and Paythorne along with Lawkland, Giggleswick, Rathmell, Wigglesworth and Halton West in the county of North Yorkshire. (Note: At the northern end the parish narrows to a point at an outcrop known as the Resting Stone. At this site five civil parishes meet, with Lawkland and Giggleswick only touching Gisburn Forest here.)

== History ==
Near Brown Hills Beck on the western border of the parish is a bowl barrow thought to date from the late Neolithic or Bronze Age periods. It is an oval mound of earth, 40 by 30 metres (131 by 98 ft) and up to 10 metres (33 ft) high. There is another similar mound on the opposite side of the stream in Easington.

The manor of Gisburn Forest was part of the Percy Fee which was listed in the Domesday Book. Matilda de Percy, the widow of William de Beaumont, 3rd Earl of Warwick gave the grazing rights and the right to take timber to Sawley Abbey in 1189. And by 1211, her grandnephew William de Percy, 6th Baron Percy donated the manor. By 1561 the manor was among the former monastic lands owned by Henry Darcy, the son of Sir Arthur Darcy. Around the start of the 19th century the manor was claimed by Thomas Browne, who acquired the largest estate in the township from his relative Mary, the third wife of Sir Robert Burdett. Grunsagill was the centre of this estate.

== Governance ==
The township of Gisburn Forest was part of the ancient parish of Gisburn, itself a part of the Western Division of Staincliffe Wapentake. Gisburn Forest became a civil parish in 1866, becoming part of Bowland Rural District when it was formed in 1894. In 1938 an 175-hectare (432-acre) area in the north-west of the parish was transferred to Rathmell. In 1974 it was transferred from the West Riding of Yorkshire to the Ribble Valley district of Lancashire.

Gisburn Forest shares a parish council with two other parishes, Sawley and Bolton-by-Bowland. Along with Rimington, Middop, Gisburn, Paythorne, Newsholme and Horton, the parish forms the Gisburn, Rimington ward of Ribble Valley Borough Council.

== Forestry ==
The parish shares its name with the largest woodland in Lancashire, which covers much of the north of the parish and extends west to the Stocks Reservoir in Easington, with a total area of 1,196 hectares (2,960 acres) in 2015. Forming part of the catchment area for the reservoir, today the land is largely owned by United Utilities, but since 1949 it has been leased by the Forestry Commission. Only an 8-hectare (20-acre) area called Park Wood is classified as ancient semi-natural woodland, with the rest mainly Sitka spruce, grown for timber production. It is now a location for mountain-biking, walking and horse-riding.

== Media gallery ==
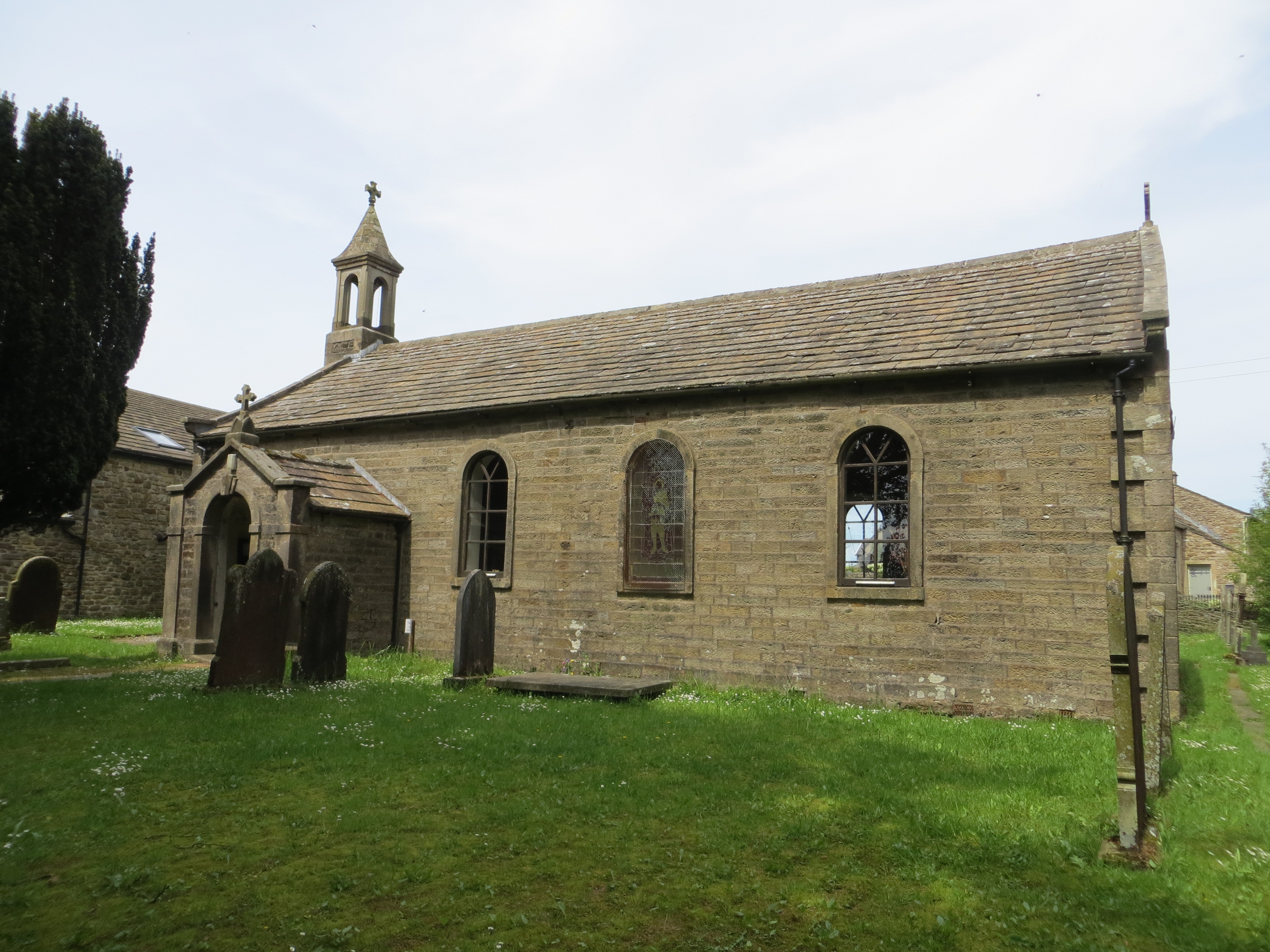
St Bartholomew's Church in Tosside

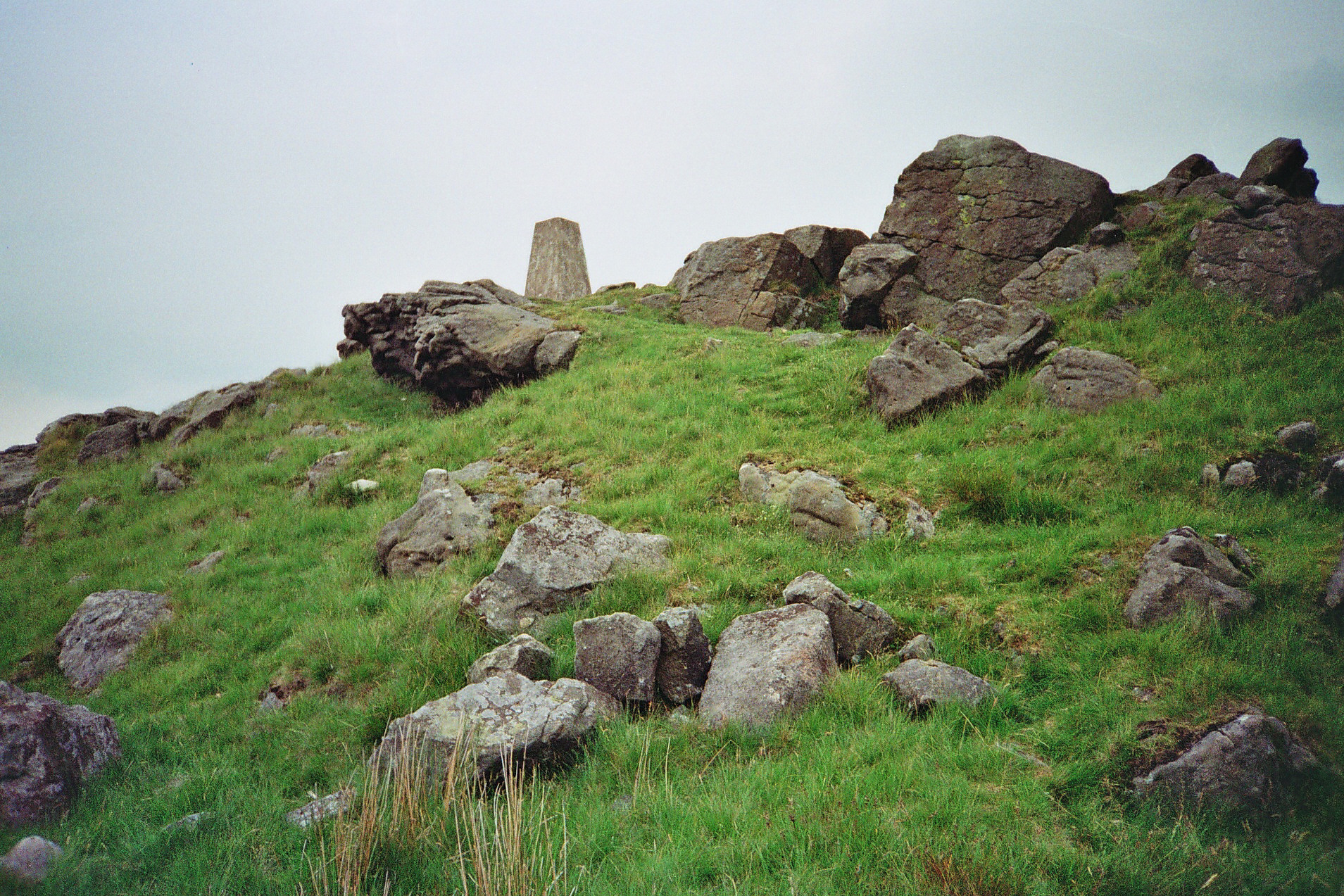
Whelpstone Crag

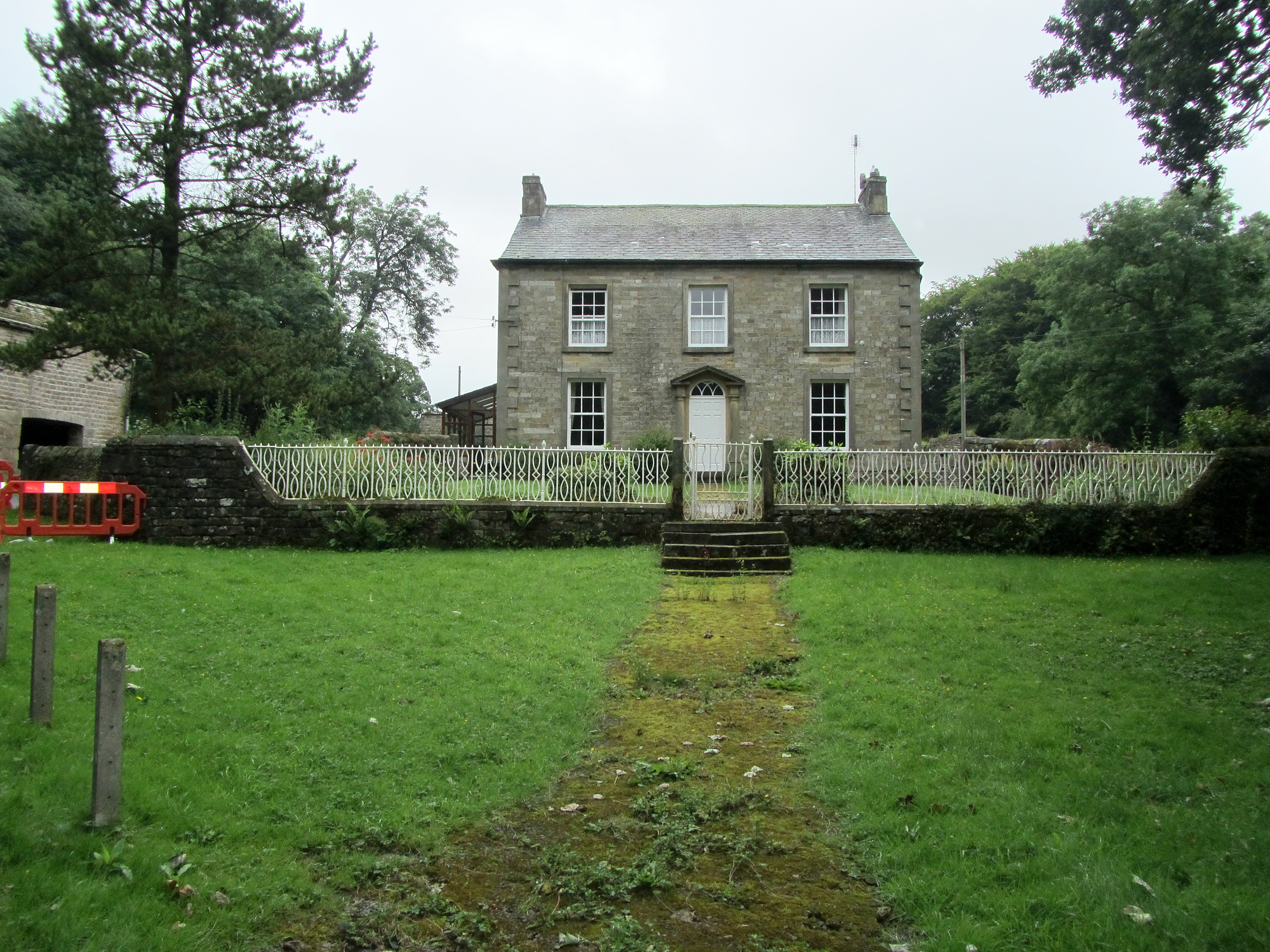
Manor House at Grunsagill

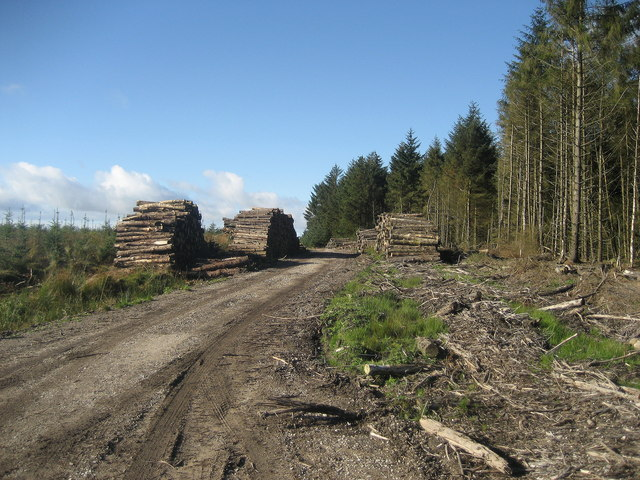
Felled timber on the eastern side of the forest

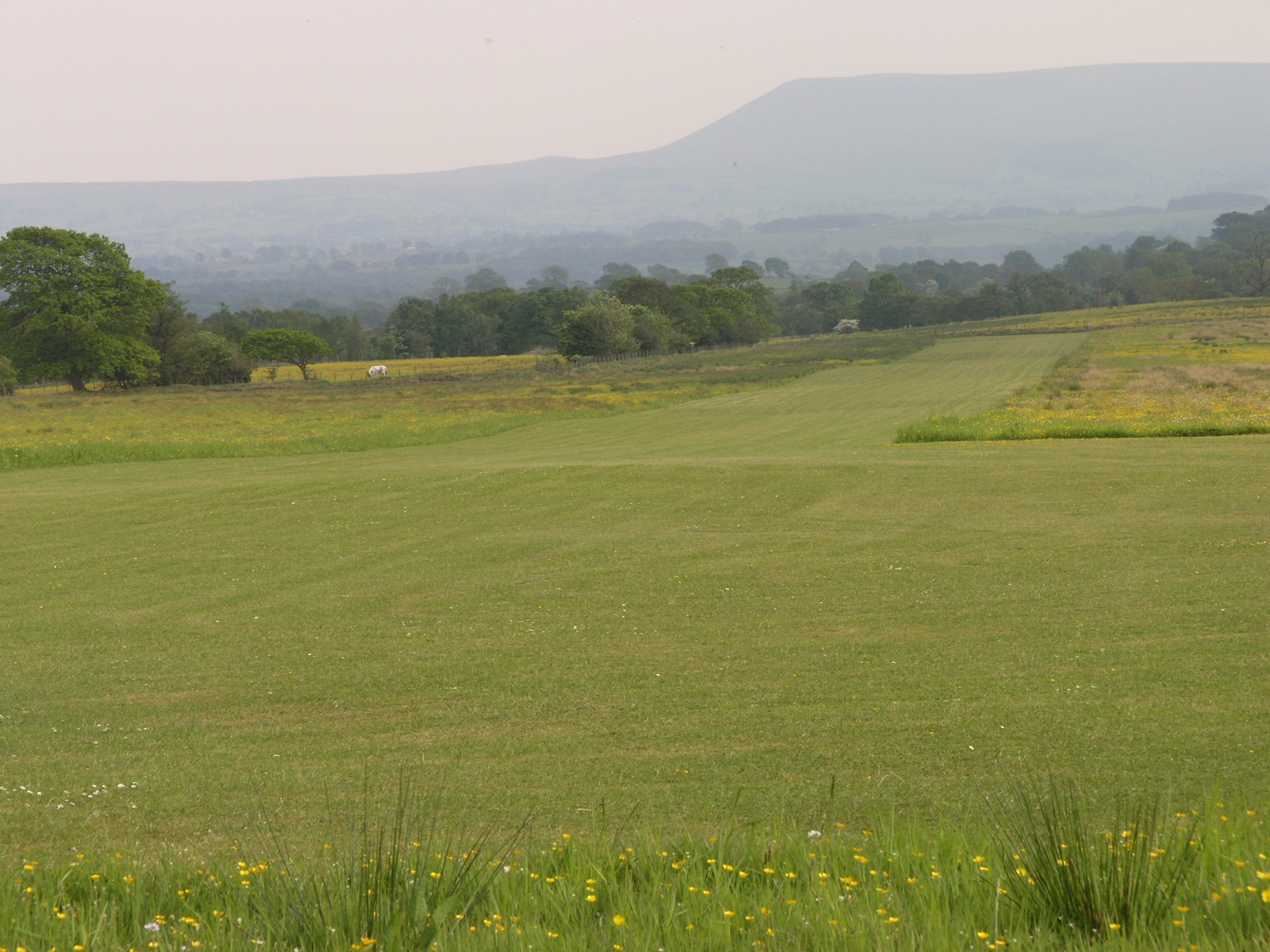
Private airfield near Pendle View Farm

== See also ==
- Listed buildings in Gisburn Forest
- Scheduled monuments in Lancashire
