= Bolton-by-Bowland =

Village in Lancashire, England

Coordinates: 53.941°N 2.329°W

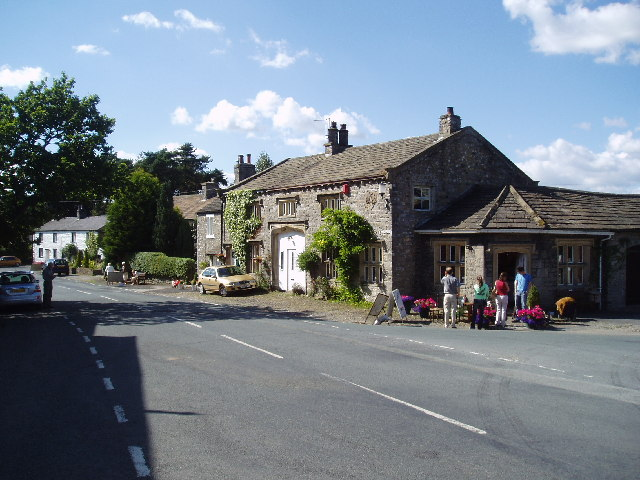

- Location in Ribble Valley Location in the Forest of Bowland Location within Lancashire
- Population: 499 (2011 census)
- OS grid reference: SD785495
- Civil parish: Bolton-by-Bowland
- District: Ribble Valley
- Shire county: Lancashire
- Region: North West
- Country: England
- Sovereign state: United Kingdom
- Post town: CLITHEROE
- Postcode district: BB7
- Dialling code: 01200
- Police: Lancashire
- Fire: Lancashire
- Ambulance: North West
- UK Parliament: Ribble Valley
- Website: www.bolton-by-bowland.com

Bolton-by-Bowland is a village and civil parish in the Ribble Valley district of Lancashire, England. Before 1974, the village was part of Bowland Rural District in the West Riding of Yorkshire. According to the census of 2001, the parish had a population of just 498, rising marginally to 499 at the census of 2011.

== History ==
In medieval times, it was known as Bolton-in-Bowland, reflecting the shifting boundaries of the ancient Forest of Bowland on whose south east flank the village sits. The manor of Bolton-by-Bowland, however, was not included within the Lordship of Bowland, being a part of the Percy family fee from earliest times.

It is thought that there has been a church on the site of St Peter and St Paul's Church since around 1190.

The village is on Skirden Beck, near its confluence with the River Ribble. The village has a car park, toilet facilities and a tourist information centre, is the starting point for many of the area's walks.

== Governance ==
Bolton-by-Bowland was an ancient parish, part of the Western Division of Staincliffe Wapentake. It became a civil parish, probably in the middle of the 19th century, becoming part of Bowland Rural District when it was formed in 1894. In 1938 an 146-hectare (361-acre) area toward the northern end of the parish, that had formed a detached part of Tosside, was transferred to Bolton-by-Bowland. In 1974 the civil parish was transferred from the West Riding of Yorkshire to the Ribble Valley district of Lancashire.

Bolton-by-Bowland shares a parish council with two other parishes, Sawley and Gisburn Forest. Along with Bowland Forest Low, Slaidburn, Newton-in-Bowland, and Easington, the parish forms the Bowland, Newton and Slaidburn ward of Ribble Valley Borough Council.

== See also ==
- Listed buildings in Bolton-by-Bowland
- Staincliffe Wapentake
