= Listed buildings in Bolton-by-Bowland =

Bolton-by-Bowland is a civil parish in Ribble Valley, Lancashire, England. It contains 44 listed buildings that are recorded in the National Heritage List for England. Of these, one is listed at Grade I, the highest of the three grades; three are at Grade II*, the middle grade; and the others are at Grade II, the lowest grade. The parish contains the village of Bolton-by-Bowland and the settlement of Holden, and surrounding countryside. Most of the listed buildings are houses and associated structure, farmhouses, and farm buildings. Also listed are crosses, cross bases, churches and associated structures, bridges, a wellhouse, a school, a public house, and stocks.

== Key ==
Grade	Criteria
I	Buildings of exceptional interest, sometimes considered to be internationally important
II*	Particularly important buildings of more than special interest
II	Buildings of national importance and special interest

== Buildings ==
Name and location	Photograph	Date	Notes	Grade
Bolton Peel Cross; 53.93342°N 2.34144°W		Medieval (probable)	The base is probably medieval, the rest of the cross dating from the early 20th century. It is in sandstone, and the base is partly buried; it has a square platform and a rectangular socket. The shaft is chamfered and carries a pierced foliated cross.	II
Cross base, Bolton Hall; 53.93373°N 2.32867°W		Medieval (probable)	The base is in sandstone. It consists of a large rough block of stone on which is a dressed square block with chamfered edges. This has a socket for a cross shaft, and a stump of this has survived.	II
Cross base, Bolton Mill; 53.93561°N 2.33414°W		Medieval (probable)	The cross base is in an isolated position in a field. It is in sandstone, square and roughly dressed, and has a square socket on the top.	II
Stump Cross; 53.95407°N 2.30371°W	—	Medieval (probable)	The base is probably medieval, the rest of the cross dating from the late 19th century. It is in sandstone, and has a roughly square base with a socket holding a cross with chamfered edges.	II
Village Cross; 53.94032°N 2.32831°W		Medieval (probable)	The cross stands on the village green. It is in sandstone, and consists of a rectangular shaft with its top missing, on a socketed square base standing on four square steps.	II
St Peter and St Paul's Church; 53.94020°N 2.32679°W		15th century	The church was restored and extended in 1885–86 by Paley and Austin. It is in sandstone with roofs of stone-slate and lead. The church consists of a nave and chancel with a clerestory, aisles, a southeast chapel, a south porch, and a west tower. The tower has diagonal buttresses, and an embattled parapet with corner pinnacles and gargoyles.	I
Barn, Bolton Peel Farm; 53.93383°N 2.34159°W	—	17th century (or earlier)	Originally a cruck-framed barn, most of the present fabric dates possibly from the early 19th century. The walls are of sandstone and the roof is asbestos. The barn contains a wide entrance, shippon doors, and a threshing door. Inside are parts of three cruck trusses.	II
Barn, Howgills House; 53.94071°N 2.33331°W	—	17th century (or earlier)	The barn has been converted into a house; most of the fabric dates possibly from the 18th century. The building is cruck-framed, with sandstone walls and a roof of cedar shingles, and is in one storey. It has a wide entrance, above which is a gable, and modern windows. Inside are two cruck trusses.	II
Bolton Peel Farmhouse; 53.93357°N 2.34168°W		17th century	The house is in sandstone with a stone-slate roof, in two storeys and three bays. The windows are mullioned. On the front is a two-storey gabled porch; the outer and inner doorways have moulded surrounds and Tudor arched heads. At the rear is a stair outshut and a parallel range.	II*
Fox Ghyll; 53.94484°N 2.32356°W	—	17th century	A sandstone house with a slate roof, in two storeys and five bays, with 20th-century extensions at the rear. The windows are mullioned, and on the front is a gabled porch with a sundial plate dated 1912. The doorway has a chamfered surround and a Tudor arched head.	II
9 and 11 Main Street; 53.94013°N 2.32964°W		Late 17th century	A pair of stone houses with a blue slate roof in two storeys. No. 11 has two mullioned windows, the others being modern. The doorway has a chamfered surround and a Tudor arched head. No. 9 to the left has two bays, a central doorway with a plain surround, and modern windows.	II
Fooden Farmhouse; 53.93673°N 2.30657°W	—	Late 17th century	A stone house with a stone-slate roof in two storeys and two bays. It has a gabled single-storey porch with a pigeon hole in the gable. The inner and outer doorways have plain surrounds, and the windows are mullioned. To the left is a taller bay with modern windows dating probably from the 19th century.	II
Fooden Hall; 53.93631°N 2.30608°W		Late 17th century	The house is in sandstone with a stone-slate roof. It is in two storeys and two bays with an outshut at the rear. The windows in the ground floor are mullioned, and in the upper floor they are mullioned and transomed. On the front is a two-storey gabled porch. The outer doorway has a moulded surround, a segmental arched head, and moulded imposts, and the inner doorway has a Tudor arched head.	II*
Hungrill Farmhouse; 53.94902°N 2.34360°W	—	Late 17th century	The farmhouse was later reduced in size, then extended in the 19th century. It is in sandstone with a stone-slate roof, and in three storeys. On the front is a single-storey gabled porch with a doorway in the left return. The windows are mullioned.	II
Wycongill Farmhouse; 53.94967°N 2.34818°W	—	Late 17th century	A stone house with sandstone dressings and a stone-slate roof in two storeys. It has a two-storey porch, and a doorway with a moulded surround and a Tudor arched head. The windows are mullioned.	II
Beckfoot Farmhouse and farm building 53.97862°N 2.34534°W	—	1686	The building was partly rebuilt in 1876. It is in sandstone with a slate roof, and contains mullioned windows. The house has a two-storey gabled porch with two bays to the right. The porch has a doorway with a moulded surround and a shaped lintel. Over the doorway is an inscribed plaque, and there is another inscribed plaque in the gable above. To the left of the porch is a shippon and garage, formerly part of the house, with an asbestos sheet roof.	II
Broxup House and Cottage; 53.94097°N 2.34585°W	—	1687	The house and cottage are in stone with a slate roof and are in two storeys. The windows in the ground floor of the house are mullioned. In the upper floor are two five-light windows, the lower central light having a semicircular head, and to the left is a vesica-shaped window. Below this is a doorway that has a chamfered surround and a shaped decorated lintel inscribed with the date. The cottage to the left has two bays, a doorway with a plain surround, sash windows at the front, and mullioned windows at the rear.	II
Higher Heights Farmhouse and farm buildings 53.93396°N 2.36100°W	—	c. 1700	The house and farm buildings are in pebbledashed stone with sandstone dressings and a stone-slate roof. The house has two storeys, a central two-storey gabled porch, mullioned windows, and a doorway with an architrave. To the left is a former stable with two wide entrances, a door and a pitching hole. To the right of the house is a barn and a shippon with a sash window, a wide entrance, a door, and pitching holes.	II
Stoop Lane Farmhouse; 53.95175°N 2.33111°W		1703	The house is in rendered stone with a stone-slate roof, and has two storeys. It is in a T-shaped plan with a central two-storey gabled porch that is flanked by one bay on each side. The porch has a doorway and cornice, both moulded. Above the doorway is an inscribed plaque, over which is a five-light window, the central lowest light having a semicircular head. The other windows are mullioned.	II
Alder House; 53.94965°N 2.35831°W	—	1708	A sandstone house with a stone-slate roof in three storeys. It has a three-storey gabled porch, the upper storeys being jettied. The windows on the front of the house are mullioned and transomed, or mullioned with stepped heads. The outer doorway has a chamfered surround and a shaped lintel, above which is a date plaque. The inner doorway has a moulded surround and a Tudor arched head. The windows at the rear are mullioned.	II*
Primrose Cottage and No. 6 Main Street; 53.93981°N 2.32991°W		1716	Originally one house, later divided into two, it is in stone with a stone-slate roof and has two storeys. The windows are mullioned. The doorway of Primrose Cottage has moulded jambs, and an elaborately shaped and decorated lintel inscribed with initials and the date. The doorway of No. 6 has a plain surround.	II
Fernside; 53.94060°N 2.32781°W		Early 18th century	A stone house with a stone-slate roof in two storeys and two bays. The windows are mullioned, to the right is a doorway, and there is also a former doorway partly blocked to form a window.	II
13 and 15 Hellifield Road; 53.94092°N 2.32659°W		Mid-18th century	A pair of sandstone houses with a stone-slate roof, in two storeys and three bays. The original windows are mullioned, and there is one sash window and one modern window. The doorways have architraves.	II
14 Main Street; 53.93996°N 2.32924°W		Late 18th century (probable)	Originally two dwellings, later converted into one house, it is in stone with a slate roof. There are two storeys and two bays. The windows are modern, and one of the doorways has been altered to a window.	II
Church Gates; 53.94006°N 2.32721°W		Late 18th century (probable)	A sandstone house with a slate roof in two storeys and five bays. The ground floor windows are mullioned. In the centre is a single-storey gabled porch that has an outer doorway with a chamfered surround and a Tudor arched head. The inner doorway has Tuscan pilasters and a semicircular fanlight. At the rear are sash windows with a central mullion, and a stair window with a semicircular head.	II
Coach and Horses Public House; 53.93995°N 2.32854°W		Late 18th century	A public house in limestone with quoins and a hipped slate roof in two storeys. The main part is symmetrical with three bays, and there is a set-back bay to the right. The windows are sashes, and the doorway has a plain surround, a semicircular head, and a fanlight.	II
Sundial base 53.93996°N 2.32700°W		Late 18th century	The sundial base is in the southwest corner of the churchyard of St Peter and St Paul's Church. It is in sandstone and consists of a fluted pillar in the form of a baluster with a square base, and has a moulded bell capital. The plate and the gnomon are missing.	II
Greaves; 53.95442°N 2.36004°W	—	c. 1800	A pair of sandstone houses with a stone-slate roof in two storeys and three bays. The doors and windows have plain surrounds, and the windows are mullioned.	II
Forest Becks Bridge; 53.95708°N 2.32805°W		c. 1800	The bridge carries Forest Becks Brow over Skirden Beck. It is in sandstone, and consists of a single segmental arch with terminal piers and a solid parapet with weathered coping.	II
5–13 Gisburn Road; 53.94006°N 2.32607°W		Early 19th century	A row of five sandstone houses with a slate roof in two storeys. The houses have one or two bays, and most of the windows are mullioned. The doorways have plain surrounds, and No. 9 has a square porch.	II
Chadwick's Farmhouse; 53.94498°N 2.33663°W	—	Early 19th century	A sandstone house with a stone-slate roof, in two storeys and two bays. There are three-light sash windows with mullions, and the doorway has a plain surround and a moulded pediment on consoles.	II
Holden Chapel and house 53.94212°N 2.34995°W		Early 19th century (probable)	The chapel and house are rendered with quoins and a slate roof, and are in two storeys. In the chapel the openings have semicircular heads; there are three windows in the upper storey, and two smaller windows in the lower storey between which is a doorway with a plain surround. The house to the left has two bays and sash windows.	II
Skirden Bridge; 53.93961°N 2.33081°W		Early 19th century (probable)	The bridge carries Main Street over Skirden Beck. It is in sandstone, and consists of a single segmental arch with terminal piers and a solid parapet with weathered coping.	II
Wellhouse, King Henry's Well; 53.93101°N 2.32804°W	—	Early 19th century (probable)	The wellhouse contains an older well. It is mainly in sandstone with a conical slate roof. The building is circular with a maximum height of about 2 metres (6 ft 7 in). There is a doorway on the east side and a window on the south side, both with a plain surround and a pointed head. Inside, the well is surrounded by a circular walkway.	II
21 Main Street and barn 53.94018°N 2.32877°W		1835	The house and barn are in limestone with sandstone dressings and a stone-slate roof in two storeys. The windows are mullioned and transomed, and the doorways have chamfered surrounds and Tudor arched heads. In the centre is a wide entrance, also with a Tudor arched head. (Note: Street View in April 2009 shows that the house has been converted for domestic use.)	II
Old Rectory; 53.93952°N 2.32753°W		c. 1840	The former rectory is in stone with a hipped slate roof in two storeys. It has a front of four bays, flanked by pilaster strips. The windows are sashes with architraves. The entrance is through a wing at the rear.	II
23 Main Street; 53.94017°N 2.32860°W		Mid-19th century	The house is in limestone with sandstone dressings and a hipped slate roof and has one storey. One bay faces south, and one faces east, with the doorway across the angle between. The windows are mullioned and transomed, and the doorway has a chamfered surround and a Tudor arched head.	II
Gate piers, Bolton Hall Drive; 53.93977°N 2.32621°W		19th century (probable)	There are two pairs of gate piers, a taller pair on each side of the drive, and flanking these a smaller pair outside the pedestrian gateways. They are all square, in rusticated sandstone, and each pier has a moulded cornice, a moulded top, and a ball finial.	II
Wall, steps and gate piers, St Peter and St Paul's Church; 53.93996°N 2.32673°W		19th century (probable)	The wall is mainly in sandstone and has triangular coping. There are steps at the east end, and the wall contains two gate piers. These are square with moulded cornices, shaped finials and balls, and are linked by an iron lamp support.	II
Old Courthouse; 53.94049°N 2.32473°W		1859	The house is mainly in limestone with sandstone dressings and a stone-slate roof. On the front is a two-storey gabled porch; to the left of the porch the house is in three storeys, and in two storeys to the right. The doorway has a chamfered surround and a pointed arch. Above it is an inscribed plaque and a mullioned window. Elsewhere the windows are mullioned or sashes. On the roof is a square louvre with a weathervane. The right gable has external steps leading to a first floor doorway, and the left gable contains a re-set shaped inscribed lintel.	II
Primary School and School House; 53.94015°N 2.32362°W		1874	The school and house are by Paley and Austin, and the school was extended in 1906. They are in limestone with sandstone dressings and slate roofs. Both have mullioned and transomed windows. The school is in one storey, the south face is gabled with a bellcote and a porch that has a doorway with a chamfered surround and a Tudor arched head. The house to the right has two storeys, hipped roofs, and a two-storey timber canted bay window.	II
8 and 8a Main Street; 53.93984°N 2.32973°W		Late 19th century	Two houses, part of a row, possibly converted from an earlier building. They are in limestone with sandstone dressings and a stone-slate roof, and have two storeys. The windows are sashes. No. 8 has a doorway with chamfered jambs and a re-set shaped lintel. No 8a, to the left has a doorway with a plain surround, and external stone steps leading to a first floor doorway.	II
10 and 12 Main Street; 53.93991°N 2.32943°W		Late 19th century	A pair of houses in stone with a stone-slate roof in two storeys. Some of the windows are mullioned, others are modern. The doorways have plain surrounds.	II
Stocks; 53.94031°N 2.32836°W		Uncertain	The stocks consist of two sandstone side pieces with grooves containing modern wooden boards.	II

== Notes and references ==
=== Sources ===
- Historic England, "Bolton Peel Cross, Bolton-by-Bowland (1072173)", National Heritage List for England
- Historic England, "Cross base on east side of drive to Bolton Hall, approximately 680 metres south of Church, Bolton-by-Bowland (1362311)", National Heritage List for England
- Historic England, "Cross base, 90 metres west of Bolton Mill, Bolton-by-Bowland (1163307)", National Heritage List for England
- Historic England, "Stump Cross, Bolton-by-Bowland (1309278)", National Heritage List for England
- Historic England, "Village Cross, Bolton-by-Bowland (1163351)", National Heritage List for England
- Historic England, "Church of St. Peter and St. Paul, Bolton-by-Bowland (1362287)", National Heritage List for England
- Historic England, "Barn 13 metres north of Bolton Peel Farmhouse, Bolton-by-Bowland (1072172)", National Heritage List for England
- Historic England, "Barn adjoining to south-west of Howgills House, Bolton-by-Bowland (1072208)", National Heritage List for England
- Historic England, "Bolton Peel Farmhouse, Bolton-by-Bowland (1362310)", National Heritage List for England
- Historic England, "Fox Ghyll, Bolton-by-Bowland (1072174)", National Heritage List for England
- Historic England, "Nos. 9 and 11 Main Street, Bolton-by-Bowland (1072209)", National Heritage List for England
- Historic England, "Fooden Farmhouse, Bolton-by-Bowland (1362286)", National Heritage List for England
- Historic England, "Fooden Hall, Bolton-by-Bowland (1072201)", National Heritage List for England
- Historic England, "Hungrill Farmhouse, Bolton-by-Bowland (1362312)", National Heritage List for England
- Historic England, "Wycongill Farmhouse, Bolton-by-Bowland (1163199)", National Heritage List for England
- Historic England, "Beckfoot Farmhouse and farm building adjoining to west, Bolton-by-Bowland (1072171)", National Heritage List for England
- Historic England, "Broxup House and Broxup Cottage, Bolton-by-Bowland (1072206)", National Heritage List for England
- Historic England, "Higher Heights Farmhouse and farm buildings in same range, Bolton-by-Bowland (1163344)", National Heritage List for England
- Historic England, "Stoop Lane Farmhouse, Bolton-by-Bowland (1072170)", National Heritage List for England
- Historic England, "Alder House, Bolton-by-Bowland (1072207)", National Heritage List for England
- Historic England, "No. 4 (Primrose Cottage) and No. 6 Main Street, Bolton-by-Bowland (1163227)", National Heritage List for England
- Historic England, "Fernside, Bolton-by-Bowland (1072204)", National Heritage List for England
- Historic England, "Nos. 13 and 15 Hellifield Road, Bolton-by-Bowland (1072205)", National Heritage List for England
- Historic England, "No. 14 Main Street, Bolton-by-Bowland (1072168)", National Heritage List for England
- Historic England, "Church Gates, Bolton-by-Bowland (1163144)", National Heritage List for England
- Historic England, "The Coach and Horses Public House, Bolton-by-Bowland (1362308)", National Heritage List for England
- Historic England, "Sundial base in south-west corner of churchyard, Church of St. Peter and St. Paul, Bolton-by-Bowland (1309300)", National Heritage List for England
- Historic England, "Greaves, Bolton-by-Bowland (1163205)", National Heritage List for England
- Historic England, "Forest Becks Bridge, Bolton-by-Bowland (1362309)", National Heritage List for England
- Historic England, "Nos. 5, 7, 9, 11, and 13 Gisburn Road, Bolton-by-Bowland (1163166)", National Heritage List for England
- Historic England, "Chadwick's Farmhouse, Bolton-by-Bowland (1072169)", National Heritage List for England
- Historic England, "Holden Chapel and house adjoining to north, Bolton-by-Bowland (1309330)", National Heritage List for England
- Historic England, "Skirden Bridge, Bolton-by-Bowland (1163214)", National Heritage List for England
- Historic England, "Wellhouse, King Henry's Well, Bolton-by-Bowland (1163356)", National Heritage List for England
- Historic England, "No. 21 Main Street and barn adjoining to east, Bolton-by-Bowland (1309254)", National Heritage List for England
- Historic England, "The Old Rectory, Bolton-by-Bowland (1163179)", National Heritage List for England
- Historic England, "No. 23 Main Street, Bolton-by-Bowland (1072210)", National Heritage List for England
- Historic England, "2 pairs of gatepiers southeast of church, at entrance to Bolton Hall drive, Bolton-by-Bowland (1362288)", National Heritage List for England
- Historic England, "Wall, steps and gatepiers south of Church of St. Peter and St. Paul, Bolton-by-Bowland (1072202)", National Heritage List for England
- Historic England, "Old Courthouse, Bolton-by-Bowland (1163189)", National Heritage List for England
- Historic England, "Bolton-by-Bowland Church of England Primary School and School House (1072203)", National Heritage List for England
- Historic England, "Nos. 8 and 8a Main Street, Bolton-by-Bowland (1072211)", National Heritage List for England
- Historic England, "Nos. 10 and 12 Main Street, Bolton-by-Bowland (1362307)", National Heritage List for England
- Historic England, "Stocks, adjacent to the west of Village Cross, Bolton-by-Bowland (1072175)", National Heritage List for England
- Historic England, Listed Buildings
