= Manor House, Gisburn Forest =

Manor House
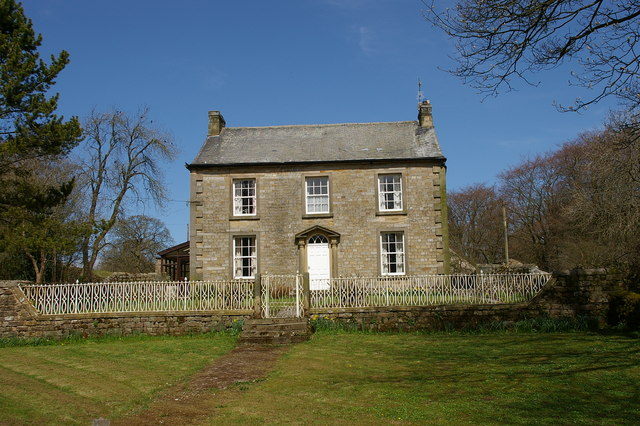
- The building in 2006

- Location within Lancashire
- 53.98349°N 2.33578°W
- Location: Gisburn Forest, Lancashire, England

History
- Built: early 18th century

Site notes
- Area: Ribble Valley

Listed Building – Grade II
- Designated: 20 February 1984
- Reference no.: 1362313

Manor House is a historic building in Gisburn Forest, Lancashire, England. It was built in the early 18th century, but contains a section that is believed to date to the 13th century. It has been designated a Grade II listed building by Historic England.

It is a sandstone house with projecting quoins and a slate roof. It has two storeys with an attic, and a symmetrical three-bay front. The windows are sashes with plain surrounds. The doorway has attached Tuscan columns, an open pediment, and a semicircular head with a fanlight.

In 1822, the "Manor of Gisburn Forest properly belongs to the lord of the Percy Fee," but the abbot and convent of Sallay owned the wood and herbage. It came into the ownership of Thomas Browne, of Burton-upon-Trent around that time.

== See also ==
- Listed buildings in Gisburn Forest
