= Tosside =

Village on the Lancashire and North Yorkshire border in England

- Village
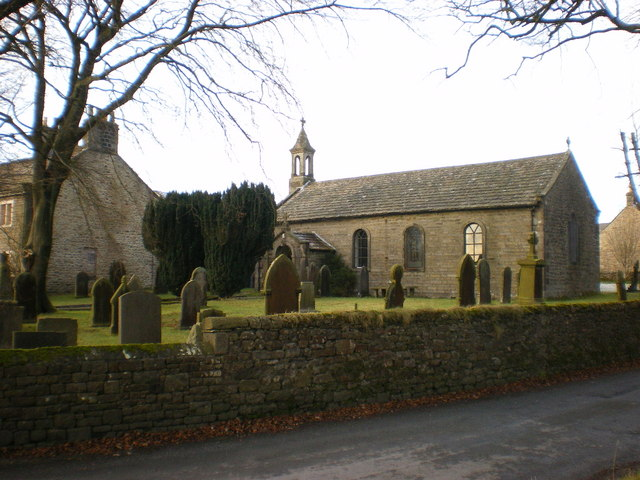
- St Bartholomew's Church, Tosside

- Location in Ribble Valley Borough Location in the Forest of Bowland Location within North Yorkshire Location within Lancashire
- OS grid reference: SD768559
- Civil parish: Gisburn Forest; Wigglesworth
- District: Ribble Valley
- Unitary authority: North Yorkshire
- Shire county: Lancashire
- Ceremonial county: North Yorkshire; Lancashire
- Region: North West; Yorkshire and the Humber
- Country: England
- Sovereign state: United Kingdom
- Post town: SKIPTON
- Postcode district: BD23
- Dialling code: 01729
- Police: Lancashire
- Fire: Lancashire
- Ambulance: North West
- UK Parliament: Ribble Valley; Skipton and Ripon

Tosside is a small village on the modern border of North Yorkshire and Lancashire in Northern England. It lies within the Forest of Bowland, and is between the villages of Slaidburn in Lancashire and Wigglesworth in North Yorkshire. It lies 11.5 miles north of Clitheroe and 17 miles north-west of Skipton. The village is 870 feet (270 m) above sea level and lies at 54.0001°N / 2.35436°W on the B6478 road.

Most of the village is in the modern Lancashire county, but some houses in the eastern part of the village are in the parish of Wigglesworth, in the county of North Yorkshire. Historically, the entire village lies within the West Riding of Yorkshire.

The western part of Tosside is the largest settlement in the civil parish of Gisburn Forest.

== History ==
The name Tosside is believed to be derived from Old Norse/Anglo-Saxon. It can be traced back to two old Scandinavian words - 'Tod' meaning fox and 'Saetr' meaning a high summer pasture. The name gradually changed to Toddsett, then Tossett and ultimately to Tosside. This fact is recognised to this day with the symbol of the fox being present on the top of the small water fountain at the centre of the village.

The western part of Tosside was historically in the township of Gisburn Forest in the large ancient parish of Gisburn. Gisburn Forest became a separate civil parish in 1866. In 1974 it was transferred from the West Riding of Yorkshire to Lancashire.

The eastern part of Tosside was an extra parochial area known as Tosside Row. It became the civil parish of Tosside in 1858. In 1931 the parish had a population of 62. In 1938 the civil parish was abolished and absorbed into the civil parish of Wigglesworth. In 1974 Wigglesworth was transferred from the West Riding of Yorkshire to North Yorkshire.

== Village today ==
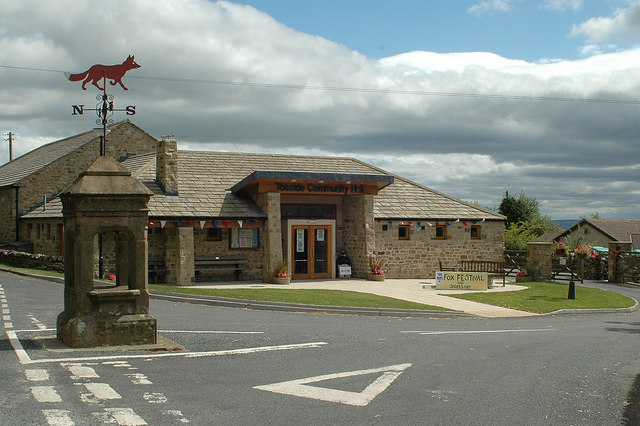
Tosside Community Hall

Tosside has a population of around 100 families scattered across a widespread area, living typically in upland farms and other remote dwellings.

The village itself includes a number of Grade II listed buildings, including St Bartholomew's Church, Mount Sion Independent Chapel (1812, now closed), also known as Sandy Syke Chapel, and the ex Dog and Partridge public house, now a private house.

The Village Community Hall provides a focal point for this active local community. The hall may be hired for special events and functions.

The village adjoins Gisburn Forest to the north and provides access to the forest via Bailey Lane. Gisburn Forest is the largest forest in Lancashire and is a location for mountain-biking, walking and horse-riding.

== See also ==
- Listed buildings in Gisburn Forest
