= Listed buildings in Wigglesworth =

Wigglesworth is a civil parish in the county of North Yorkshire, England. It contains 14 listed buildings that are recorded in the National Heritage List for England. All the listed buildings are designated at Grade II, the lowest of the three grades, which is applied to "buildings of national importance and special interest". The parish contains the village of Wigglesworth and the surrounding countryside. Most of the listed buildings are farmhouses and farm buildings, and the others include a wellhead and a telephone kiosk.

== Buildings ==
Name and location	Photograph	Date	Notes
Wigglesworth Hall Barn; 54.01317°N 2.28788°W	—	c.1690	The barn, later divided into two barns, is in stone with a corrugated iron roof and eleven bays. It contains entrances with chamfered surrounds, one with a Tudor arch, and rows of chamfered vents.
Deepdale Head Farmhouse and wall 53.99581°N 2.26972°W	—	17th century	The farmhouse is in stone, with millstone grit dressings, and a stone slate roof. There are three storeys and four bays. The doorway has a chamfered surround and a segmental pointed head. The windows are mullioned, those in the lower two floors with hood moulds. Inside, there is an inglenook fireplace. The garden wall is in stone, and incorporates 17th-century chamfered entrance with a segmental pointed arch.
Wigglesworth Hall Farm North; 54.01463°N 2.28846°W	—	17th century	The farmhouse is in millstone grit with a stone slate roof. There are two storeys and an L-shaped plan, with a front of three bays. It contains mullioned windows, some with hood moulds. To the right is a projecting 15th-century segmental archway with moulded imposts and a hood mould.
Store north of Hard Head Farmhouse; 54.02210°N 2.31210°W		Mid to late 17th century	A farmhouse later used for other purposes, in stone, with a stone slate roof, two storeys and two bays. The central entrance has a chamfered surround and a Tudor arched lintel. The windows are mullioned, and on the upper floor is a loft entrance.
Spa Wellhead; 54.00667°N 2.29869°W	—	1666	The wellhead is in stone and about 1 metre (3 ft 3 in) in height. The entrance has an inscribed lintel with a basket arch and a capstone.
Crow Trees Inn; 53.99757°N 2.33685°W		Late 17th century	The public house is in stone with eaves modillions and a stone slate roof. There are two storeys and four bays. The doorway has a pain surround and a hood, there are two later sash windows, and the other windows are mullioned.
Lower Pythorns Farmhouse; 54.00629°N 2.32393°W	—	Late 17th century	The farmhouse is in limewashed stone with painted stone dressings, and a stone slate roof. There are two storeys and two bays. The doorway has a plain surround, and the windows are mullioned, containing casements and fixed lights.
Wigglesworth Hall Farm South; 54.01453°N 2.28865°W	—	c.1690	The farmhouse is in stone, with millstone grit dressings, shaped eaves modillions, and a stone slate roof with kneelers, coping, and a ball finial on the left gable. There are two storeys and five bays. The central doorway has a moulded surround, and the windows are cross windows, one blocked, and the others with casements.
Dam Head; 54.00024°N 2.33940°W	—	Late 17th or early 18th century	A farmhouse and stables, later a private house, in limewashed stone, with painted stone dressings and a stone slate roof. There are two storeys and four bays. The doorway has a plain surround, and the windows are mullioned, containing a mix of sashes, casements and fixed lights.
Walled Orchard south of Wigglesworth Hall Farm South; 54.01424°N 2.28806°W	—	Late 17th or early 18th century (probable)	The walls are in stone and enclose the orchard. They are about 2 metres (6 ft 7 in) in height, and have moulded coping. The north entrance has a segmental arch and is blocked, and the west entrance is collapsed.
Teenley House and barn 54.00797°N 2.29140°W	—	c. 1840	A farmhouse and barn, the barn incorporated into the house, in stone with a stone slate roof. There are two storeys and four bays. The doorway has a plain surround, a rectangular fanlight and a moulded hood, and the windows are sashes with stone surrounds.
Lane Side Farmhouse; 53.99420°N 2.30233°W		Late 19th century	The farmhouse, which has earlier origins, is rendered, with painted stone dressings, and a stone slate roof. There are two storeys and two bays. The doorway has a chamfered surround, and the windows are mullioned, containing casements and fixed lights.
Calf shed northeast of Wigglesworth Hall Farm North; 54.01471°N 2.28823°W	—	Early 20th century	The building is in stone, with millstone grit dressings and a slate roof. There are three bays. One entrance dates from the 15th century and has a moulded surround and a pointed head.
Telephone kiosk 54.00792°N 2.29176°W		1935	The telephone kiosk opposite the Plough Inn is of the K6 type designed by Giles Gilbert Scott. Constructed in cast iron with a square plan and a dome, it has three unperforated crowns in the top panels.
