= Sawley, Lancashire =

Village in Lancashire, England

Coordinates: 53.914°N 2.341°W

Sawley
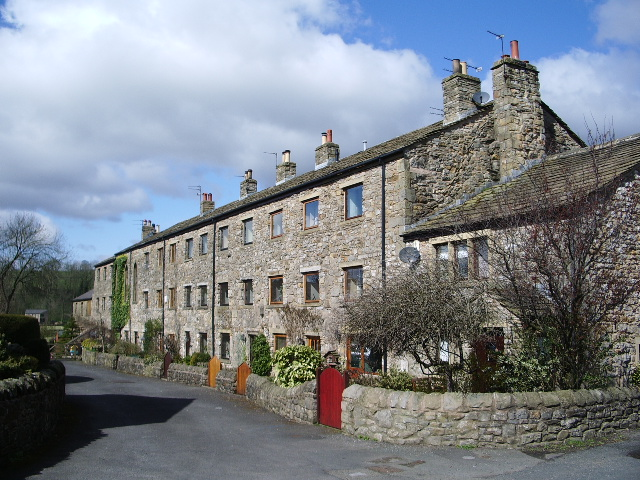
- Sawley

- Shown within Ribble Valley Location within Lancashire
- Population: 345 (2011 Census)
- OS grid reference: SD776465
- Civil parish: Sawley
- District: Ribble Valley
- Shire county: Lancashire
- Region: North West
- Country: England
- Sovereign state: United Kingdom
- Post town: CLITHEROE
- Postcode district: BB7
- Dialling code: 01200
- Police: Lancashire
- Fire: Lancashire
- Ambulance: North West
- UK Parliament: Ribble Valley

Sawley is a village and civil parish in the Borough of Ribble Valley in Lancashire, England. The population of the civil parish was 305 at the 2001 Census, rising to 345 at the 2011 census. It is situated north-east of Clitheroe, on the River Ribble. It was historically part of the West Riding of Yorkshire.

The parish adjoins the Ribble Valley parishes of Bolton-by-Bowland, Paythorne, Gisburn, Rimington, Downham, Chatburn and Grindleton.

== History ==
Historically, Sawley fell under the Earl of Northumberland's Percy fee rather than being part of the neighbouring Lordship of Bowland. Sawley Abbey, a ruined abbey of Cistercian monks, is in the village. The abbey was founded in 1147 and dissolved in 1536. By the early 17th-century, the manor had come into the possession of James Hay, who in 1615 was created Lord Hay of Sawley, and later 1st Earl of Carlisle.

== Governance ==
Sawley was an extra-parochial area in the Staincliffe Wapentake of the West Riding of Yorkshire. This became a civil parish in 1858, forming part of the Bowland Rural District from 1894 to 1974. The civil parish previously had a detached area on the southern side of Gisburn with a smaller part of that parish on the western side of Sawley. In 1938 these areas were joined with the respective parishes. It has since become part of the Lancashire borough of Ribble Valley. Sawley shares a parish council with two other parishes, Bolton-by-Bowland and Gisburn Forest.

Along with Waddington, West Bradford and Grindleton, the parish forms the Waddington and West Bradford ward of Ribble Valley Borough Council.

== Media gallery ==
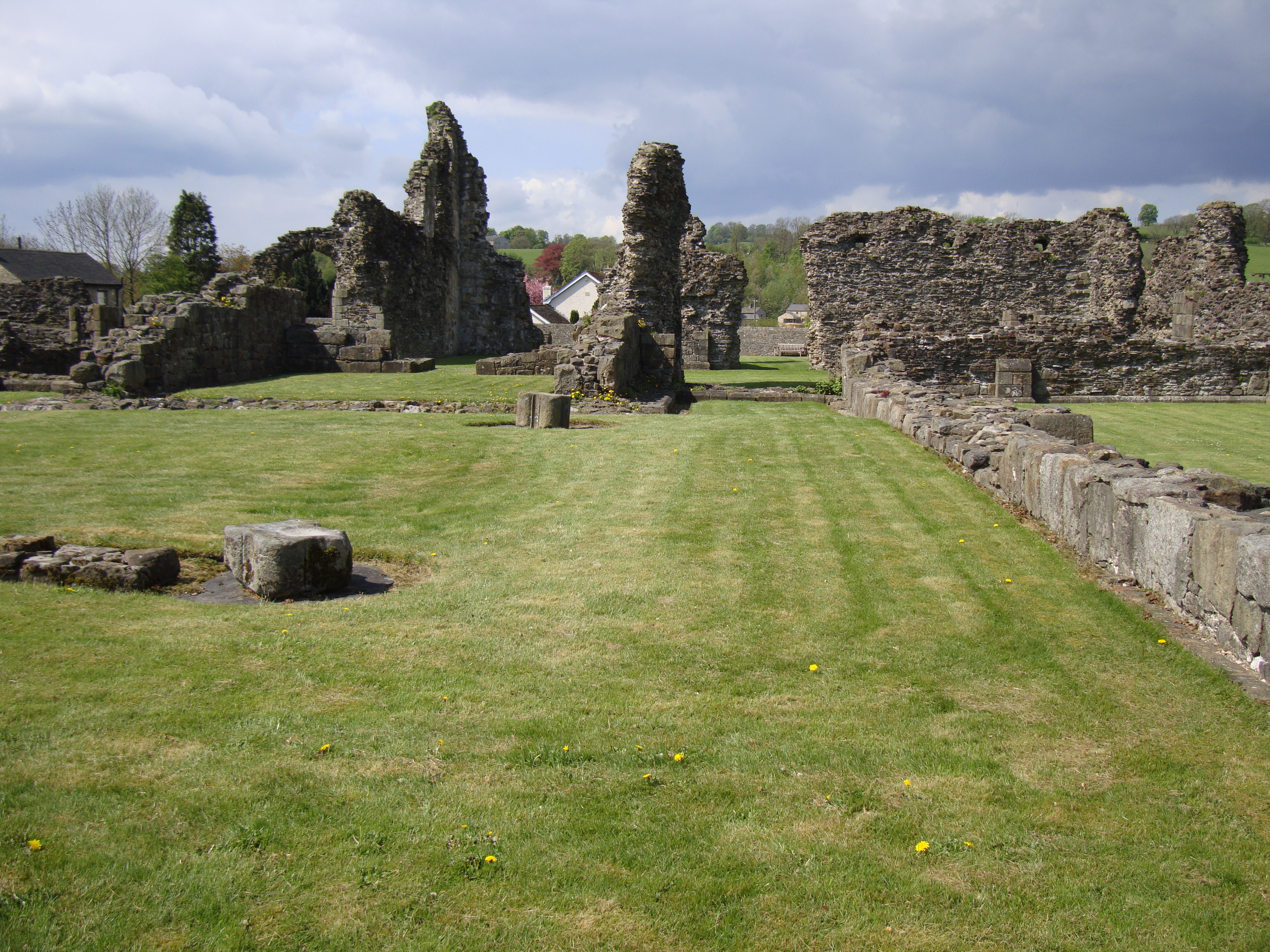
The ruins of Sawley Abbey.

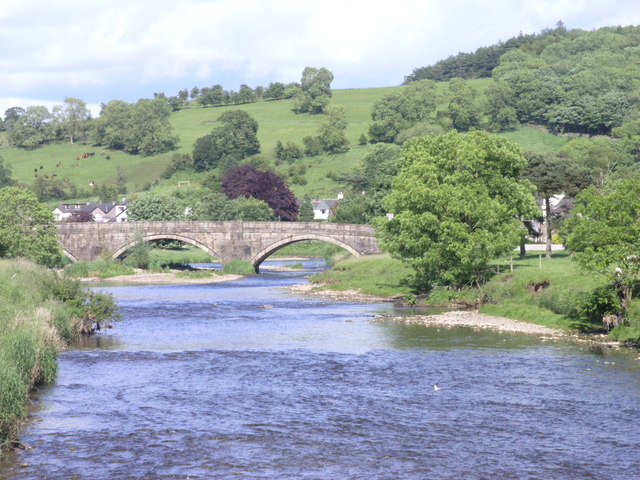
Sawley Bridge on the River Ribble.

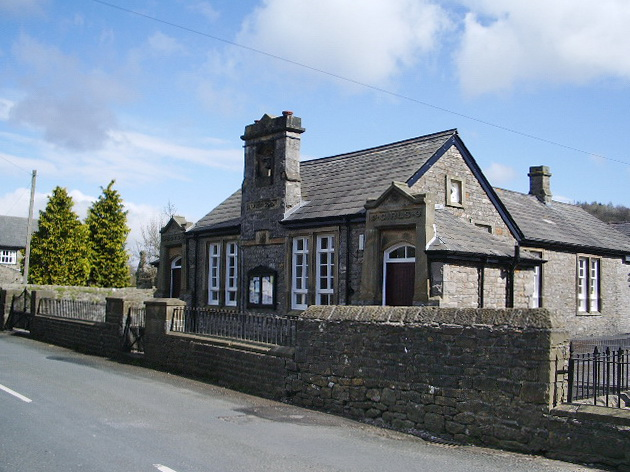
Former Sawley School, now the Village Hall.

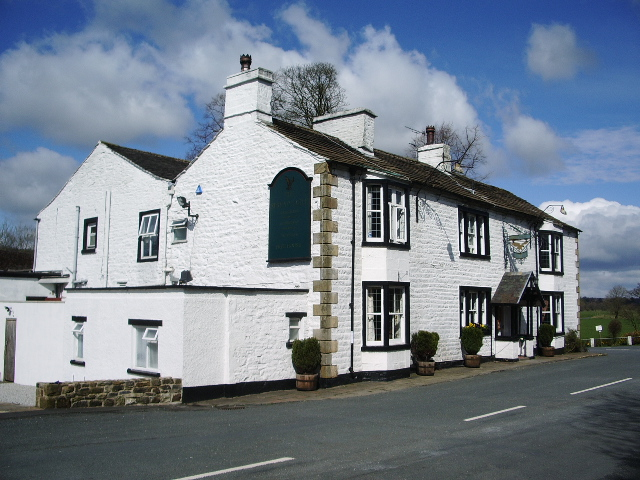
The Spread Eagle.

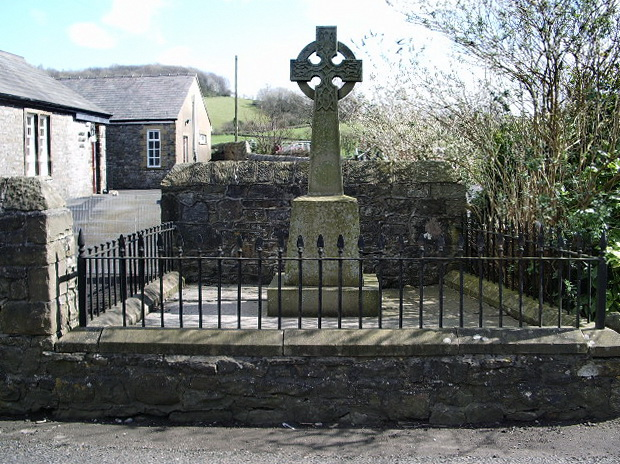
War Memorial.

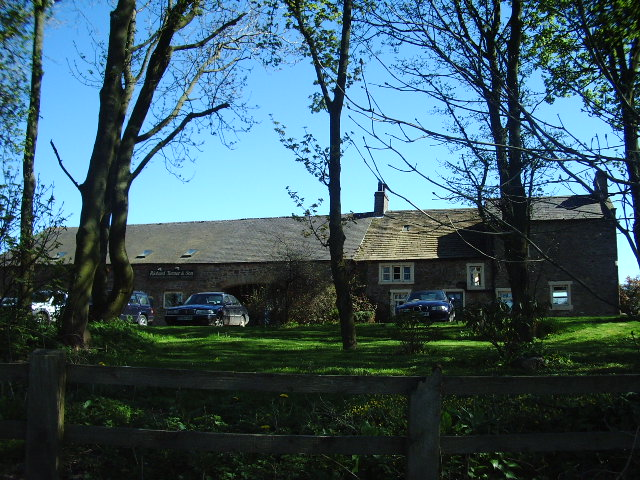
Sawley Grange Farm.

== See also ==
- Listed buildings in Sawley, Lancashire
- Beat-Herder
