= Skirden Beck =

Minor river in Lancashire, England

Coordinates: 53.9254°N 2.3349°W

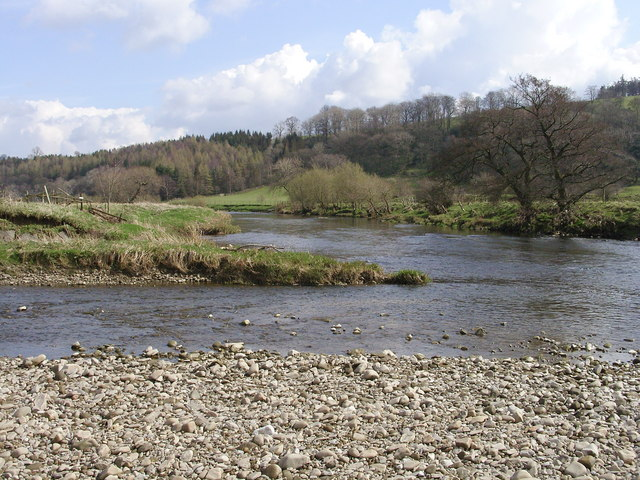
The confluence of Skirden Beck with the Ribble

Skirden Beck is a minor river in Lancashire, England (historically in the West Riding of Yorkshire). It is approximately 4.3 miles (6.85 km) long and has a catchment area of 18.87 square miles (48.882 km^{2}). (Note: Measured using mapping website.)

The Beck is formed at the confluence of New Gill Beck and Grunsagill Beck and flows southward, being joined by Grainings Clough and then Monubent Beck (at Forest Becks near Skirden). After passing through Bolton-by-Bowland village it collects Bier Beck and Kirk Beck, before passing Bolton Mill. The confluence with Holden Beck occurs just before Skirden Beck falls into the River Ribble near Briery Bank Wood.

== Tributaries ==
=== Holden Beck ===
Holden Beck rises at Dugdales where Threap Green Brook (falling south from Ling Hill picks up another stream near Greenwoods) and flows southwards to its confluence with Skirden Beck. Through Alder House Wood and Clough Wood, between Mear Gill Top and Holden, this stream takes the name Mear Gill.

- Fell Brook rises on Grindleton Fell and drains into Mear Gill at Mear Gill Top.
  - Bay Gate Brook, rising near Higher Heights, joins near Bay Gate.
  - Far Fields Brook joins near Harrop Gate, having risen to the south on Grindleton Fell.
  - Black Brook rises near Bambers and skirts to the north of Harrop Fell, joining Fell Brook close to the medieval village of Harrop Fold.

=== Kirk Beck ===
Like Skirden Beck, Kirk Beck flows through Bolton-by-Bowland. Prior to this, it is known as Fox Gill Beck (Fox Ghyll is just to the north of Bolton-by-Bowland). Fox Gill Beck rises near Monubent.

- Gill Bottom Beck rises near Small Field Plantation and joins Fox Gill Beck at Ghyll Bottom.

=== Bier Beck ===
Bier Beck rises just above Big Holme.

- Hungrill Beck rises between Anna Lane Head and Mear Gill Farm.
  - Higher Syke joins near Wycongill. It is formed at the confluence of Bleara Syke (rising at New Barn) and Varleys Syke (whose source is near Knotts).
- Cuddy Syke rises near Lodge Farm.

=== Monubent Beck ===
Monubent Beck flows west then north, joining Skirden Beck at Forest Becks. It is swollen by Hen Gill Beck, itself picking up Agden Beck, known above Mere Syke Bridge as Mere Syke.

=== Grunsagill Beck ===
Grunsagill Beck and New Gill Beck meet near Brackenhurst.

Grunsagill Beck, before Grunsagill is known as Tosside Beck. Tosside Beck flows south from Bent House, prior to which it is known as Holden Beck or Moor End Beck.

=== New Gill Beck ===
New Gill Beck flows from Beckfoot, above which it is known as Bond Beck. Bond Beck rises in Skirden Hall Plantation. It flows south by south east past Ghylls.

- Walkers Clough is a short stream running east from Knotts to its meeting with New Gill Beck at Beckfoot.
- Little Beck flows east from Stephen Moor to Butter Fields, where it joins Bond Beck.
- Sandy Syke rises at Black Hill in Gisburn Forest.

Next confluence upstream	River Ribble	Next confluence downstream
Stock Beck (South)	Skirden Beck	Bashall Brook (North)
