= Listed buildings in Sawley, Lancashire =

Sawley is a civil parish in Ribble Valley, Lancashire, England. It contains twelve listed buildings that are recorded in the National Heritage List for England. Of these, one is listed at Grade I, the highest of the three grades, and the others are at Grade II, the lowest grade. The parish contains the village of Sawley and surrounding countryside. The most important building is Sawley Abbey, now in ruins; it is listed and is also a scheduled monument. Most of the other listed buildings are houses and associated structures, and farmhouses and farm buildings. In addition there are two bridges, a public house, and a milestone that are listed.

== Key ==
Grade	Criteria
I	Buildings of exceptional interest, sometimes considered to be internationally important
II	Buildings of national importance and special interest

== Buildings ==
Name and location	Photograph	Date	Notes	Grade
Sawley Abbey Ruins; 53.9136°N 2.3416°W		1147	The Cistercian abbey was dissolved in 1536, and the building is now a ruin in rubble stone with some sandstone dressings. Parts of the walls of the transepts, chapels. and the nave survive, but only the foundations and lower walls of the monastery buildings. There is also a fireplace with a segmental arch and a bread oven, which may date from after the Reformation. The ruins are also a scheduled monument.	I
Abbey Cottage; 53.91319°N 2.34232°W	—	Late medieval	The house, that has been altered, is in stone with a roof of imitation stone slates, and has two storeys. The windows are irregularly placed, they have plain surrounds, and some are mullioned. On the south front is an outshut, and a single-storey gabled porch dating from the 20th century.	II
Swanside Bridge; 53.90415°N 2.32881°W		17th century (or earlier)	The bridge crosses Smithies Brook, and is in limestone. It consists of a single high segmental arch, without parapets. The bridge is about 2 metres (6 ft 7 in) wide.	II
Arches Cottage; 53.91436°N 2.34218°W	—	c. 1600 (possible)	A pair of stone houses in two storeys. The western house (on the left) has mullioned windows and a single-storey gabled porch. The other house has sash windows and a doorway with a chamfered surround.	II
Greenhead Farmhouse South; 53.91103°N 2.33104°W	—	1711	A stone house with a slate roof in two storeys. There is a central two-storey gabled porch flanked by one bay on each side. The doorway has moulded jambs and a shaped lintel, above which is an inscribed plaque. Over this is a three-light stepped and mullioned window, the middle light having a round head. The other windows are modern.	II
Southport Farmhouse; 53.91119°N 2.34198°W	—	1720	The house is rendered with a tile roof, and has two storeys and two bays. The central doorway has a chamfered surround, and an elaborately shaped lintel, above which is an inscribed plaque. The windows in the left bay are mullioned, and those in the right bay are sashes. On the front is a re-set carved stone, formerly in Sawley Abbey.	II
Rodhill Gate Farmhouse; 53.92510°N 2.35458°W	—	Early 18th century	A sandstone house with a stone-slate roof, in two storeys and two bays. In the centre is a modern gabled porch, and the doorway has an architrave. The windows are mullioned and transomed.	II
Sawley Bridge; 53.91511°N 2.34426°W		c. 1800 (probable)	The bridge carries Sawley Road over the River Ribble. It is in sandstone, and consists of three segmental arches with triangular cutwaters. The bridge has piers, a string course, and solid parapets with weathered copings.	II
Sawley Grange Farmhouse and barn 53.91725°N 2.31746°W		c. 1800	The house and barn are in stone and rendered at the rear. The house has a stone-slate roof and is in two storeys. Some of the windows are sashes and others are mullioned, and the doorway has a plain surround. To the right, the barn has a slate roof, and contains a wide entrance. Inside are the remains of an aisled building dating from about 1500.	II
Ivy Cottage and attached buildings 53.91267°N 2.34294°W		Early 19th century (probable)	A row of sandstone buildings with a stone-slate roof that have been used for a variety of purposes, and which incorporate earlier material. Ivy Cottage, at the east end, is in two storeys and one bay, and has three-light mullioned windows. The rest of the range has three storeys, and there are five doorways. Adjacent to the cottage is a Methodist chapel with three semicircular arched windows in the middle floor. The other windows have flat heads and plain surrounds.	II
Spread Eagle Hotel; 53.91488°N 2.34172°W		Early 19th century	The public house is in stone with chamfered quoins and a stone-slate roof. It has two storeys and three bays, and the windows are sashes. In the outer bays are two-storey canted bay windows, and in the centre of the upper floor is three-light mullioned window. The doorway has a plain surround and a timber porch.	II
Milestone; 53.91452°N 2.32799°W	—	c. 1900	The milestone is in cast iron on a sandstone base. Its lower part is triangular, and the upper part is rectangular. Both parts carry inscriptions, those in the lower part indicating the distances in miles to Skipton and to Clitheroe.	II
