= St Peter and St Paul's Church, Bolton-by-Bowland =

Coordinates: 53.9402°N 2.3267°W

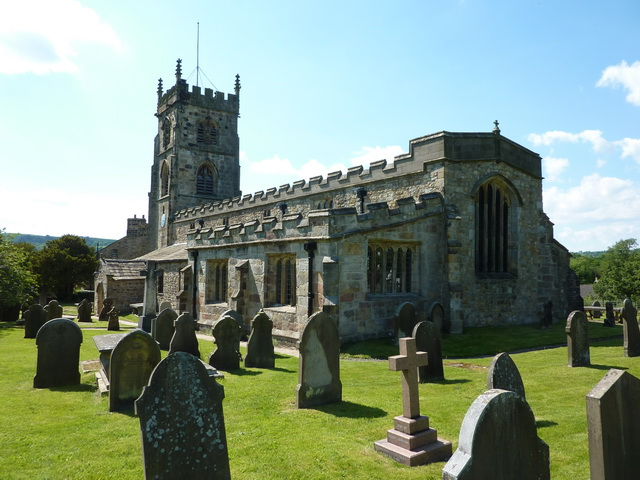
- St Peter and St Paul's Church, Bolton-by-Bowland, from the southeast

- Location in the Borough of Ribble Valley
- OS grid reference: SD 787,494
- Location: Gisburn Road, Bolton-by-Bowland, Lancashire
- Country: England
- Denomination: Anglican
- Website: St Peter and St Paul, Bolton-by-Bowland

History
- Status: Parish church

Architecture
- Functional status: Active
- Heritage designation: Grade I
- Designated: 16 November 1954
- Architect: Paley and Austin (restoration)
- Architectural type: Church
- Style: English Gothic

Specifications
- Materials: Sandstone, roofs of stone slate and lead

Administration
- Province: York
- Diocese: Blackburn
- Archdeaconry: Blackburn
- Deanery: Whalley
- Parish: Bolton by Bowland

Clergy
- Rector: Revd Mark J Williams

St Peter and St Paul's Church is in Gisburn Road, Bolton-by-Bowland, Lancashire, England. It is an active Anglican parish church in the deanery of Whalley, the archdeaconry of Blackburn, and the Diocese of Blackburn. Its benefice is united with that of St Ambrose, Grindleton. The church is recorded in the National Heritage List for England as a designated Grade I listed building.

== History ==
A church has been on the site since at least 1190, and the present church contains some 13th-century fabric. Almost all the church dates from the middle of the 15th century, when it was built by Sir Ralph Pudsay, the Lord of the manor of Bolton, and completed in about 1466. The Pudsay Chapel was added in the early 16th century. In 1885–86 the church was restored by the Lancaster architects Paley and Austin who added a new roof and parapets. The tower was restored in 1994.

== Architecture ==
=== Exterior ===
The church is constructed in sandstone with roofs of stone slate and lead. Its plan consists of a nave and chancel with a clerestory under a continuous roof, north and south aisles, a southeast (Pudsay) chapel, a south porch, and a west tower. In the bottom stage of the tower is a west doorway, with a four-light window above it. There are two-light bell openings in each of the upper stages, and an embattled parapet with corner pinnacles and gargoyles. Along the sides of the aisles and clerestory are two-light windows, and the east window has five lights. In the south wall of the church is a priest's door that possibly dates from the 13th century. The inner door of the south porch has a lintel partly carved with dog-tooth decoration.

=== Interior ===
Inside the church the five-bay arcades are carried on octagonal piers. In the south wall of the chancel is a piscina, and in the north wall is a recess, probably for a tomb. The octagonal sandstone font dates from the early 16th century. Its bowl is carved with the coats of arms of local families, and has brass plaques inscribed with texts in Latin. The font cover was carved by Robert (Mouseman) Thompson. The pulpit contains panels described as "Flemish baroque". In the arch between the chancel and chapel is the monument to Sir Ralph Pudsay who died in 1468. It is in limestone, and is carved with the figures of Sir Ralph, his three wives, and his 25 children, with their names. The monument stands on a sandstone base. Among the children depicted is Sir Ralph's son, William, who became rector of the church. In the chancel is a Greek Revival tablet from the early 19th century by John Foster. Also in the church are four hatchments. There is stained glass by C. E. Kempe in some of the south aisle windows. The two-manual pipe organ was made in 1886 by Isaac Abbott of Leeds, and restored in 2009 by John Clough. There is a ring of six bells; two of these were cast in about 1420 by John Seliok, one is dated 1749 and is by Edward Seller II, and the newest three are by John Taylor and Company cast in 1958, 1973, and 2005 respectively.

== External features ==
The churchyard contains the war grave of a Royal Dragoons soldier of World War I.

== See also ==
- Grade I listed buildings in Lancashire
- Grade I listed churches in Lancashire
- Listed buildings in Bolton-by-Bowland
- List of ecclesiastical works by Paley and Austin
