= Listed buildings in Grindleton =

Grindleton is a civil parish in Ribble Valley, Lancashire, England. It contains 19 listed buildings that are recorded in the National Heritage List for England. All of the listed buildings are designated at Grade II, the lowest of the three grades, which is applied to "buildings of national importance and special interest". The parish contains the village of Grindleton, and is otherwise rural. Most of the listed buildings are houses and associated structures, farmhouses and farm buildings. The other listed buildings are a church, a Quaker meeting house, and a public house.

== Buildings ==
| Name and location | Photograph | Date | Notes |
|---|---|---|---|
| Green End; 53.91611°N 2.34703°W | — | Late 17th century (possible) | A sandstone house with a stone-slate roof in two storeys. On the front is a modern gabled porch. Most of the windows are mullioned, and on the front is a circular window. |
| Harrop Hall; 53.95502°N 2.40607°W | | Late 17th century | A rendered house with sandstone dressings and a slate roof, in two storeys. It consists of a main range and a cross wing on the right, with a parallel range added later to the rear. Most of the windows are mullioned. The doorway has a moulded surround and a shaped lintel, above which is an inscribed plaque. |
| Gate piers, Harrop Hall; 53.95490°N 2.40606°W | — | Early 18th century | A pair of gate piers in sandstone with a square plan. They have moulded cornices and moulded tops, and finials without their original balls. On the sides is decoration in shallow relief. |
| Fields Farmhouse; 53.90516°N 2.35698°W | — | 1759 | The farmhouse is in sandstone with a slate roof and chamfered quoins. It has two storeys, and a symmetrical two-bay front. The central doorway has Tuscan pilasters, a semicircular head, and an open pediment. Above it is an inscribed plaque with a moulded cornice. The windows on the front have architraves but have lost their mullions. At the rear is a stair window and two mullioned windows. |
| Bay Gate; 53.94549°N 2.37133°W | | Late 18th century | A sandstone house with a slate roof in two storeys and two bays. The windows on the front are sashes with architraves. The doorway has Tuscan pilasters, a moulded semicircular head with a stepped keystone, and a fanlight. Above it is a moulded pediment on console brackets. At the rear of the house is a stair window and a re-set mullioned window. |
| Friends' Meeting House and house adjoining 53.91582°N 2.34750°W | | Late 18th century | The Quaker meeting house, and the house adjoining to the left, are in limestone with sandstone dressings and a stone-slate roof. The windows are sashes. The meeting house has one storey, and the house has two. The meeting house has a double doorway with a plain surround, a semicircular head with a keystone, and a fanlight. The house has a French window. Inside the meeting house is a wide gallery. |
| Lower Asker Hill and barn 53.92261°N 2.37171°W | — | Late 18th century | The house and barn are in stone with a modern tile roof, and have two storeys. The house has two bays, some windows are casements, some are fixed, and in the right bay are three-light stepped windows with mullions. The barn is to the left, and contains wide entrances, a door, and a pitching hole. |
| Old Greenwoods and barn 53.94802°N 2.37200°W | — | Late 18th century | The house and barn are in rendered stone with a stone-slate roof. The house has two storeys, two bays, and mullioned windows. There is a modern porch and a doorway with a plain surround. The barn to the left has an outshut forming a porch, with external steps leading to a first floor doorway. |
| Steelands Farmhouse; 53.91488°N 2.37196°W | | Late 18th century (probable) | A rendered stone house with sandstone dressings and a slate roof. It consists of a main range with three storeys, and a cross wing with two storeys and an attic. The main range has two bays, three-light mullioned windows, and a doorway with a plain surround and a cornice hood. The cross wing has one bay, and contains sash windows with architraves and false keystones. In the attic is an oculus. Also in the cross wing is the re-set part of a cross, which is probably medieval. |
| Swindlehurst Farmhouse; 53.90563°N 2.36796°W | — | Late 18th century | The house contains 17th-century material. It is in pebbledashed stone with sandstone dressings and a slate roof, and has two storeys and three bays. The windows are mullioned, some with architraves, and others with plain surrounds. Th doorway also has a plain surround. |
| White Hall; 53.91129°N 2.37881°W | — | Late 18th century | A pebbledashed house with sandstone dressings and a roof partly of slate and partly of stone-slate. The main part has three storeys and a symmetrical three-bay front. In the centre is a doorway with attached Tuscan columns, a semicircular head, and an open pediment. Above this is a large stair window with an ogee head, a stepped keystone, and impost blocks. It contains a mullion and a transom; the right side has glazing bars, and the left side is painted to resemble glazing bars. The outer bays contain sash windows. To the left is a lower two-storey two-bay wing. |
| Harrop Lodge; 53.95079°N 2.39003°W | — | 1778 | A sandstone house with a stone-slate roof, in two storeys and two bays. Most of the windows are sashes with mullions. The porch has an architrave and a moulded pediment containing an inscription; the inner door has a plain surround. To the left of the porch is a canted bay window, in the right gable wall is a Venetian window, and at the rear is a tall stair window with four transoms. |
| Bank Hall; 53.91285°N 2.34840°W | — | 1780 | The house is in pebbledashed stone with sandstone dressings, quoins, and a slate roof. There are three storeys and three bays, with sash windows, some of which are mullioned. On the right is a canted bay window. The central bay has attached Tuscan columns, a broken fluted entablature, and a semicircular head with a fanlight. At the rear is a tall stair window. |
| Townley House; 53.90548°N 2.36856°W | — | c. 1800 | A pebbledashed house with a slate roof, in two storeys and two bays. The windows are mullioned, those in the ground floor having semicircular heads. The central doorway has a plain surround and a semicircular head. Above it is a re-set datestone, and there is another re-set datestone to the left. |
| St Ambrose's Church; 53.90623°N 2.36326°W | | 1805 | The church was largely rebuilt in 1897–98 by Austin and Paley. It is in sandstone with a slate roof, and consists of a nave, a north aisle, a south porch, a chancel, and a west tower. The tower is in three stages, and has an embattled parapet with corner pinnacles. |
| Duke of York Hotel; 53.90505°N 2.36819°W | | Early 19th century | The public house is in sandstone, with chamfered quoins and a stone-slate roof. There are two storeys with an attic, and the main part has two bays. The windows are sashes, and the central doorway has a plain surround and a moulded open pediment on console brackets. To the left is a single-bay extension. In the right gable wall is an attic window with a semicircular head. |
| Gazebo; 53.91226°N 2.34735°W | — | Early 19th century (probable) | The gazebo is in pebbledashed stone with sandstone dressings. It has a single storey and an embattled parapet. The openings are pointed and have chamfered surrounds. The southwest face has a doorway, and the other faces contain windows. |
| Barn, Harrop Hall; 53.95511°N 2.40592°W | — | Early 19th century (possible) | The barn contains earlier material, and is in sandstone with a slate roof. The west wall has a doorway with a moulded surround, above which is a re-set inscribed plaque. Elsewhere there is a doorway with a chamfered surround, and pitching holes. |
| Bank House; 53.91249°N 2.34908°W | — | Late 19th century (probable) | The house contains material from the 17th and 18th centuries. It is in pebbledashed stone with sandstone dressings and a stone-slate roof, and has two storeys. The east face has three bays, and contains a two-storey bay window, a porch and a doorway with a plain surround, and a blocked doorway with a shaped lintel. At the rear is a doorway with a chamfered surround, and a stair window with an oculus above. Most of the windows are sashes and some are mullioned. |
