= Beat-Herder =

Annual music festival in Sawley, Lancashire, England

- Genre: Electronic music, breakbeat, dub, reggae, dubstep, techno, house, drum and bass, folk, dance-punk and psychedelic rock
- Locations: Sawley, Lancashire
- Website: Official website

Beat-Herder is an annual summer music festival held at Dockber Farm near Sawley, Lancashire, which has been running since 2006. The festival covers several musical genres including breakbeat, dub, reggae, dubstep, techno, house, drum and bass, folk, dance-punk and psychedelic rock. The event also sees regular appearances from novelty musicians such as the Lancashire Hotpots and William Fairey Acid Brass. Bushrocker HI FI regularly host the reggae arena.

In 2006 when it started it was nothing but a small rave in the trees organised by a small group of friends but since then it has grown massively attracting a wide range of audiences with its large variety of acts.

Acts appearing at the 2013 event included Chic (featuring Nile Rodgers), Jimmy Cliff and Bentley Rhythm Ace.

In 2014 Happy Mondays were the headline act on the closing night. Other performers included Boney M., The Orb and Goldie Lookin Chain.

== See also ==
- List of electronic music festivals
