= St Ambrose's Church, Grindleton =

Coordinates: 53.9063°N 2.3632°W

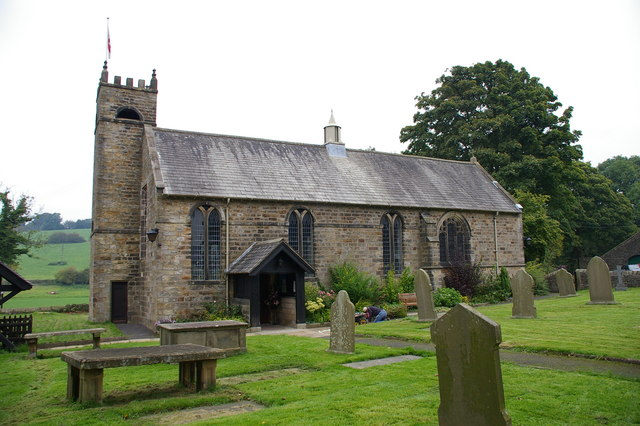
- St Ambrose's Church, Grindleton, from the south

- Location in the Borough of Ribble Valley
- OS grid reference: SD 762 456
- Location: Grindleton, near Clitheroe, Lancashire
- Country: England
- Denomination: Anglican
- Website: www.bowlandbenefice.org

History
- Status: Parish church
- Dedication: Saint Ambrose

Architecture
- Functional status: Active
- Heritage designation: Grade II
- Designated: 20 February 1984
- Architect(s): Austin and Paley (Rebuilding)
- Architectural type: Church
- Style: Gothic Revival
- Groundbreaking: 1805
- Completed: 1898

Specifications
- Materials: Sandstone, slate roofs

Administration
- Province: York
- Diocese: Blackburn
- Archdeaconry: Blackburn
- Deanery: Whalley
- Parish: Grindleton

Clergy
- Rector: Revd Grace Gaze

St Ambrose's Church is in the village of Grindleton, which is situated about 3 miles (5 km) northeast of Clitheroe, Lancashire, England. It is an active Anglican parish church in the deanery of Whalley, the archdeaconry of Blackburn, and the Diocese of Blackburn. Its benefice is united with that of St Peter and St Paul, Bolton by Bowland and St Mary's Church, Gisburn. The church is recorded in the National Heritage List for England as a designated Grade II listed building.

== History ==
The west tower and part of the nave date from 1805. In 1897–98 the Lancaster architects Austin and Paley rebuilt the body of the church, other than its south side. That rebuilding also included replacement of the box pews and the pulpit.

== Architecture ==
The church is constructed in sandstone and has slate roofs. Its plan consists of a three-bay nave, a north aisle, a south porch, a single-bay chancel, and a west tower. The tower is in three stages, with a lunette west window in the middle stage. The top stage contains lunette-shaped bell openings, and the parapet is battlemented with pinnacles at the corners. Each bay contains a two-light window. The south porch is constructed mainly of timber. Between the nave and the chancel is a buttress. The south wall of the chancel contains a three-light window, and the east window has four lights. The west window, and the windows along the north aisle, have two lights each.

Inside the church is a five-bay timber arcade. The chancel contains a double sedilia and a piscina. The stained glass in the east window dates from the late 1800s, and contains depictions of the Four Evangelists. Another window depicts Saint George and Joan of Arc, and beneath it is a memorial to the two world wars. The two-manual organ was built in 1879 by Bevington, and restored and overhauled in 1979 by R. D. Holmes and E. H. Holmes.

== External features ==
The churchyard contains the war graves of three soldiers of World War I, and an airman of World War II.

== See also ==
- Listed buildings in Grindleton
- List of ecclesiastical works by Austin and Paley (1895–1914)
