= Listed buildings in Gisburn Forest =

Gisburn Forest is a civil parish in Ribble Valley, Lancashire, England. It contains ten listed buildings that are recorded in the National Heritage List for England. All of the listed buildings are designated at Grade II, the lowest of the three grades, which is applied to "buildings of national importance and special interest". The parish contains the small village of Tosside, and is otherwise entirely rural. Most of the listed buildings are houses, farmhouses and farm buildings. The other listed buildings are a church, a chapel, and a public house.

== Buildings ==
Name and location	Photograph	Date	Notes
Sedgwicks Farmhouse and farm building 53.99153°N 2.34961°W	—	Late 17th century (possible)	The house and farm building are in sandstone with a slate roof, and have two storeys and two bays. The windows in the house have moulded surrounds, and the doorway has a chamfered surround. The farm building is attached to the right of the house.
Cracoe (or Cracow) Hill Farmhouse; 53.98704°N 2.34812°W	—	1691	A stone house with a stone-slate roof, in two storeys and three bays. The original windows have double-chamfered surrounds. The doorway has a chamfered surround and a shaped inscribed lintel.
Lower Gill Farmhouse; 53.97850°N 2.33524°W	—	1692	A sandstone house with a modern tile roof, in two storeys with mullioned windows. The doorway, in a modern porch, has a moulded surround, a pulvinated frieze and a moulded cornice. Above the doorway is a moulded plaque containing the date.
Geldard Laithe; 54.02104°N 2.37885°W		1702	A barn in sandstone with a slate roof. It has a wide entrance with a segmental arch, doorways, and ventilation slits, all with chamfered surrounds.
Hindley Head; 54.01721°N 2.38320°W	—	Early 18th century	A stone house with a stone-slate roof, in two storeys and three bays. The windows have plain surrounds and are mullioned. The doorway is in an outshut porch, and has a plain surround.
St Bartholomew's Church; 54.00025°N 2.35367°W		Mid to late 18th century	The church, which was restored in 1873, is in sandstone with a stone-slate roof. It consists of a nave and chancel under a continuous roof, and a south porch. On the west gable is a bellcote, and on the east gable and on the gable of the porch are cross finials. The windows and doorways have semicircular heads, and in the east wall is a Venetian window.
Dog and Partridge Public House; 54.00009°N 2.35398°W		Late 18th century (probable)	The public house is in sandstone with a stone-slate roof, and has two storeys and four bays. The windows and doorway have plain surrounds, and some of the windows are mullioned. On the front is a mounting block with four stone steps and a flagged top.
Manor House; 53.98349°N 2.33578°W		Late 18th century	A sandstone house with projecting quoins and a slate roof. It has two storeys with an attic, and a symmetrical three-bay front. The windows are sashes with plain surrounds. The doorway has attached Tuscan columns, an open pediment, and a semicircular head with a fanlight.
Lane Side Farmhouse; 53.97860°N 2.31807°W	—	c. 1800	A stone house with sandstone dressings and a tile roof, in two storeys and two bays. The windows have plain surrounds and are sashes. The doorway has been re-set from elsewhere, and has a moulded surround and a shaped inscribed lintels.
Tosside Chapel and House; 53.99825°N 2.35782°W		1812	The chapel and house are rendered with a stone-slate roof, and have two storeys. The chapel, to the left, has three bays, and the house has two. The doors and windows have plain surrounds. The door to the chapel is in its middle bay, and above it is an oval inscribed plaque.
