= Matilda de Percy =

12th-century noblewoman and heiress, died c. 1204

- Countess of Warwick
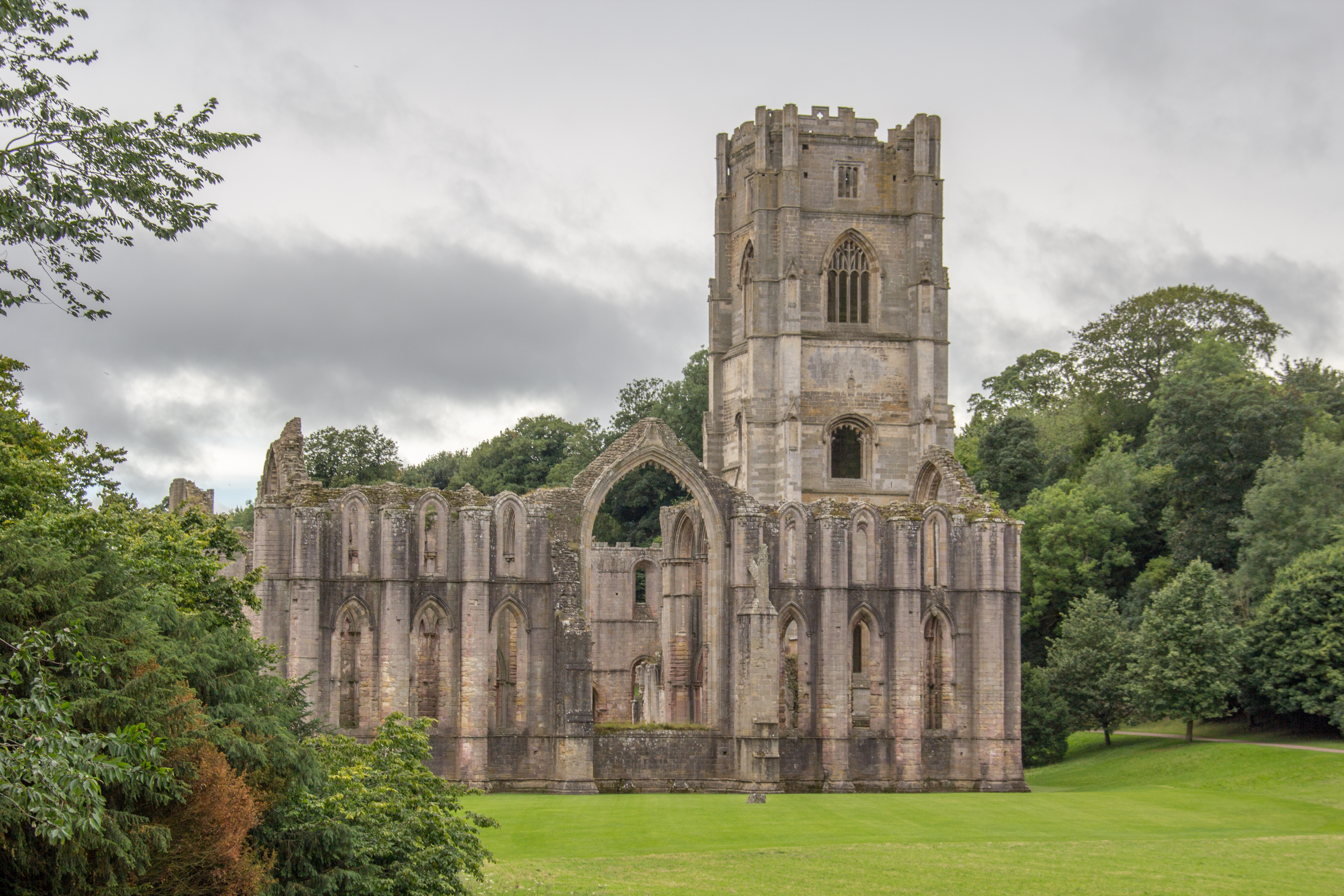
- Fountains Abbey; One of the principal beneficiaries of Matilda's patronage
- Born: c. 1140; Catton
- Died: c. October 1204
- Noble family: Percy
- Spouse: William de Beaumont, 3rd Earl of Warwick
- Father: William de Percy
- Mother: Alice of Tonbridge

Matilda de Percy, Countess of Warwick (died c. October 1204), was a 12th-century noblewoman and heiress. She was the wife of William, earl of Warwick (died 1184) and, in 1174 became a co-heir of her father's large Yorkshire barony with her younger sister Agnes.

== Heiress ==
Matilda was born to the Yorkshire nobleman William II de Percy, lord of Topcliffe and Seamer, son of Alan de Percy. She herself recalls in one of her charters that she was born in the Percy manor of Catton where she was baptised. William was a loyalist in the civil wars of the reign of King Stephen and occupied the office of sheriff of York through most of the reign. He made a prestigious marriage to Alice of Tonbridge, daughter of Richard de Clare. At her father's death in 1174, closely following on that of her brother Alan, Matilda was co-heir to the Percy estate with her sister Agnes. Both women were very attractive marriage prospects and there were complex negotiations between King Henry II, their potential husbands and the ladies themselves as to their fate. This involved an arbitration in 1175 to divide the Percy barony, the text of which survives. From this it appears that Agnes did better, securing a larger number of the lowland Percy manors in the Vale of York, while Matilda had the Percy centres of Tadcaster and Spofforth but more of the less valuable upland estates in Craven. Agnes was married to Joscelin of Louvain and from her is descended the second line of Percy, as her children by Joscelin took Agnes's surname. Matilda's marriage went to Earl William of Warwick from which she acquired only a modest dower, the manor of East Knoyle in Wiltshire.

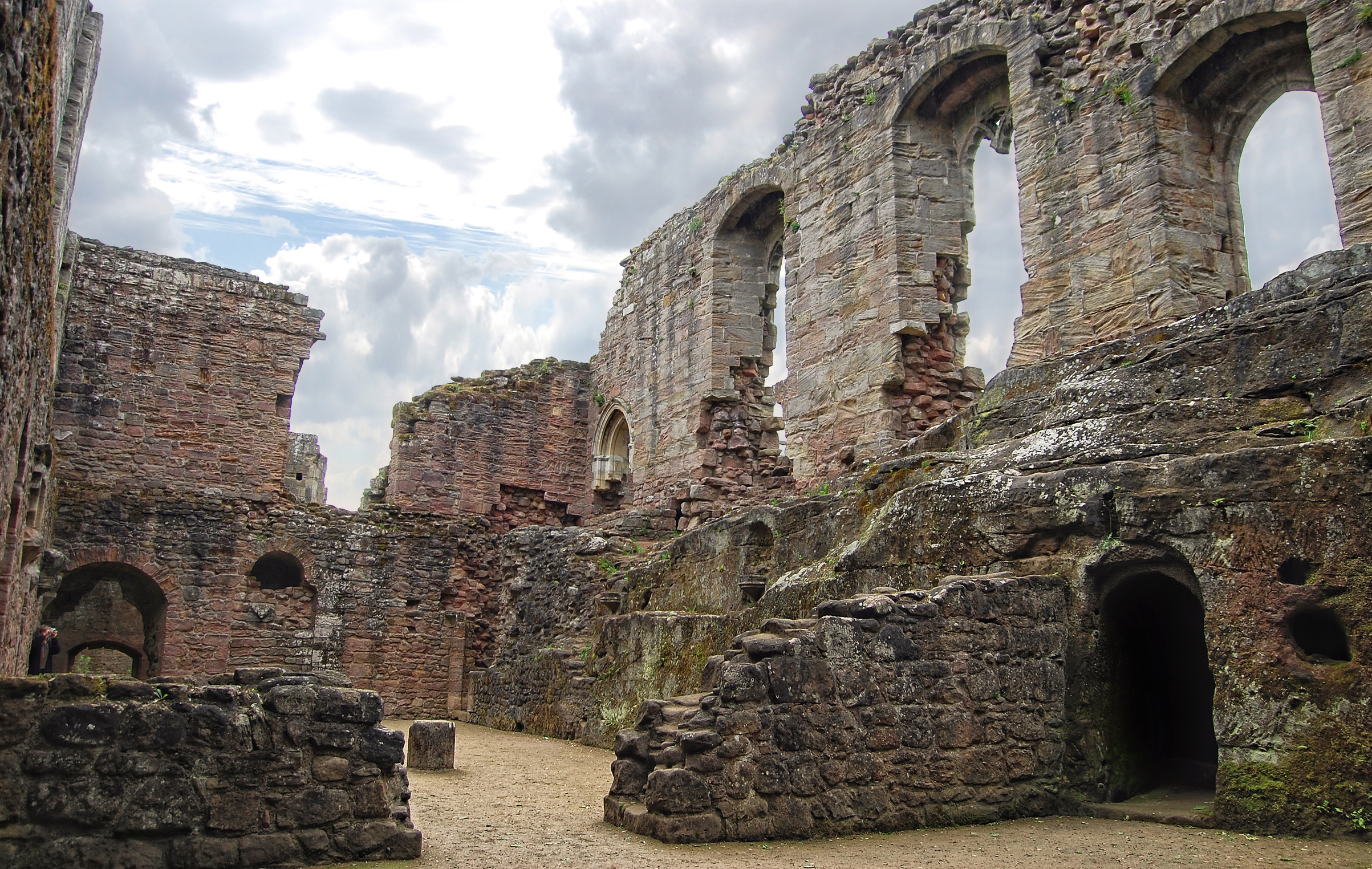
Spofforth, North Yorkshire one of Matilda's castles

== Countess of Warwick ==
One of the features of Matilda's marriage settlement was the unusual one that she retained a degree of personal control of her Percy inheritance. It must have been imposed on Earl William by herself and her advisers, as it was neither in his interest nor the king's that she had it. There are several charters which make Yorkshire grants in her husband's lifetime, notably her endowment before 1181 of her father's poverty-stricken abbey of Sawley in Craven with lands of the former hospital of Tadcaster. Whatever hopes Earl William might have had for the marriage were disappointed on his death in 1184 without issue. Matilda adroitly negotiated a large fine of 700 marks with King Henry II so that she kept control of her inheritance and would not be remarried. She lived on for two decades as an influential and active Northern landowner. In 1189 she was considering founding her own priory of Augustinian canons in the church of Tadcaster, but decided instead to endow it on the monks of Sawley, which was in financial collapse. She generously patronised a number of Yorkshire monasteries, but most especially the Cistercians of Fountains Abbey. In 1199 she stated her intention of being buried in Fountains, though when her death occurred at the end of 1204 she appears to have changed her mind and asked instead to be buried at Sawley abbey, to which the monks of Fountains transferred her burial rights. This and her long-term support for Sawley is likely because her father and other members of her family were buried there. Her lands passed to her nephew Henry de Percy, eldest son of her sister Agnes.

== Sources ==
- Cokayne, George E. (1945), The New Complete Peerage, vol. 12, St. Catherine Press Limited
- The Newburgh Earldom of Warwick and its Charters, 1088–1253 ed. David Crouch and Richard Dace (Dugdale Society, 48, 2015).
- Early Yorkshire Charters, ed. W. Farrer and C. T. Clay (12 vols, YAS Record Series, Extra Series, 1935–65), vol. 11 The Percy Fee.
