= Sawley Abbey =

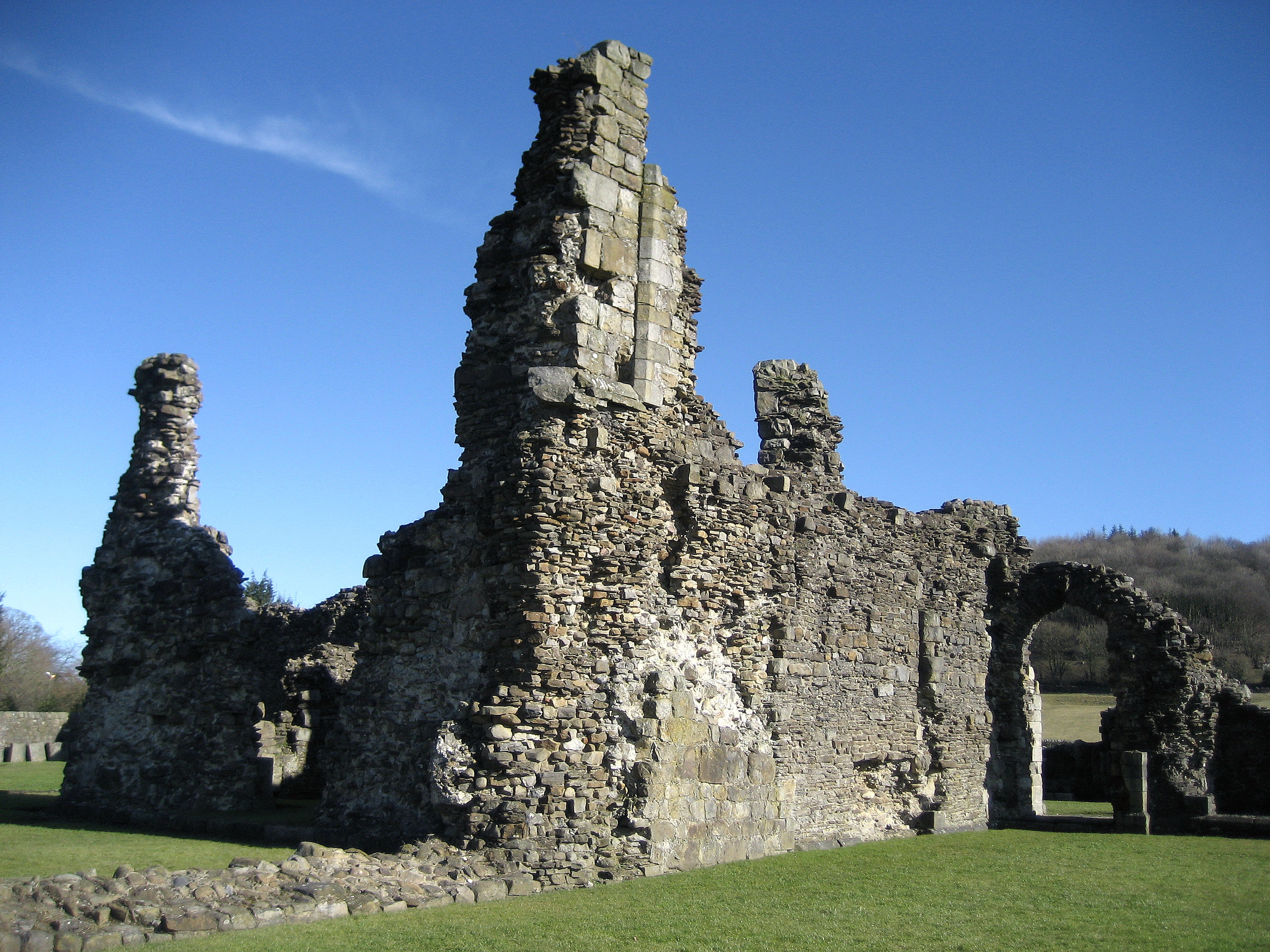
- Sawley Abbey

- Location within the Borough of Ribble Valley Location within the Forest of Bowland
- 53.9134°N 2.3418°W
- Location: Sawley, Lancashire

Listed Building – Grade I
- Official name: Sawley Abbey Ruins
- Designated: 16 November 1954

Scheduled monument
- Official name: Sawley Cistercian abbey and associated earthworks
- Designated: 8 February 1915

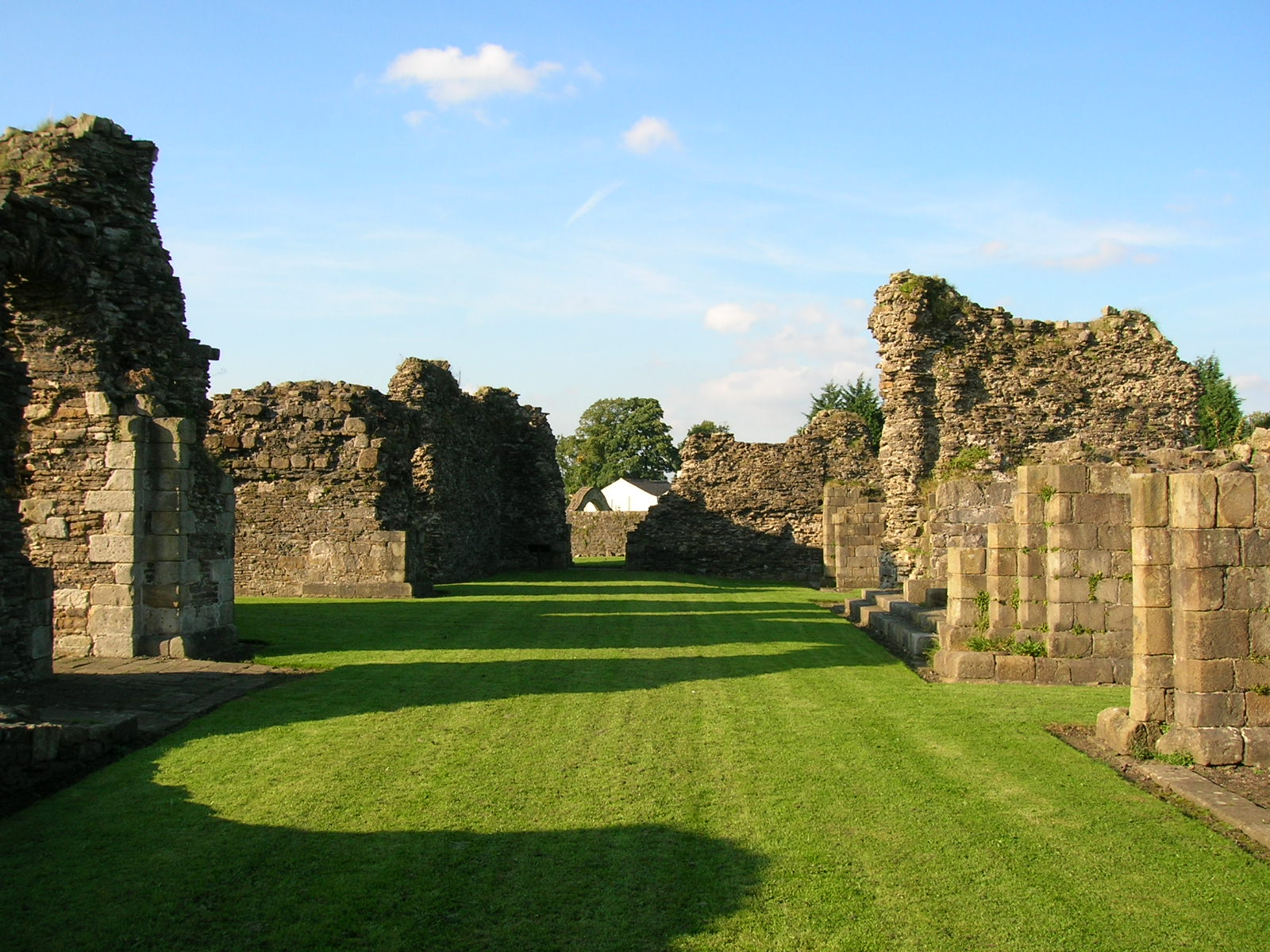
Looking north across the church's transept.

Sawley Abbey was an abbey of Cistercian monks in the village of Sawley, Lancashire, in England (and historically in the West Riding of Yorkshire). Created as a daughter-house of Newminster Abbey, it existed from 1149 until its dissolution in 1536, during the reign of King Henry VIII.

The abbey is a Grade I listed building and Scheduled Ancient Monument. The ruins, which are now controlled by English Heritage, are open to the public. Although not an extensive ruin, there are boards on the site that give information regarding the history of the abbey and its former inhabitants.

== History ==
Created as a daughter-house of Newminster Abbey, itself a daughter of Fountains Abbey. The chief sponsor of the new abbey was William de Percy II, the son of Alan de Percy, feudal baron of Topcliffe, whose family had controlled the land in this part of Craven since Domesday.

In the mid-1140s, Swain, son of Swain, agreed to sell his lease on the site of the new abbey to Abbot Robert of Newminster, also adding a gift of land and wood at Swanside where a fountain (spring) dedicated to St Andrew is mentioned. Percy granted additional lands in the local area for the maintenance of the brethren at Dudland in Gisburn and Ellenthorpe in Paythorne, also confirming gifts from a tenant at Rimington and his steward at Ilkley. Shortly after he augmented this grant, adding Crooks House in Bracewell and Brogden and Stainton in Bank Newton.

Percy had funded the construction of several wooden buildings, and Abbot Benedict along with twelve monks and ten conversi relocated from Newminster, with the abbey officially opening on 6 January 1147–8. Permission to build a fishpond and a mill were confirmed in 1154 by Roger de Pont L'Évêque, Archbishop of York and King Stephen. Pope Alexander III officially took the abbey under his protection in 1172.

William's younger daughter Matilda, the wife of William de Beaumont, 3rd Earl of Warwick gave Tadcaster hospital and land in Catton to the abbey, before the earl's death on crusade in 1184. The abbey struggled to survive with climactic conditions leading to crop failure, and the widowed Matilda was key to the abbey's re-foundation in 1189. She granted to the monks St Mary's Church, Tadcaster with the chapel at Hazlewood Castle, and an annual pension from the chapel at Newton Kyme, more land at Catton, along with grazing rights and the right to take timber at Gisburn Forest. By 1211, her grandnephew William de Percy, 6th Baron Percy donated the manor of Gisburn Forest, and Gisburn manor in 1245.

Around same time, Elias De Giggleswicke presented—along with his body for burial—the manors of Stainforth and Langcliffe to the Abbey. This included a corn mill at Langcliffe.

In 1296, the move of the Cistercian monks from Stanlow Abbey to nearby Whalley caused consternation at Sawley. The monks here complained that they had both lost some of their income and that the cost of food and building materials had increased in the face of the extra demand. Even the hope that Whalley would develop a large tannery had caused the local sellers of tree bark to rise their prices to such an extent that Sawley's tanning operation was nearly destroyed. In 1305, at the general chapter of the Cistercian order, the dispute was settled with a command that Whalley should sell any excess produce to Sawley at market rates, and should either abbey's members transgress against the other, those people would be sent to the opposing abbey for punishment. In September 1306, Archbishop William Greenfield excommunicated the abbot, John de Houeden, along with most of the senior monks and they were not absolved for seven years. The reason for this is no longer known. Around this time the Sawley community were further impoverished by attacks of Scots raiding parties, who looted and burnt some of their property, prompting Henry de Percy, 1st Baron Percy of Alnwick to give the church of St. Andrew at Gargrave in 1313.

Despite being a relatively poor establishment, a scholarly tradition developed at the abbey. The abbot from 1224 to 1233, Stephen of Sawley, was a well respected spiritual writer, and William de Remmyngton went on to become Chancellor of the University of Oxford in 1372–3. An English translation of a Latin work by the 13th-century, scholar-bishop Robert Grosseteste is also thought to have originated here.

=== Dissolution ===
With an annual revenue below £200 (the equivalent of £143,000 as of 2025 (Note: UK Consumer Price Index inflation figures from 1209–2024 based on data from "Inflation calculator". Bank of England. London. 18 February 2026.)), Sawley was included in the initial group of monasteries ordered to be suppressed by King Henry VIII in 1536, during the dissolution of the monasteries. As a wave of uprisings spread across the country that would become known as the Pilgrimage of Grace, on 12 October, supported by the rebels, the monks returned to the empty abbey. They petitioned Sir Thomas Percy for aid, and received it from Sir Stephen Hamerton and Nicholas Tempest, who were able to persuade the Abbot of Whalley to support the cause. When news arrived that the Earl of Derby had been ordered to attack Sawley, the rebels were able to muster sufficient men to block the earl's advance from Preston at the end of the month. Robert Aske sent word of the results of his negotiation with the Duke of Norfolk at Doncaster and both sides disbanded without battle. The period of relative calm that followed was broken by Bigod's rebellion in January 1537, and it soon became clear that any hope of saving the abbey was lost. When the Duke of Norfolk arrived on 9 February, he found the abbey deserted. The monks had surrendered the building to Sir Richard Tempest, who then turned it over to Sir Arthur Darcy, who took the abbot prisoner.

Although all agree that the last abbot was executed as punishment for his actions, there is disagreement as to both the place of execution and the identity of the office-holder. Thomas Bolton had been abbot for almost 10 years at the start of 1536. Many sources assert that Bolton was replaced by William Trafford just before the dissolution, and some that Trafford was executed in Lancaster on 10 March 1537 alongside John Paslew, the last Abbot of Whalley. It is possible that Bolton was executed and the addition of William Trafford to the list of abbots was an error made by John Stevens in the early 18th century and uncritically repeated by some authors ever since. Sirs Thomas Percy and Stephen Hamerton, Nicholas Tempest, and Robert Aske were among those tried in London and sent to the gallows at Tyburn in late May and early June.

=== Post-dissolution ===
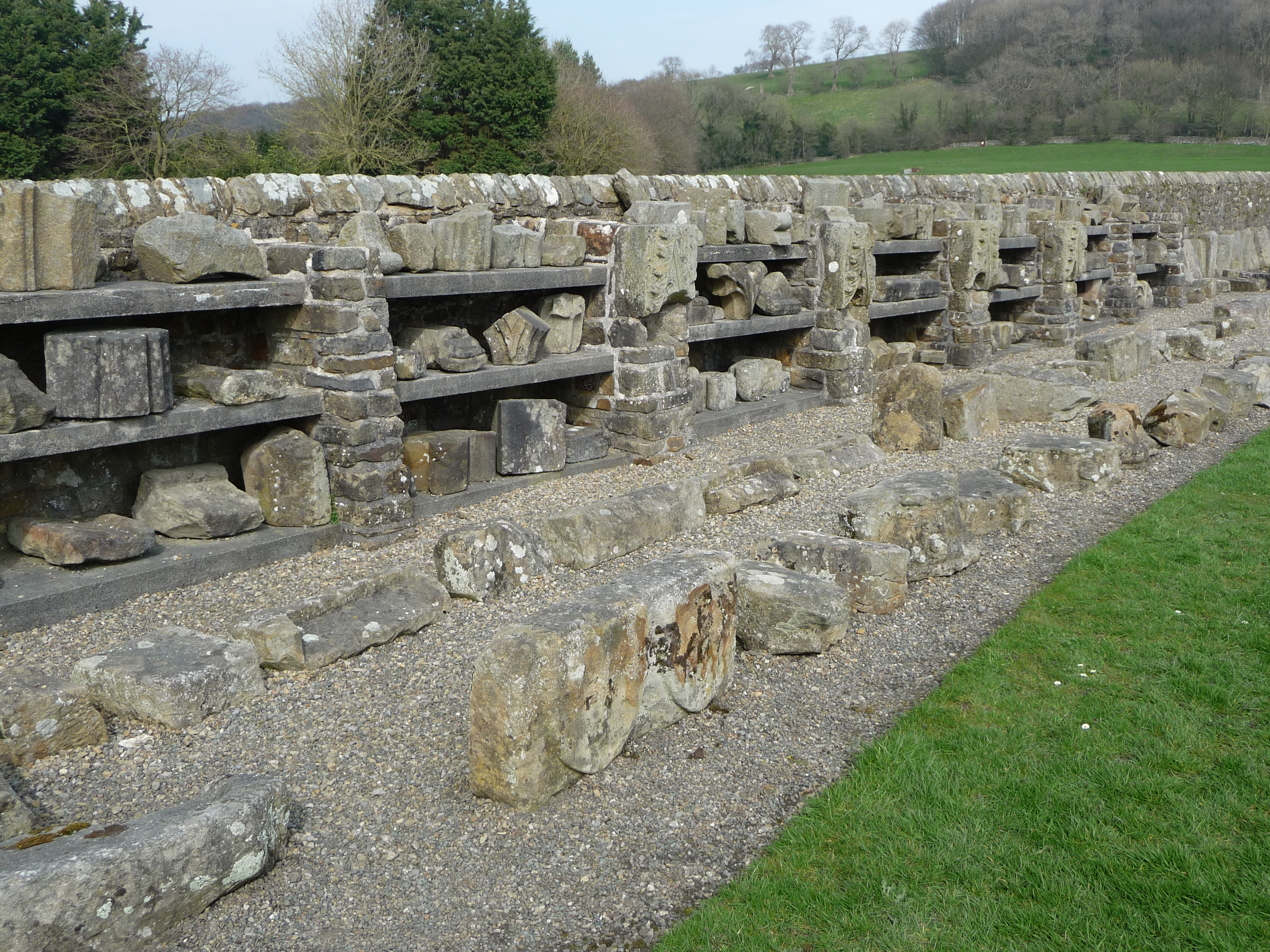
A display of stones found around the site.

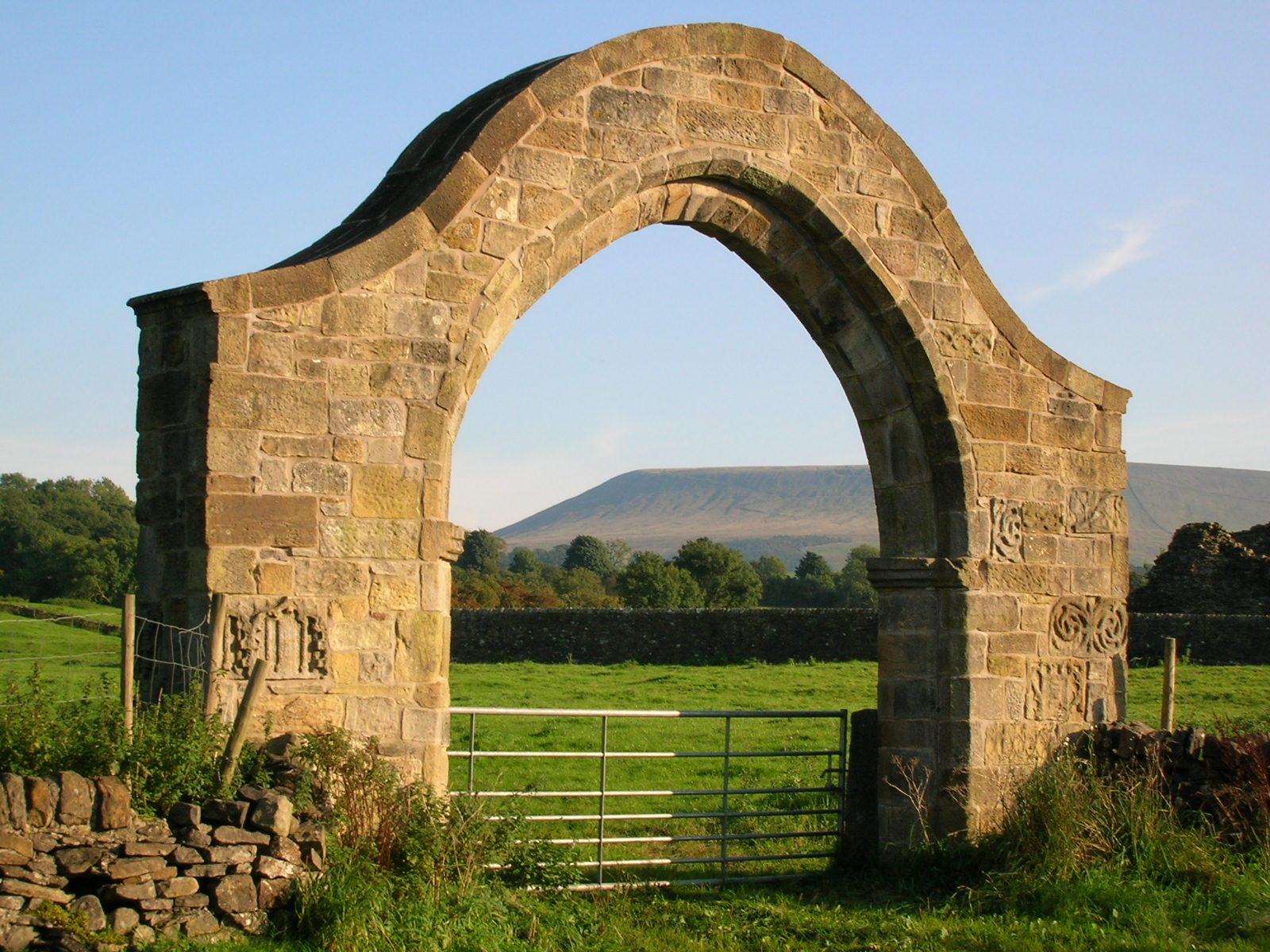
A gateway reconstructed in 1962.

Arthur Darcy acquired the abbey and wrote to Thomas Cromwell about his search for one the abbey's chalices and financial records. By 1561 the abbey site was among the former monastic lands owned by Henry Darcy, the son of Sir Arthur Darcy. Parts of the northern end of the west range may have been incorporated into a house which was still standing around 1850. An isolated wall containing a fireplace, which survives to a height of 6 metres (20 ft), could have been reused in the post-medieval building. Elements of the abbey have been also incorporated into other buildings including carvings on the chancel screen at All Hallows Church, Great Mitton, a two-storey bay window at Little Mearley Hall, Mearley, along with decorated stonework at Middop Hall, Middop, and at Southport Farmhouse, Sawley.

Sawley manor had come into the possession of James Hay when he was created Lord Hay of Sawley in 1615, and it was inherited by his son. It passed through several generations of the Greville family, until in 1753, when Fulke Grenville sold Sawley to William Weddell of Newby Hall. Upon his death in 1792 it passed to Weddell's distant cousin, Thomas de Grey, 2nd Earl de Grey who was still the site's owner in 1848. By this time much of the abbey's remains were hidden beneath mounds of rubbish and soil. Earl de Grey had much of the site cleared under the direction of John R Walbran, assisted by local unemployed men. They revealed the floor of the church and chapter house, uncovering six gravestones. The house must also have been demolished around this time, (Note: A sizeable building is marked on the six inch Ordnance Survey map surveyed in 1847, but is not mentioned by Harland in 1853.) and the wall that encloses the site today must have been constructed some time after.

At the roadside 100 metres (330 ft) north of the church is an archway containing a considerable quantity of decorated medieval stonework. It was reconstructed in 1962 from stone taken from a nearby demolished gateway, one of two constructed over the road around 1848 for Earl de Grey, using stones removed from the abbey site.

Ownership followed the de Gray Earldom to George Robinson, 1st Marquess of Ripon, who was in possession by 1878. In 1934, the Sawley estate was purchased by John E Fattorini of Bradford for £81,285 (the equivalent of £5.03 million as of 2025). In 1951 the area of the monastery passed into the guardianship of the Secretary of State.

In March 2009, Sawley Abbey was featured in the first episode of series 3 of the TV series The Tudors.

== Layout ==
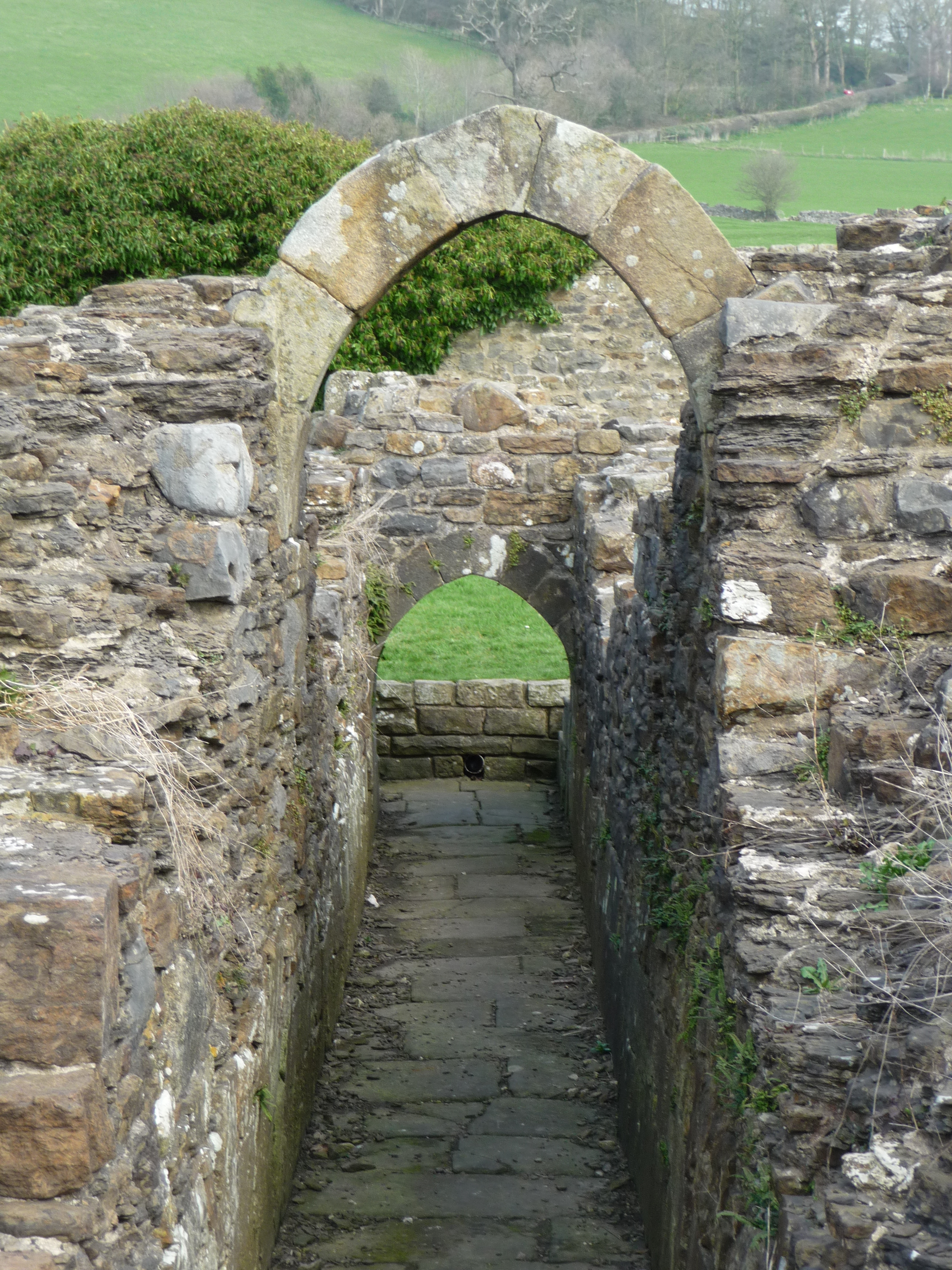
The remains of monks' latrine.

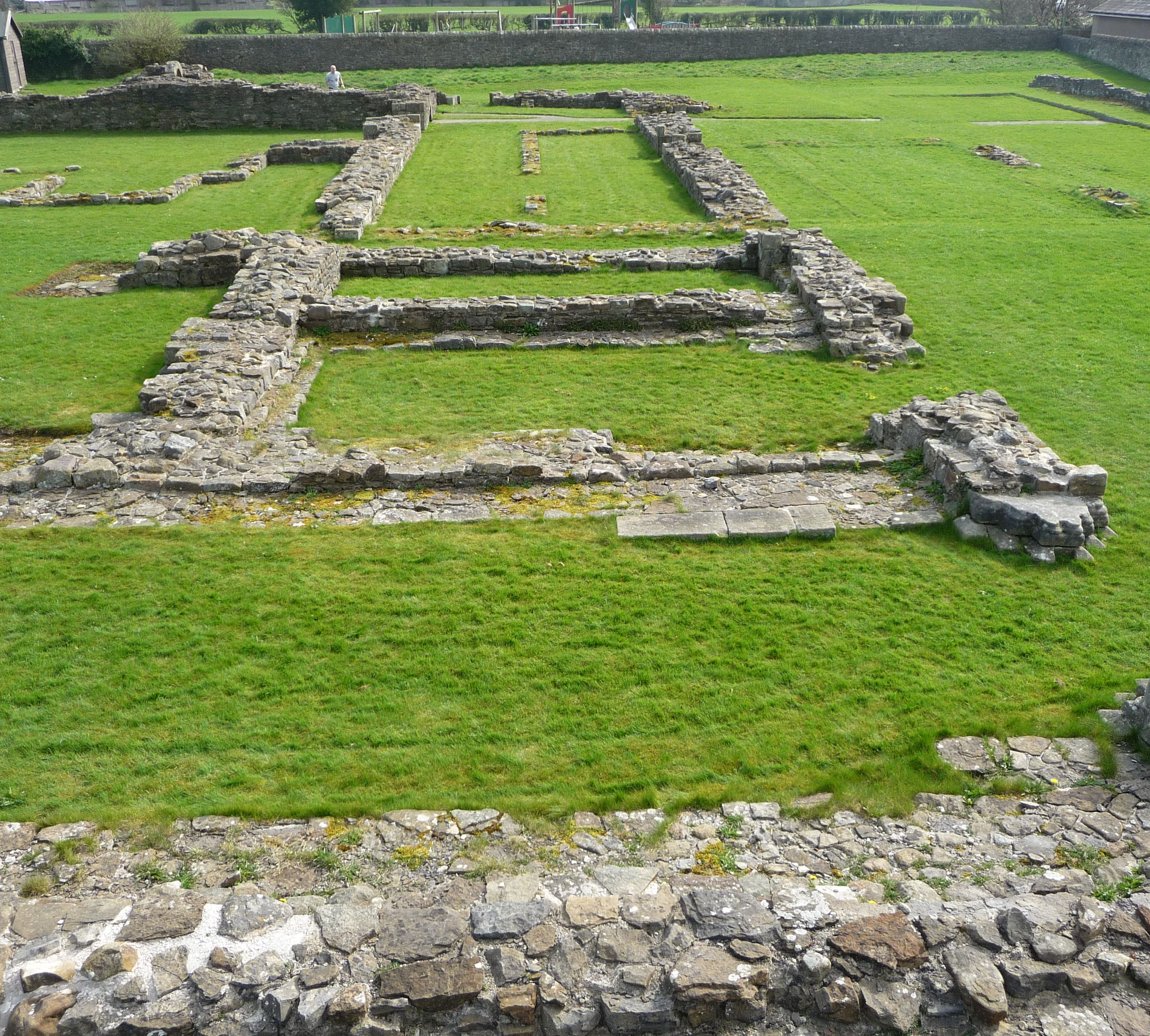
Much of the remains survive as low walls.

The core of the abbey consisted of a four-sided complex built around a courtyard measuring 37 by 28 metres (121 by 92 ft), known as the cloister. The entire abbey site was in an enclosed religious precinct covering 16.2 hectares (40 acres) and surrounded by a ditch and earthen bank, possibly topped with a stone wall. The entrances to the precinct seem to have been located near the south-east and north-west corners, where gatehouses were presumably located. The inner court appears to have been located on the south and east sides of the cloister, with the outer court on west and north sides.

The church was aligned east–west and formed the northern range of the cloister. The transept is 38 by 12 metres (125 by 40 ft) and both the north and south sides have three chapels along the eastern wall. On the northern side the is an exterior doorway and on the southern an entrance to the night stairs, which provided access from the monks' quarters. The original nave measured approximately 40 metres (130 ft) in length and a narrow chapel was added along its north side in the 14th century. It was shortened around the turn of the 16th century to become a mere 9.1 by 12.2 metres (30 by 40 ft), with the chancel lengthened and widened to 35 by 19 metres (116 by 62 ft), at around the same time. The most visible remains today are the ruins of the church, which still retains walls standing up to 8 metres (26 ft) high.

The east range consisted of two floors with the monks' dorter (sleeping quarters) on the upper floor with an area of 313.6 square metres (3,376 sq ft). The ground floor contained a small sacristy, accessed from the church, for storage of sacred vessels, next to a library with access from the cloister. The chapter house extended beyond the range on the east, providing an undivided space measuring 14.78 by 7.05 metres (48.5 ft × 23.1 ft). The parlour was between the chapter house and the day stairs to the dormitory. At the close of the 12th century, this stairway was superseded by another in the south range and removed. The space modified to provide access from the parlour, possibly becoming a treasury or strong room. A transverse passageway separated the undercroft of the monks' dorter. Extending eastwards from the southern end of the range was a latrine block. At around the same time as the stairway modification, the south wall of the range was demolished, and building extended by 3.8 metres (12 ft).

The calefactory (warming house), refectory and kitchen formed the south range. The warming house had a fireplace against the west wall and an external yard adjoining it to the south possibly used as a firewood store. Located next to the day stair, it may have had a second floor used to store muniments. The refectory was 9.3 by 30.8 metres (31 by 101 ft), extending well south of the other buildings in the range. The kitchen was 12.25 by 8.80 metres (40.2 by 28.9 ft) also with an external yard.

The west range was originally housed the lay-brothers and included their sleeping quarters, dining hall and cellars, but was latterly partly converted into the abbot's lodgings. Abbey Cottage, adjoining the road on the western side of the site, is thought to contain walls that were originally part of the abbey's western range. A drain with some transverse arches and a piscina have been incorporated into its porch.

Surrounding the abbey except on the west are many earthworks indicating the sites of structures such as the infirmary, infirmarer's house (keeper of the infirmary), bakery, and brewery along with other buildings, enclosures, gardens, stock pens, and watercourses. The abbey corn mill was located to the south-west of the abbey, near the River Ribble. The leat runs north–south along the base of the hill, cutting a bend in the river. The water supply was augmented via an additional channel from St Mary's Well situated to the north-east of the abbey.

== Books ==
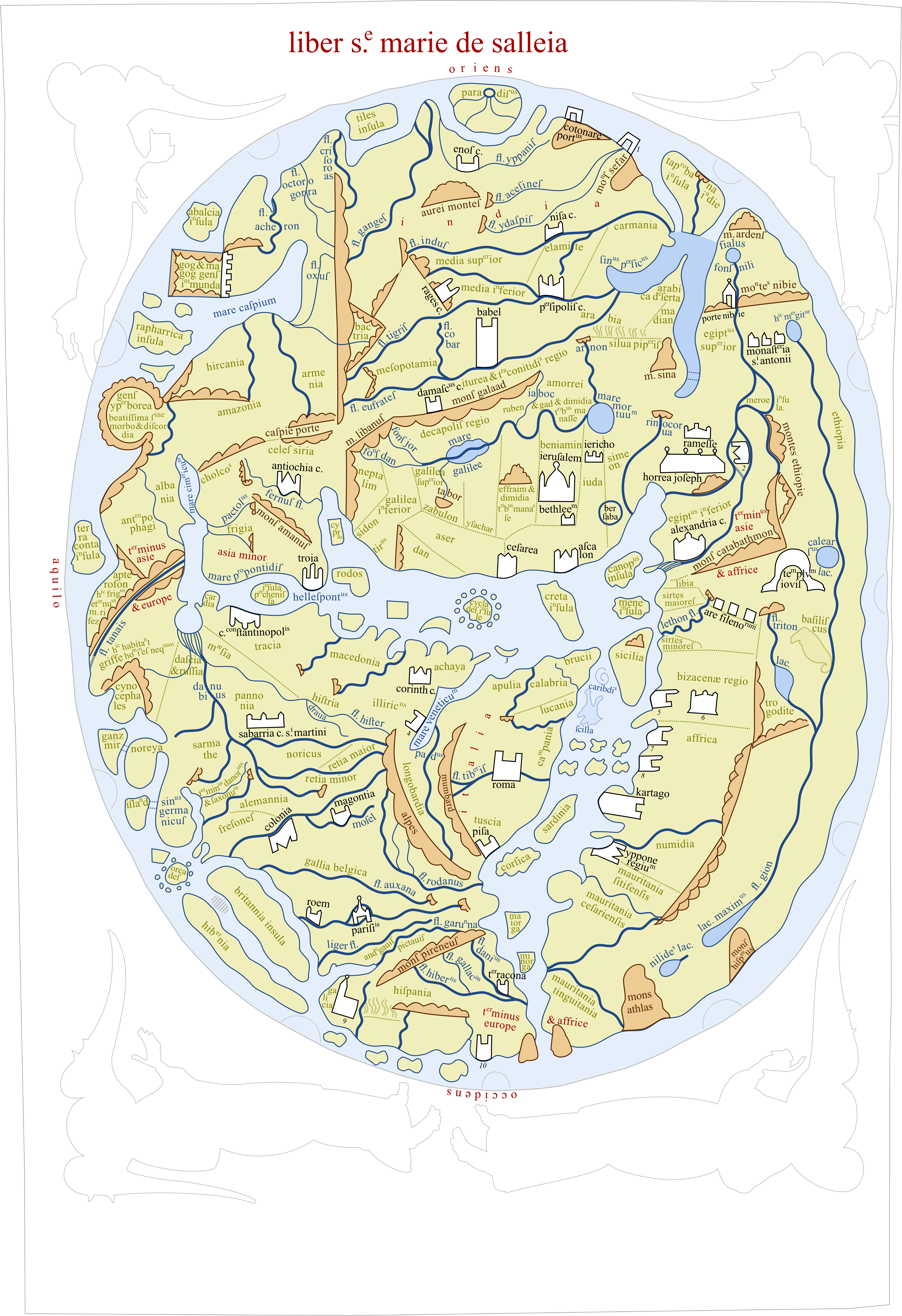
A modern recreation of the Sawley Mappa Mundi. East is at the top, with perhaps a stylised Dome of the Rock denoting Jerusalem, just above centre right

Only three books thought to have been in the abbey's library are known to still exist, with two of those now at Cambridge University. Both manuscripts were acquired by Archbishop Matthew Parker and either gifted to the University Library in 1574, or bequeathed to Corpus Christi College after his death in 1575. The first is now in two parts, Cambridge University Library, Ff. i.27 and Cambridge, Corpus Christi College, MS 66. It contains the earliest known English example of a group of similar world maps that includes the Hereford Mappa Mundi. Traditionally known as the Henry of Mainz Map, it is thought to have been created in the late 12th or early 13th century, perhaps at Durham Priory. It is now known as the Sawley map. The second manuscript is Cambridge, Corpus Christi College, MS 139, thought to have been written around 1164.

The abbey's cartulary is part of the Harleian Collection at the British Library (Harley MS 112).

== Burials ==
- William de Percy, 6th Baron Percy and wife Ellen de Balliol (daughter of Ingram de Balliol).
- Henry de Percy, 7th Baron Percy (1228–1272) and wife Eleanor de Warenne Percy (daughter of John de Warenne, 6th Earl of Surrey).
- Robert de Cliderhou, Parson of Wigan.
- William de Remmyngton.

== See also ==
- Grade I listed buildings in Lancashire
- Listed buildings in Sawley, Lancashire
- List of English Heritage properties
- List of monastic houses in Lancashire
- Scheduled monuments in Lancashire
