= Wigglesworth =

Village and civil parish in North Yorkshire, England

Coordinates: 54°00′29″N 2°17′29″W

- Village and civil parish
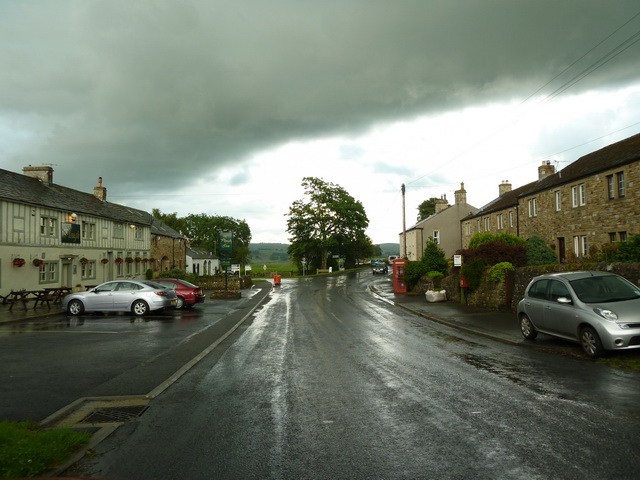
- Main street with public house to the left

- Location within North Yorkshire
- Population: 379 (Including Halton West. 2011 census)
- OS grid reference: SD809569
- Unitary authority: North Yorkshire
- Ceremonial county: North Yorkshire
- Region: Yorkshire and the Humber
- Country: England
- Sovereign state: United Kingdom
- Post town: Skipton
- Postcode district: BD23
- Police: North Yorkshire
- Fire: North Yorkshire
- Ambulance: Yorkshire

Wigglesworth is a village and civil parish in North Yorkshire, England. The population of the civil parish taken at the 2011 Census was 379. It is on the road between Long Preston to the east and Slaidburn to the west. The small village of Rathmell lies 2 miles (3 km) to the north. It is about 5 miles (8 km) south of Settle.

Despite the small size of the village, it has a public house called the Plough Inn. Wigglesworth consists of a few small scattered houses and farmsteads.

A former Wesleyan chapel stands on the B6478 road in the western part of the settlement.

Until 1974 it was part of the West Riding of Yorkshire. From 1974 to 2023 it was part of the Craven District, it is now administered by the unitary North Yorkshire Council.

The name Wigglesworth derives from the Old English Wincelsworð meaning 'Wincel's enclosure'.

== See also ==
- Listed buildings in Wigglesworth
