= Robert Redmayne Parker =

English ceremonial officer

Robert Parker

Bowbearer of the Forest of Bowland
- Incumbent
- Assumed office 2010
- Monarchs: Elizabeth II (2010-2022); Charles III (2022-present)
- Preceded by: Richard Eastwood

Personal details
- Born: 1954 (age 71–72)
- Spouse: Amanda Jane Backhouse (m.1985)
- Children: 2
- Parent(s): Edmund Christopher Parker; Diana Elizabeth Marriott
- Relatives: William Marriott (grandfather)
- Occupation: rural business advisor, land manager, ceremonial officer

Robert Redmayne Parker (born 1954) is a British rural business adviser, land manager, and ceremonial officer. He worked with the Ministry of Agriculture, Fisheries and Food, prior to its merger into the Department for Environment, Food and Rural Affairs, and for the Country Land and Business Association. Since 1975, he has been the owner of Browsholme Hall, his family seat in Bowland Forest Low. In 2010, Parker was appointed as Bowbearer of the Forest of Bowland by William Bowland, 16th Lord of Bowland, becoming the first bowbearer of Bowland in almost one hundred and fifty years.

== Early life ==
Parker was born in 1954 to Edmund Christopher Parker and Diana Elizabeth Marriott. Through his father, he is a member of the landed gentry, descending from a branch of the Parker family that once owned Alkincoats Hall. His mother was the former governor of Addenbrooke’s Hospital and secretary to the Earl of Cranbrook. Parker's maternal grandfather was William Marriott, the Swiss-born engineer and railway superintendent who founded the North Norfolk Railway. He has two half siblings, Simon and Carolina, from his mother's first marriage to Captain John Swynfen Jervis.

Parker inherited Browsholme Hall, his family seat, in 1975 after the death of his fourth cousin once removed and godfather, Colonel Robert Goulbourne Parker.

== Career ==
Parker has worked for the Ministry of Agriculture, Fisheries and Food (United Kingdom) and the Country Land and Business Association as a rural business advisor.

== Bowbearer of Bowland ==
In 2010, William Bowland, Lord of Bowland appointed Parker as the Bowbearer of the Forest of Bowland, an ancient ceremonial title of an attendant who, by tradition, accompanies the Lord of Bowland (also known as the Lord of the Fells) during hunts and serves as an officer in the Lord's forest courts. Parker was the first Bowbearer of Bowland to be appointed in nearly one hundred and fifty years. Parker's ancestors had claimed the office as a hereditary right, with successive generations holding the title between the 17th and 18th centuries.

In April 2011, Bowland accompanied the 16th Lord of Bowland, along with other representatives from the Bowland Higher Division Parish Council, the Forest authorities, and community leaders and dignitaries, on an official visit to the village of Dunsop Bridge.

In October 2012, Parker was formally presented with his Bowbearer's "wand of office" by Lord of Bowland at a public ceremony in Slaidburn. This ceremony marked the 90th anniversary of the final meeting of the manorial court at the town's Tudor courthouse.

== Personal life ==
Parker married Amanda Jane Backhouse in 1985. His wife served as High Sheriff of Lancashire in 2015. They have two children.

In 2010, he and his wife restored the estate's 17th-century tithe barn for use as an event space.
