= Listed buildings in Bowland Forest High =

Bowland Forest High is a civil parish in Ribble Valley, Lancashire, England. It contains nine listed buildings that are recorded in the National Heritage List for England. All of the listed buildings are designated at Grade II, the lowest of the three grades, which is applied to "buildings of national importance and special interest". The parish contains the village of Dunsop Bridge, and otherwise consists of farmland and moorland. The listed buildings consist of houses, a bridge, a milestone, a boundary stone and a telephone kiosk.

== Buildings ==
Name and location	Photograph	Date	Notes
Hareden Cottage; 53.94909°N 2.54755°W	—	Late 17th century	The house is in sandstone with a slate roof, in two storeys, and with a rear outshut. The windows are mullioned, and the doorway has a chamfered surround and a triangular head. On the front is a first floor door reached by external steps.
Hareden Farmhouse; 53.94919°N 2.54905°W	—	1690	A farmhouse in sandstone with a slate roof in two storeys and three bays. The windows in the left bay are sashes, and elsewhere they are mullioned. The doorway has moulded jambs, the moulding carried around a shaped lintel.
Milestone; 53.94478°N 2.52330°W		1739	The milestone is in sandstone and has a rectangular plan and a shaped top. It is inscribed with the distances in miles, on one face to Lancaster and to Clitheroe (both in archaic spelling), and on the other face to Slaidburn and to Hornby.
House near Beatrix Farmhouse; 53.95719°N 2.51319°W	—	Late 18th century	A sandstone house with a slate roof in two storeys and two bays. There is a gabled porch with quoins. In the gable is a window and a niche containing a cast iron picture of a sheep. Most of the windows are mullioned, and the doorway has a plain surround. At the rear is a stair window with transoms.
Dunsop Bridge; 53.94577°N 2.52009°W		c.1800	The bridge carries a road over the River Dunsop. It is in sandstone, and consists of a single segmental arch with a string course and a solid rounded parapet.
Rose Cottage and farm building 53.95836°N 2.56551°W	—	c.1800 (probable)	The house and farm building are in sandstone with a blue slate roof and are in two storeys. The house has three bays, mullioned windows, and a doorway with a plain surround. The farm building to the left has a wide entrance and a pitching hole above.
St Hubert's Church; 53.94702°N 2.52863°W		1864–65	A Roman Catholic church designed by E. W. Pugin with James Murray in Early English style, it is in sandstone with slate roofs. The church consists of a nave, a northwest porch, a sanctuary with a semicircular apse, and a south sacristy. At the west end is a bellcote, at the east end is a cross finial, and the windows are lancets. The boundary wall, the gate piers and the timber lychgate with a hipped roof are included in the listing.
Grey Stone of Trough boundary stone 53.97199°N 2.57739°W		1897	The stone marks the boundary between Lancashire and Yorkshire. It is in sandstone and has a triangular section. It is inscribed with the names of the counties, and the distances in miles to Whitewell and Clitheroe on one side and to Lancaster and Bay Horse on the other.
KX100 Kiosk; 53.94574°N 2.51843°W		1992	The telephone kiosk is of the KX100 (Mark 2) type. It has a square plan and a flat roof, and an aluminium frame clad in stainless panels with aluminium edging. On three sides are panels of toughened glass, and the door has a panel in burgundy red and a plastic handle. The kiosk carries an inscription stating “100,000th public payphone/ Dunsop Bridge/ at the centre of Britain”, surrounded by the names of British cities.
