= Thomas Lister Parker =

British antiquarian

Thomas Lister Parker FRS FSA
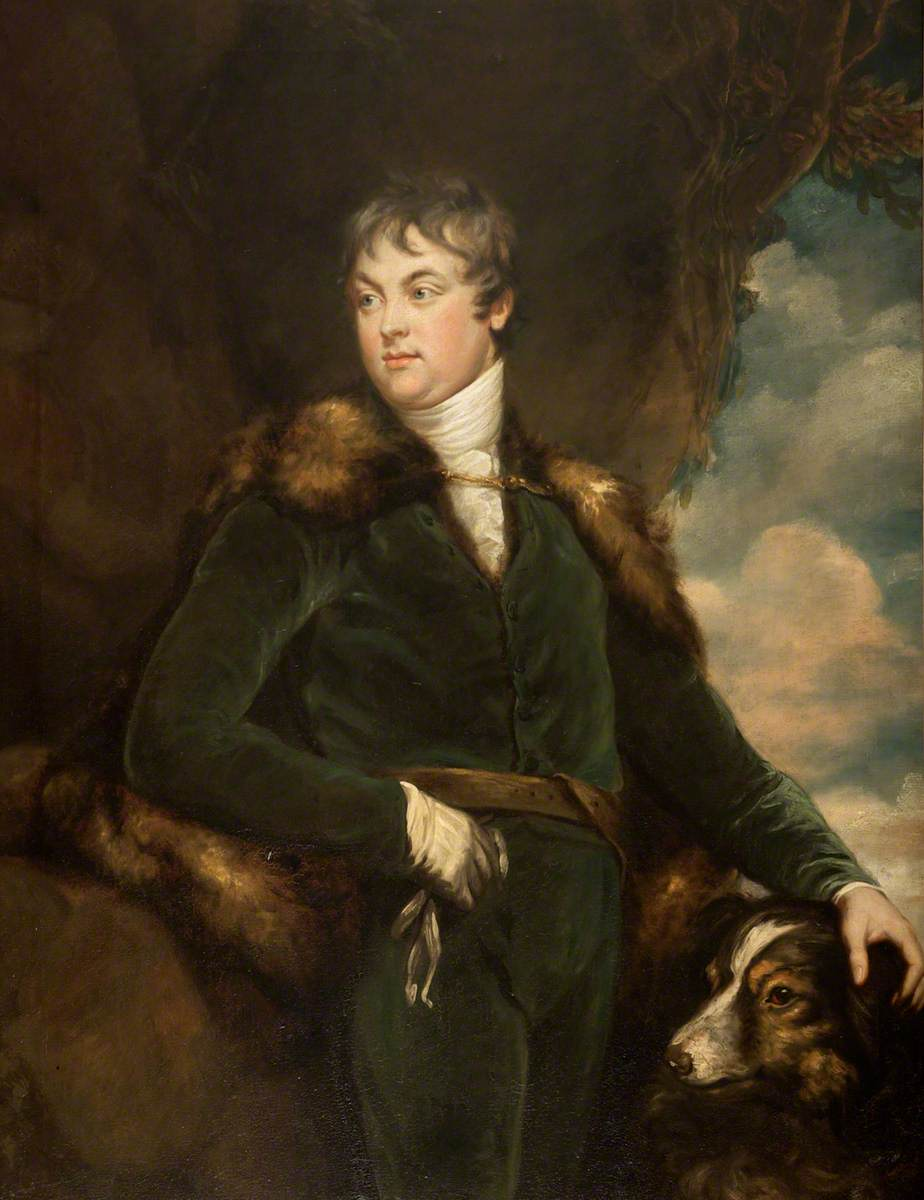
- Portrait of Thomas Lister Parker by James Northcote
- Born: 27 September 1779; Browsholme Hall, Yorkshire
- Died: 2 March 1858 (aged 78); Deansgate, Manchester
- Education: Clitheroe Royal Grammar School
- Relatives: John Parker (father); John W. R. Parker (cousin)

Thomas Lister Parker FSA FRS (27 September 1779 – 2 March 1858) was an English antiquary, landowner, Trumpeter to the Queen and Honorary Bowbearer of the Forest of Bowland, Lancashire.

== Life ==
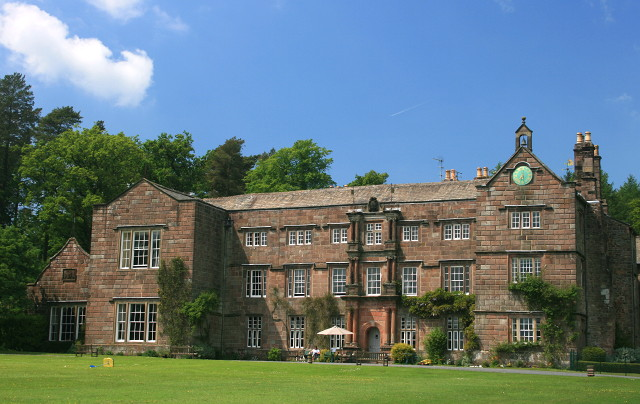
Browsholme Hall.

Born at Browsholme Hall, Yorkshire (now in Lancashire), England on 27 September 1779, he was the eldest of the eight sons of John Parker of Browsholme, by his wife Beatrix, daughter of Thomas Lister (1723–61) of Gisburne Park, then in Yorkshire (but now in Lancashire) and sister of Thomas Lister, 1st Lord Ribblesdale. He was educated at the Clitheroe Royal Grammar School under Thomas Wilson.

On the death of his father on 25 May 1797, Parker succeeded to the Browsholme estate. In 1804 and 1805 he made alterations to the sixteenth century Browsholme Hall, rebuilding the west wing, and afterwards he made additions under the superintendence of Sir Jeffrey Wyatville. Parker had a taste for landscape gardening, and between 1797 and 1810 spent large sums in laying out his grounds. In the house he displayed a collection of antiquities and pictures, partly formed by himself. He had a large series of drawings and prints bought during a tour on the continent in 1800 and 1801, in Moscow, Venice, and Paris; a large collection of drawings of castles and manor-houses by John Chessell Buckler, and portfolios of his own drawings. He also owned pictures of the Flemish school and works of James Northcote and Thomas Gainsborough.

Parker was elected Fellow of the Society of Antiquaries in 1801, and afterwards Fellow of the Royal Society. He was High Sheriff of Lancashire in 1804. He had the sinecure post of "Trumpeter to the Queen", and also claimed the office, as hereditary in his family for many generations, of "Bowbearer of the Forest of Bowland".

A liberal patron of artists, Parker's expenditure brought him into difficulties in the latter part of his life. In 1820 he sold Browsholme estate, with the mansion, to his cousin, Thomas Parker of Alkincoats Hall, Colne, Lancashire, who, dying without issue in 1832, left it to his nephew, Thomas Goulbourne Parker (1818–1879).

Parker retired from society, and lived at the Star Inn in Deansgate, Manchester, where he died, unmarried, on 2 March 1858. He was buried on 9 March in his family chapel in Waddington Church, Yorkshire.

== Works ==
In 1815 Parker published a Description of Browsholme Hall … and of the Parish of Waddington. The volume included a collection of letters of the reigns of Charles I, Charles II, and James II, printed from the originals at Browsholme. The frontispiece gives a view of the exterior of the hall in 1750.

The views of Browsholme in Thomas Dunham Whitaker's Parish of Whalley were prepared at Parker's expense, one of them, signed "Wm. Turner A.", being by J. M. W. Turner. Parker was an associate of Whitaker, who used his antiquarian and genealogical manuscripts for his Whalley. He was also a friend of Charles Towneley, the Hebers, Turner, and James Northcote. Some of his letters are printed in Francis Robert Raines's Life of Wilson of Clitheroe, 1858.

Honorary titles
Preceded by Isaac Blackburne	High Sheriff of Lancashire; 1804–5	Succeeded by Meyrick Holme Bankes
Preceded by John Parker	Bowbearer of the Forest of Bowland; 1797–1858	Succeeded by Thomas Parker
