= Listed buildings in Bowland Forest Low =

Bowland Forest Low is a civil parish in Ribble Valley, Lancashire, England. It contains 28 listed buildings that are recorded in the National Heritage List for England. Of these, one is listed at Grade I, the highest of the three grades, one is at Grade II*, the middle grade and the others are at Grade II, the lowest grade. The parish contains the settlements of Whitewell and Cow Ark, and is otherwise almost completely rural. The most important building in the parish is Browsholme Hall; this and a number of associated structures are listed. Most of the other listed buildings are houses and associated structures, farmhouses, and farm buildings. The River Hodder passes along the boundary of the parish, and two bridges crossing it are listed. Also listed are a church, a folly, a former smithy, a limekiln, and a hotel.

== Key ==
Grade	Criteria
I	Buildings of exceptional interest, sometimes considered to be internationally important
II*	Particularly important buildings of more than special interest
II	Buildings of national importance and special interest

== Buildings ==
Name and location	Photograph	Date	Notes	Grade
Browsholme Hall; 53.90241°N 2.48202°W		Early 17th century	A country house in sandstone with a slate roof. It has an H-shaped plan consisting of a main range and cross wings. The east wing was built in the early 18th century, and the west wing was rebuilt in 1805. The six-bay main range and east wing have three storeys, and the west wing has two storeys. The windows are mullioned and contain sashes. On the front is a three-storey portico that has a doorway with a moulded surround and a semicircular head, and a plain parapet. In the east gable is a clock, and on its apex is a bellcote.	I
Stakes; 53.88798°N 2.53943°W		Early 17th century	A stone house with a slate roof, in two storeys, with a T-shaped plan, and with a west front of five bays. The windows are of various types; some are mullioned, others are mullioned and transomed, and there are also sash windows and cross windows. There is a doorway with moulding that continues around a shaped lintel, and a plaque with a Latin inscription (roughly translating as "MY CITIZENS REMEMBER MY BIRTH NOT NOW BUT AFTERWARDS").	II*
Sundial, Browsholme Hall; 53.90199°N 2.48161°W	—	17th century	The sundial is in sandstone, and is octagonal on a square base. The shaft consists of two pieces of stone, each with four decorated bosses. There is an inscription on the upper stone. The top is moulded and has a brass plate.	II
Browsholme Farmhouse; 53.90183°N 2.48310°W	—	17th century	A sandstone house with s stone-slate roof in two storeys. Most of the windows are mullioned, and the porch has a doorway with a moulded surround, above which is a plaque with a carved deer, and coping with a ball finial. To the right is a one-bay outshut, and to the left is a one-bay wing with a mullioned and transomed window and an inscribed plaque.	II
Pair of houses and barn, Browsholme Hall; 53.90162°N 2.48269°W	—	Late 17th century	The houses and barn are in sandstone. The houses have a stone-slate roof, and are in two storeys and five bays. The windows are mullioned. There are two doorways with moulded surrounds, one of which also has a shaped inscribed lintel. The barn has a roof of imitation stone slates, and contains three wide entrances with segmental arches, and ventilation slits.	II
Lees House Farmhouse; 53.88976°N 2.50746°W	—	1678	A sandstone house with a slate roof and a pebbledashed left gable. There are two storeys and three bays, and outshuts at the rear. The windows are mullioned, those in the left bay dating from the 19th century and containing sashes. The doorway has moulded jambs, the moulding continuing to form semicircular arches on the lintel, which is also inscribed.	II
Lower Lees Farmhouse; 53.89347°N 2.52717°W		1678	The house is in rendered sandstone with a blue slate roof. There are two storeys and two bays with later extensions at the rear. The windows are mullioned, with some mullions missing. The doorway has jambs with moulding that continues around a shaped lintel.	II
Former stables, Browsholme Hall; 53.90180°N 2.48287°W	—	Early to mid 18th century	The stables were moved to their present position in 1804, and later converted into flats. They are in sandstone with quoins and a stone-slate roof, and have two storeys and five bays. The windows are sashes with architraves. In the centre is a wide entrance flanked by Tuscan pilasters, and with a frieze and a cornice.	II
Gate piers, Browsholme Hall; 53.90235°N 2.48149°W	—	18th century	A pair of gate piers that were moved to their present position in the early 1980s. They are in sandstone and each pier is square in section with a moulded cornice and a ball finial.	II
The Mews farmyard 53.90159°N 2.48302°W	—	18th century (possible)	A sandstone house with a stone-slate roof in two storeys with an attic. The north face is gabled and contains mullioned windows. There is a doorway with jambs whose moulding continues to form a triangle on the lintel. In the west face are modern windows.	II
Doeford Bridge; 53.88291°N 2.53312°W		c.1770	The bridge carries a road over the River Hodder. It is in sandstone, and consists of two segmental arches with a central triangular cutwater. The bridge has a solid parapet with coping.	II
Barn, Browsholme Hall; 53.90143°N 2.48343°W	—	Late 18th century (probable)	The barn is in sandstone with a slate roof. Its openings include wide entrances with segmental heads, doorway, some of which are blocked, windows, pitching holes, and ventilation slits.	II
Burholme Bridge; 53.92626°N 2.52220°W		Late 18th century	The bridge carries a road over the River Hodder. It is in sandstone, and consists of two elliptical arches with triangular cutwaters. It has a solid parapet, a string course, and weathered coping.	II
Burholme Farmhouse; 53.93142°N 2.51843°W		Late 18th century (probable)	A stone house with a blue slate roof, and with the west gable slate-hung. There are two storeys and three bays. The windows are mullioned, and the doorway has a chamfered surround and a triangular head.	II
Cow Ark Farmhouse; 53.90335°N 2.50036°W		Late 18th century	A sandstone house with a stone-slate roof, in two storeys and two bays. It has three-light mullioned windows, and a doorway with a plain surround.	II
Cow Ark Smithy; 53.90374°N 2.50094°W	—	Late 18th century (probable)	The former smithy is in sandstone with a stone-slate roof. It has two windows, one with an inscribed stone lintel, and between them is a doorway with a plain surround. At the left is a wide entrance with a timber lintel.	II
Crane Wood Farmhouse; 53.90159°N 2.50471°W	—	Late 18th century (probable)	A stone house with a stone-slate roof in two storeys and three bays. There is one sash window, one modern window, and the other windows are mullioned.	II
Higher Lees Farmhouse; 53.89835°N 2.51254°W		Late 18th century	The farmhouse is in sandstone with a slate roof, in two storeys and two bays. The windows have three lights and are mullioned. There is a central porch formed by sandstone slabs, and the doorway has a plain surround.	II
Parkgate Farmhouse; 53.90668°N 2.50264°W	—	Late 18th century	The house is in stone with a slate roof, and has two storeys and two bays. The windows are mullioned with three lights, and the doorway has a plain surround.	II
Higher Whitewell Farmhouse; 53.92046°N 2.51944°W		Late 18th century	The farmhouse is in sandstone with a slate roof, it has two storeys with attics, and is in three bays. The doorway has Tuscan pilasters, a fluted false keystone, and a cornice. On the front there is a cross window, the other windows being mullioned. The attic windows have semicircular heads, and at the rear is a stair window with mullions and transoms.	II
Browsholme Heights; 53.91303°N 2.49439°W	—	c. 1800	A sandstone house with a stone-slate roof in two storeys and two bays with mullioned windows. On the north face is a gabled porch, and in the upper floor is a seven-light weavers' window. The doorways have plain surrounds.	II
Crimpton Farmhouse; 53.91943°N 2.49007°W		c. 1800	The house is in sandstone with a slate roof and has two storeys. The windows are mullioned, with a seven-light weavers' window in the upper floor. There is a modern porch and a doorway with a plain surround.	II
St Michael's Church; 53.91691°N 2.52087°W		1817	The church replaced an earlier church on the site, and the chancel was added in 1896. It is in rendered stone with sandstone dressings and a slate roof, and consists of a nave, a chancel, a south porch and a north vestry. There is a bellcote on the west gable and a cross on the apex of the right gable. The porch contains a doorway with a chamfered surround and a four-centred head. Inside the church is a west gallery.	II
Browsholme Spire; 53.91392°N 2.48444°W		Early 19th century (probable)	A folly visible from Browsholme Hall, it consists of a sandstone wall about 35 feet (11 m) high. Its southwest face is sloping, and its northeast face is perpendicular. It has two blocked openings, and the top is battlemented.	II
Limekiln; 53.90396°N 2.49879°W		Early 19th century (probable)	The limekiln is in stone and built into a hillside. It has a vaulted opening, and its upper surface is grassed over.	II
West Lodge and gate piers, Browsholme Hall; 53.90127°N 2.48455°W		1832	The lodge and gate piers are in sandstone. The lodge has a stone-slate roof, and is in two storeys. In the west wall is a two-storey bay window with a five-light mullioned window in each floor. Between the windows is a coat of arms, and above them is a solid parapet and a gable. On the south side is a gabled cross wing; on the gables are crocketed pinnacles. The gate piers are square with moulded cornices.	II
Whitewell Hotel; 53.91715°N 2.52036°W		1836	The hotel is in sandstone with a slate roof in two storeys with attics. It consists of a cross wing at the left, and a long main range that has two gables with dormers. The windows are mullioned with chamfered surrounds. On the front is a gabled porch that has a doorway with a chamfered surround. There are ball finials on all the gables.	II
Wall, gateway and arch, Browsholme Hall; 53.90267°N 2.48157°W	—	19th century (possible)	The wall is in sandstone and incorporates earlier material. It stretches northeast from the hall, and contains a gateway with long-and-short jambs, and a lintel decorated with arches and a false fluted keystone. Re-set in the wall is a 17th-century carved head with gadroon decoration, and the wall is carried over a stream by a segmental arch.	II
