= Amanda Parker =

Lord Lieutenant

Amanda Parker JP DL

Lord Lieutenant of Lancashire
- Incumbent
- Assumed office 2 August 2023
- Monarch: Charles III
- Preceded by: Charles Kay-Shuttleworth

High Sheriff of Lancashire
- In office 10 April 2015 – March 2016
- Monarch: Elizabeth II
- Preceded by: Barry Johnson
- Succeeded by: John Morris Barnett

Personal details
- Born: Amanda Jane Backhouse; 1962 (age 63–64) Blackburn, Lancashire
- Spouse: Robert Redmayne Parker (m. 1985)
- Children: 2
- Education: Clitheroe Royal Grammar School; Newcastle University

Amanda Jane Parker JP DL (née Backhouse) is a British businesswoman, philanthropist, and volunteer. She was appointed as a magistrate in East Lancashire in 2005, sitting in both Adult Crime and Family jurisdictions. In 2015, she was appointed by Elizabeth II, in her capacity as Duke of Lancaster, as the High Sheriff of Lancashire. She was the eighth woman in Lancashire, and the twenty-second woman from a duchy county, to hold the office of High Sheriff. She was also the fifth member of the Parker family of Browsholme Hall to serve as High Sheriff of Lancashire.

She was commissioned in 2023 as the Lord Lieutenant of Lancashire, becoming the first woman in Lancashire to ever have been appointed to the office.

== Early life and education ==
Parker was born Amanda Jane Backhouse (in 1962) in Our Lady Of Compassion in the town of Blackburn in Lancashire. She was educated at Clitheroe Royal Grammar School and went on to read agricultural economics at Newcastle University before joining Barclays Bank's graduate trainee program.

== Career ==
Mrs Parker managed her own business in computer systems and home automation; formerly owned a paintball company, which she founded after graduating from university; and now manages the commercial arm of the family estate. She also serves as the châtelaine of her family's estate, Browsholme Hall, which is the oldest surviving historic family home in Lancashire. As châtelaine, Parker has worked to expand tourism at Browsholme and opened the house up as a wedding and conference venue.

=== Life ===
Parker was appointed as a magistrate in East Lancashire in 2005, where she sat in both Adult Crime and Family jurisdictions. She was later elected as chairwoman on the family panel and a Deputy Chair of the Lancashire Bench.

In 2015, Parker was appointed by Elizabeth II, as the Duke of Lancaster, to serve as High Sheriff of Lancashire, succeeding Barry Johnson. On 10 April 2015, she was sworn in to office at a ceremony held at County Hall, Preston. The Queen's Commission was read by Under Sheriff David Cam, in the presence of Commissioners Victoria Robertson and Georgina Noble, Officiating Magistrate Brian Linfield JP, High Sheriff's Chaplain Rev. John Brocklehurst, The Norroy and Ulster King of Arms Timothy Duke, and The Honorary Recorder of Preston HHJ Anthony Russell KC. After Parker made a declaration to "serve the Queen's writs and execute the good laws and statutes of the realm", she was handed the Sheriff's Patent by Lord Lieutenant Charles Kay-Shuttleworth, 5th Baron Shuttleworth. She is the fifth member of the Parker family to serve as High Sheriff. Her banner, as High Sheriff, takes the Parker family coat of arms, green and gold stag heads with a chevron with a diamond lozenge to denote her marriage into the family.

Parker is the eighth woman in Lancashire, and the twenty-second woman from a duchy county, to hold the office of High Sheriff.

Parker's first initiative in office was launching a new website and using social media platforms to connect with the wide Lancastrian population and to promote the work of the office of High Sheriff. In 2015, she spoke at a conference in Leyland addressing domestic abuse prevention in work places. As High Sheriff, she joined police officers on night patrols in Preston, Blackpool and Blackburn.

In May 2015, Parker attended civic ceremonies with the Lord Lieutenant of Lancashire, Lord Shuttleworth, when the queen visited Lancaster Castle as part of the 750th anniversary of the creation of the Duchy of Lancaster.

She was made a deputy lieutenant for Lancashire in November 2016. And in August 2023, she replaced Charles Kay-Shuttleworth as Lord Lieutenant of Lancashire, the first woman to ever have been appointed in Lancashire in the commission's 500-year history.

=== Volunteer work and philanthropy ===
Parker has served on the Board of Governors for Thorneyholme Roman Catholic Primary School from 1999 to 2018 and, in 2002, was appointed as chairman of the Board of Governors. She served as treasurer of Lancashire Hockey Development Group, is a founding member of the Lancashire Hockey Umpiring Association, and supported youth hockey and umpire development throughout the north of England.

She has also served as a trustee of LanPAC, Active Lancashire and local women's centres,. She is a patron of Nightsafe, a Blackburn-based charity that runs homeless shelters for youth. She has served on the Council of the High Sheriffs' Association since 2017 and has chaired its charity, National Crimebeat since 2018. The charity focusses on crime prevention projects initiated and run by young people.

== Personal life ==
Parker lives with her husband, Robert Redmayne Parker, and their two children, Eleanor and Roland, at Browsholme Hall, the Parker family seat in Bashall Eaves. The Parker family is part of the landed gentry, and historically served as the king's park-keepers of Radholme Laund in the Forest of Bowland. Her husband is the Bowbearer of the Forest of Bowland.

Honorary titles
Preceded by Barry Johnson	High Sheriff of Lancashire; 2015	Next: John Morris Barnett
Preceded by Charles Kay-Shuttleworth	Lord Lieutenant of Lancashire; 2023–present	Incumbent
