= Bowland Forest High milestone =

Historic boundary marker in Lancashire, England

Bowland Forest High marker
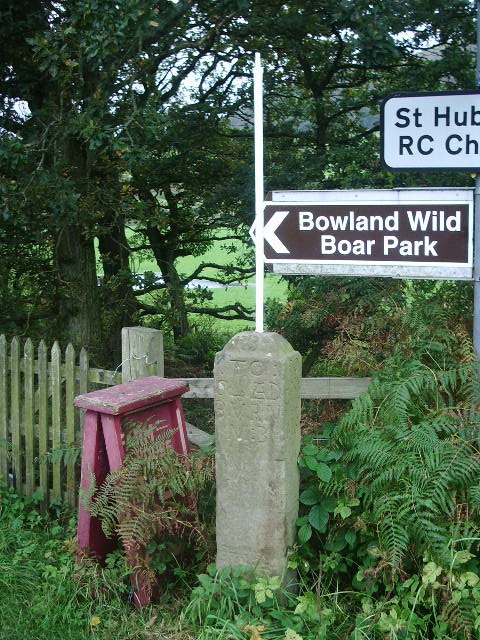
- The marker in 2008

- Location in the Forest of Bowland Location in Ribble Valley Borough Location in Lancashire Location in England
- 53.94478°N 2.5233°W
- Location: Bowland Forest High, Lancashire, England

History
- Built: 1739 (287 years ago)

Site notes
- Governing body: Historic England

The Bowland Forest High milestone is an historic milestone marker in the English parish of Bowland Forest High, in the Trough of Bowland, Lancashire. A Grade II listed structure, erected in 1739, the milestone is in sandstone and has a rectangular plan and a shaped top. It is inscribed with the distances in miles, on one face to Lancaster and to Clitheroe (both in archaic spelling), and on the other face to Slaidburn and to Hornby.

== Inscriptions ==
- West face: "To Lankster 11:MS", which translates to "To Lancaster, 11 miles"
- South face: "To Clitherc 7:MS" ("To Clitheroe, 7 miles")
- East face: "To Slaidburn 3:MS"
- North face: "To Hornby 10:MS"

== See also ==
- Listed buildings in Bowland Forest High
