= Whitewell =

Coordinates: 53.913°N 2.524°W

- Village
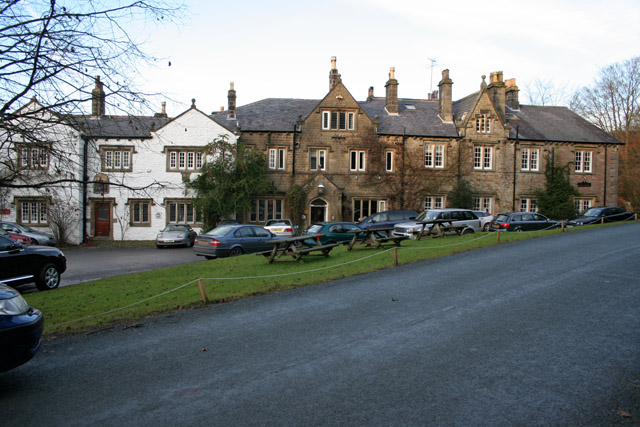
- The Inn at Whitewell

- Location in Ribble Valley Borough Location in the Forest of Bowland Location within Lancashire
- OS grid reference: SD655465
- Civil parish: Bowland Forest Low
- District: Ribble Valley
- Shire county: Lancashire
- Region: North West
- Country: England
- Sovereign state: United Kingdom
- Post town: CLITHEROE
- Postcode district: BB7
- Dialling code: 01200
- Police: Lancashire
- Fire: Lancashire
- Ambulance: North West
- UK Parliament: Ribble Valley

Whitewell is a village within the civil parish of Bowland Forest Low and Ribble Valley borough of Lancashire, England. It is in the Forest of Bowland Area of Outstanding Natural Beauty. Historically, the village fell just within the boundaries of the West Riding of Yorkshire. It was transferred to Lancashire for administrative purposes on 1 April 1974, under the provisions of the Local Government Act 1972. It stands above a bend in the River Hodder.

The village comprises Upper and Lower Whitewell. Lower Whitewell is the site of St Michael's, a chapel of ease built in the late medieval period, certainly no later than 1400, which comes under the Lancashire parish of Whalley. The restaurant and hotel, The Inn at Whitewell, is also situated in Lower Whitewell.

== History ==
From the late 14th century, the Inn anciently housed the forest courts of the Forest of Bowland and provided lodgings for the Master Forester. There is evidence of Master Foresters in Bowland dating back as early as the late 12th century.

It is thought that the ancient administrative centre of the forest was at Hall Hill, north-north-east of the current hamlet. It is conjectured that this motte – now merely an earthwork mound surmounted by trees overlooking the old keeper's cottage at Seed Hill Farm – formed the centre of an early medieval hunting laund (enclosure) known as Radholme which is mentioned as a vill in Domesday.

Sir Walter Urswyk was Master Forester to John of Gaunt, 11th Lord of Bowland and it is Urswyk who seems to have been responsible for the shift to Lower Whitewell sometime between 1372–1403. Bowland appears to undergone wholesale manorial reorganisation in the second half of the 14th century, a process that may have been driven by a fall in population resulting from the Black Death (1348–50) and the absorption of Bowland into the Duchy of Lancaster after 1360.

After 1660, the office of Master Forester fell into abeyance. The forest courts at Whitewell – a swainmote and a woodmote – were presided over by a Chief Steward or more often his deputy, one of whose duties was to appoint a bowbearer (or more often two bowbearers) on behalf of the Lord of Bowland. His responsibilities were akin to those of a chief verderer – an unpaid official appointed to protect vert and venison and responsible for supervising and assisting in the enforcement of forest laws.

The Parkers of Browsholme Hall have traditionally claimed the office of bowbearer as an hereditary right but this claim was an early 19th fabrication and has now been discredited. The family were certainly bowbearers for successive generations between the 17th and 19th centuries but the right of appointment was always a prerogative of their local lord, the Lord of Bowland, the so-called Lord of the Fells.

Although the forest courts at Whitewell fell into disuse in the first half of the 19th century, the 16th Lord of Bowland chose in April 2010 to appoint Robert Redmayne Parker of Browsholme Hall his bowbearer of the Forest of Bowland, the first Parker to be so appointed in more than 150 years.

== Whitewell Estate ==
In 1938, the Duchy of Lancaster purchased 6,000 acres from the Bowland Forest Estate, forming the Whitewell Estate. The surrounding forest has been the hunting ground of kings since the time of William Rufus. Queen Elizabeth II was said to be fond of the area, visiting the Inn at Whitewell for lunch in 2006. Nearby settlements include Dunsop Bridge which claims to be the centre of the United Kingdom, and Clitheroe, the administrative centre of the borough.

== Contemporary ==
Whitewell enjoyed brief media attention in 2009 when it was reported that Charles Towneley Strachey, 4th Baron O'Hagan had stepped forward on behalf of the Towneley family to claim the title of 15th Lord of Bowland. Previously, the Lordship of Bowland had been thought lost or in the possession of the Crown having disappeared from the historical record in late 19th century. The Towneleys had owned the Bowland Forest Estate from 1835 and it transpired that the title had been retained by an extinct family trust. Controversially, Lord O'Hagan went on to sell the title. The 16th Lord of Bowland was later revealed to be a Cambridge University don.

In April 2010, it was announced that the 16th Lord of Bowland had appointed Charles Bowman, landlord of the Inn at Whitewell, as Chief Steward of the Forest of Bowland, the first such appointment since 1922. The appointment was short-lived, however, and in May 2011, chartered surveyor Michael Parkinson of Ingham & Yorke of Clitheroe assumed the role.

The Inn at Whitewell was featured in TV series The Trip directed by Michael Winterbottom, starring Steve Coogan and Rob Brydon as fictionalised versions of themselves doing a restaurant tour of northern England.

== Media gallery ==
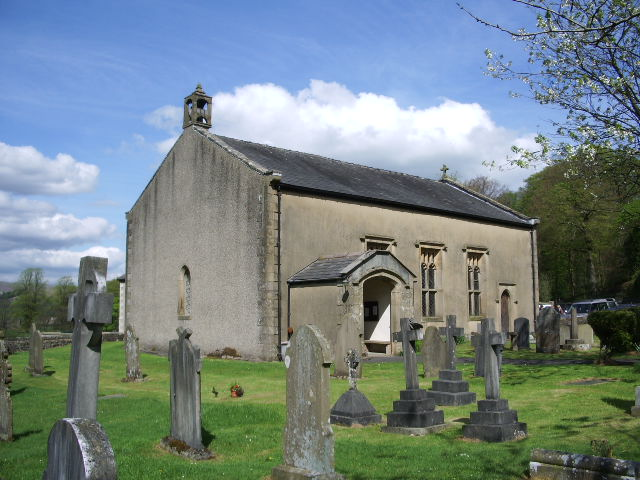
Parish church of St Michael

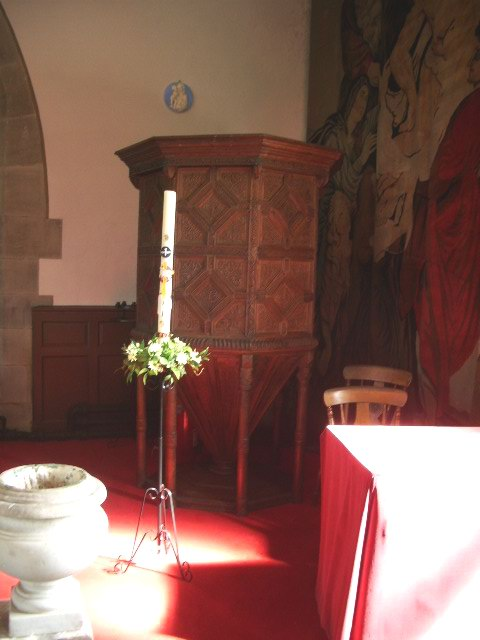
The pulpit in St Michael's church

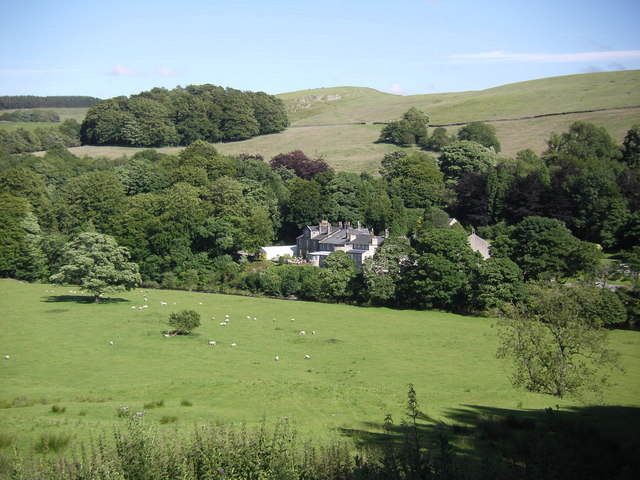
Whitewell from the north

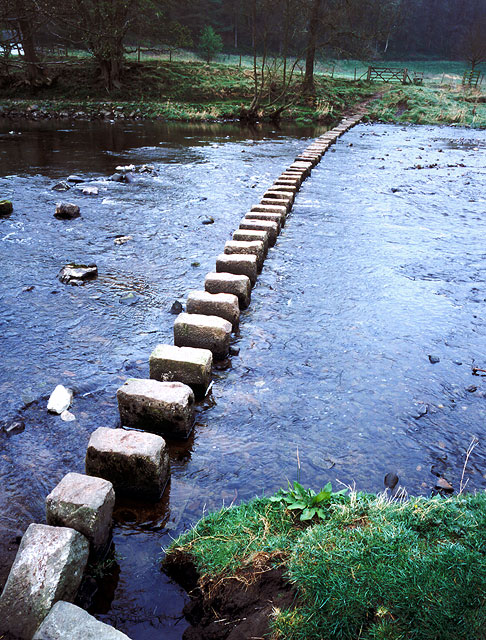
River Hodder

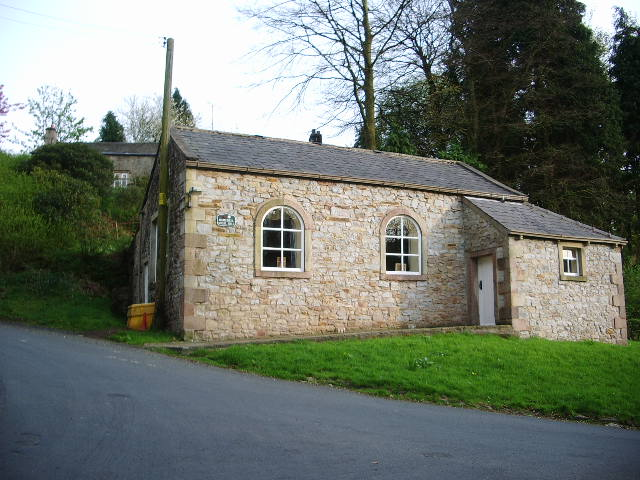
Whitewell Social Hall

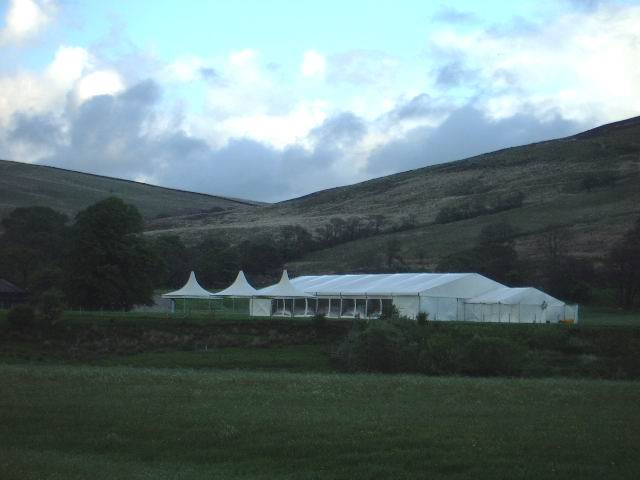
Marquee used during Queen Elizabeth II's visit to the Whitewell Estate in 2006

== See also ==
- Listed buildings in Bowland Forest Low
