= Grey Stone of Trough =

Historic boundary marker in Lancashire, England

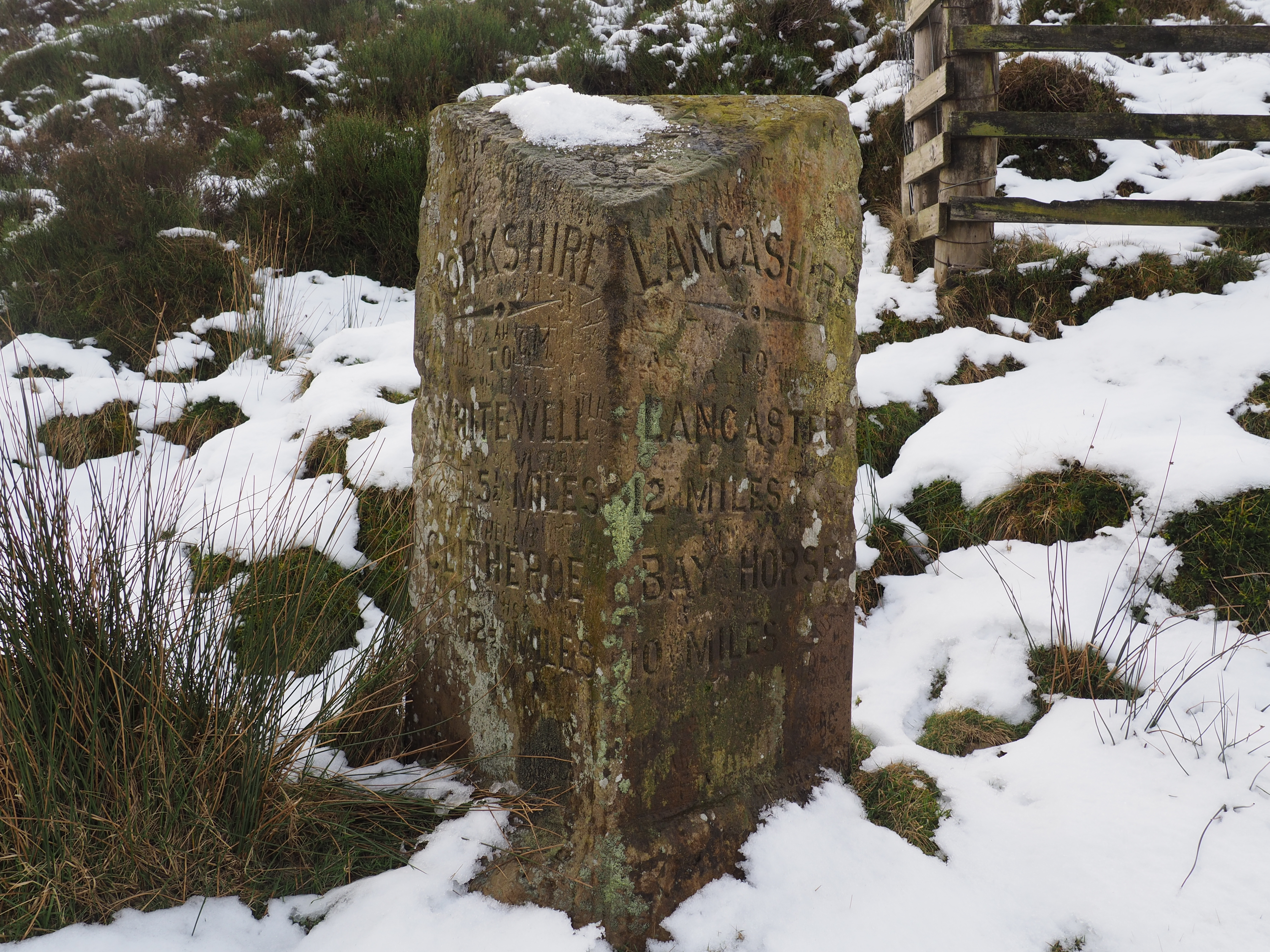
- Both sides of the marker

- Location in the Forest of Bowland Location in Ribble Valley Location in the City of Lancaster district Location in Lancashire
- 53.97226°N 2.5774°W
- Location: Trough of Bowland, Lancashire, England

History
- Built: 1897 (129 years ago)

Site notes
- Governing body: Historic England

The Grey Stone of Trough is an historic boundary marker in Bowland Forest High, in the Trough of Bowland, Lancashire, England. A Grade II listed structure, erected in 1897 and standing on Trough Road, it marks the line of the pre-1974 county boundary between Lancashire and the West Riding of Yorkshire. Historically, the Trough marked the westernmost boundary of the ancient Lordship of Bowland.

It is in sandstone and has a triangular section with inscriptions on the two sides that face the road.

== Inscriptions ==
Lancashire side

"To Lancaster, 12 miles. Bay Horse, 10 miles"

Yorkshire side

"To Whitewell, 5 miles. Clitheroe, 12.5 miles"

== See also ==
- Listed buildings in Bowland Forest High

== Gallery ==
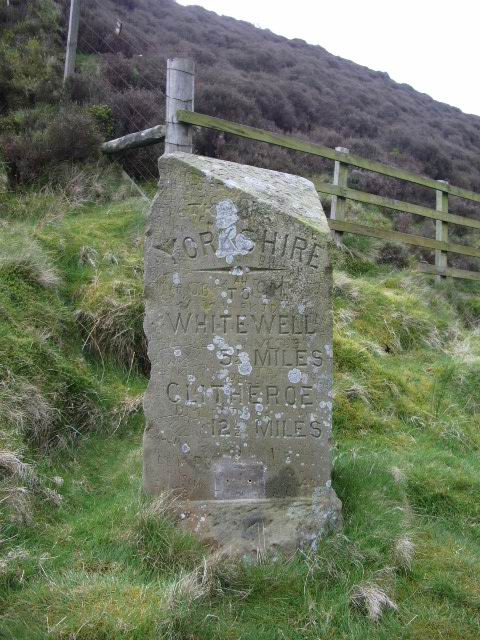
The Yorkshire side of the marker

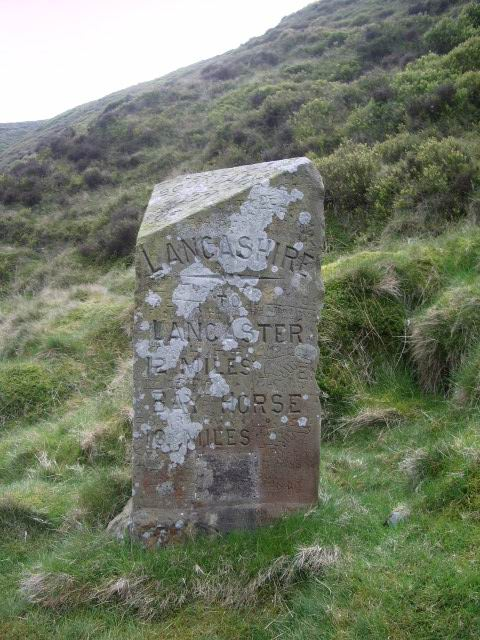
The Lancashire side of the marker
