= Cow Ark Farmhouse =

Building in Ribble Valley, Lancashire, England

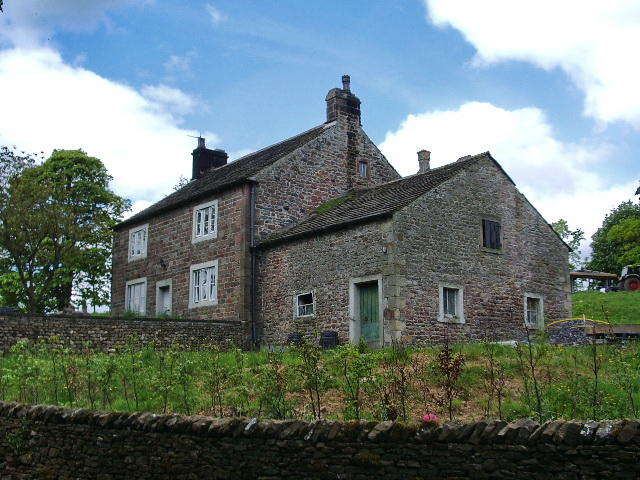
- The building in 2008

- Location within the Borough of Ribble Valley Location within Lancashire
- 53.90335°N 2.50036°W
- Location: Bowland Forest Low, Lancashire, England

History
- Built: c. 1780 (246 years ago)

Site notes
- Area: Ribble Valley

Listed Building – Grade II
- Designated: 16 November 1984
- Reference no.: 1362262

Cow Ark Farmhouse is a historic building in the English parish of Bowland Forest Low, Lancashire. It is Grade II listed, built around 1780, and is a sandstone house with a stone-slate roof, in two storeys and two bays. It has three-light mullioned windows, and a doorway with a plain surround.

== See also ==
- Listed buildings in Bowland Forest Low
