= Higher Lees Farmhouse =

Building in Ribble Valley, Lancashire, England

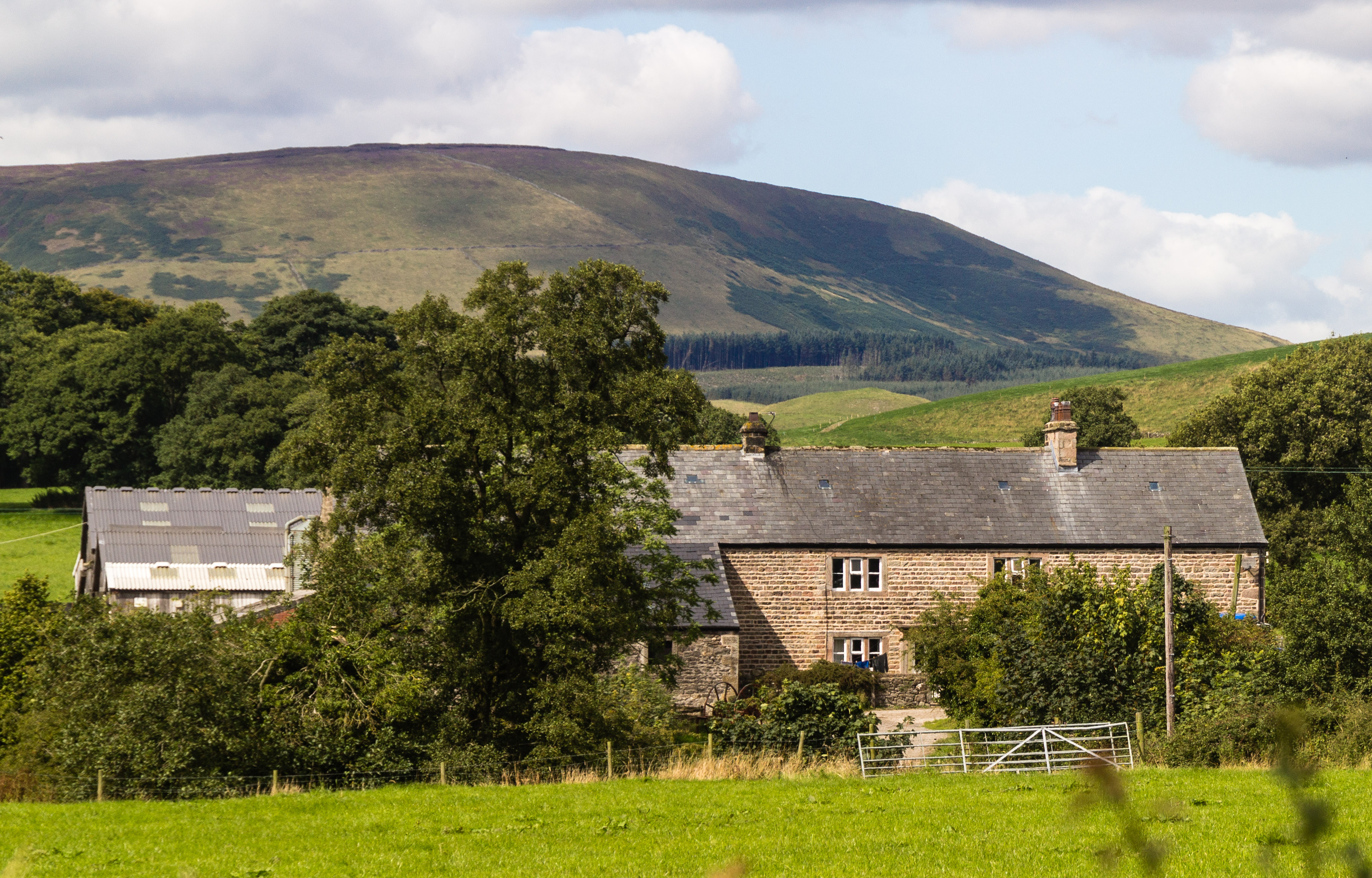
- The building in 2015

- Location within the Borough of Ribble Valley Location within Lancashire
- 53.89835°N 2.51254°W
- Location: Bowland Forest Low, Lancashire, England

History
- Built: c. 1780 (246 years ago)

Site notes
- Area: Ribble Valley

Listed Building – Grade II
- Designated: 16 November 1984
- Reference no.: 1362267

Higher Lees Farmhouse is a historic building in the English parish of Bowland Forest Low, Lancashire. It is Grade II listed, built around 1780, and is in sandstone with a slate roof, in two storeys and two bays. The windows have three lights and are mullioned. There is a central porch formed by sandstone slabs, and the doorway has a plain surround.

A Lower Lees Farmhouse, which is also Grade II listed, is located about 1 mile (1.6 km) to the southwest.

== See also ==
- Listed buildings in Bowland Forest Low
