= Sykes Smelt Mill =

Mediaeval mill in England

- Today's cottages, which are believed to have been built on the site of the mill

- Location within the Borough of Ribble Valley Location within the Forest of Bowland
- Coordinates: 53°57′12″N 2°33′09″W

Sykes Smelt Mill was a mediaeval mill located between Sykes and Hareden in Bowland Forest High, Lancashire, England. It stood on the banks of Langden Brook.

A "Smelt Mill Clough", but not the mill itself, appears on the 1841 tithe map for the Upper Division of the Trough of Bowland. The site is now believed to be occupied by a group of small buildings, known as "Smelt Mill Cottages", one of which is the home of Bowland Pennine Mountain Rescue Team. One of the buildings sits on an old foundation.

There is some evidence that smelting was being done in the early 17th century, during which period Bevis Bulmer was working at the King's Silver Mines on Brunghill Moor, near Newton-in-Bowland. It is possible that Bulmer also worked at Sykes mill (or nearby Ashnott) under a "blanket lease" held by the Society of Mines Royal. It is not known whether Bulmer had a smelt mill on his mines, but in 1630 Charles Coare, from Bashall Eaves, was the smelter at Thievley Mine.
