= Langden Brook =

Water course in Lancashire, England

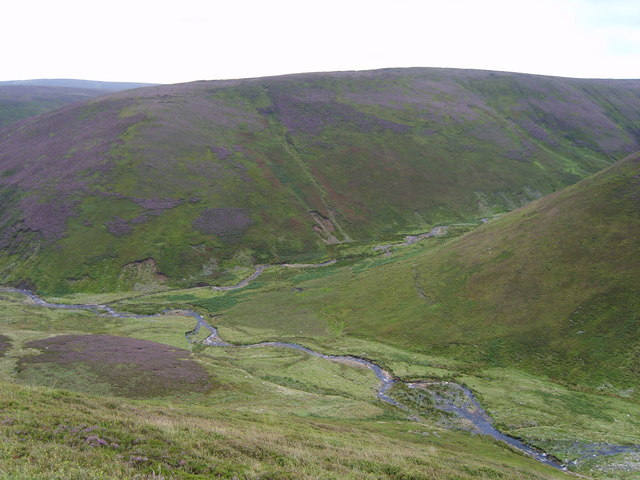
- Above Langden Brook, looking southeast, shortly after it has descended from the summit of Hawthornthwaite Fell, with Fiendsdale Water flowing in from the south

- Location of its confluence with the River Hodder

Location
- Country: United Kingdom

Physical characteristics
- Source
  - location: Hawthornthwaite Fell
  - coordinates: 53.951543467°N 2.64208826566°W
  - elevation: Approx. 470 m (1,540 ft)
- Mouth: Little Long Pond
  - location: Near Dunsop Bridge
  - coordinates: 53.9379706823°N 2.51812976947°W

Langden Brook is a watercourse in the Trough of Bowland, Lancashire, England. A tributary of the River Hodder, its source is near the summit of Hawthornthwaite Fell, which has an elevation of 479 m (1,572 ft). From there, it flows down the fell's southern face, before turning northeast for around 2.5 miles (4.0 km). At Sykes, in Bowland Forest High, it turns southeast for about 2 miles (3.2 km), joining the Hodder a short distance later, about 0.5 miles (0.80 km) south of Dunsop Bridge.

== Walks ==
A 3.8 miles (6.1 km) hike follows the Langden Brook valley. Another one, 6.95 miles (11.18 km) long, takes in nearby Hareden Brook.
