= Whitewell Hotel =

Building in Ribble Valley, Lancashire, England

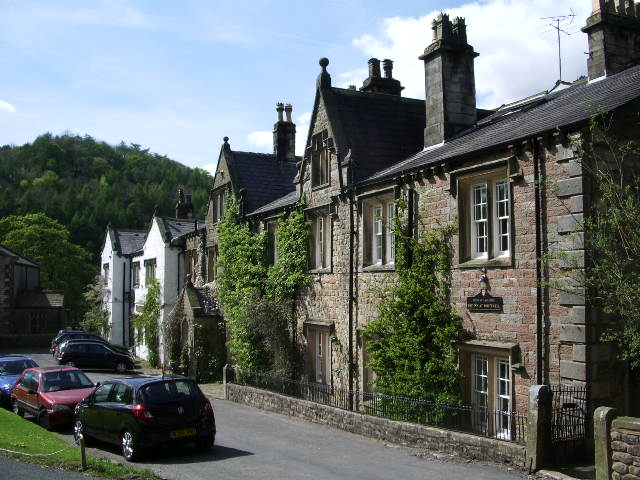
- The building in 2007

- Location within the Borough of Ribble Valley Location within Lancashire
- 53.91715°N 2.52036°W
- Location: Bowland Forest Low, Lancashire, England

History
- Built: 1836 (190 years ago)

Site notes
- Area: Ribble Valley

Listed Building – Grade II
- Designated: 16 November 1984
- Reference no.: 1362264

Whitewell Hotel is an historic building in the English parish of Bowland Forest Low, Lancashire. It is Grade II listed, built in 1836, and is in sandstone with a slate roof in two storeys with attics. It consists of a cross wing at the left, and a long main range that has two gables with dormers. The windows are mullioned with chamfered surrounds. On the front is a gabled porch that has a doorway with a chamfered surround. There are ball finials on all the gables.

== See also ==
- Listed buildings in Bowland Forest Low
