= John Parker (MP for Clitheroe) =

English politician and MP for Clitheroe, born 1754

- Born: 1754
- Died: 1797 (aged 42–43)
- Education: Eton College
- Alma mater: Christ's College, Cambridge
- Spouse: Beatrix Lister
- Relatives: Thomas Lister Parker (son)

John Parker (1754 – 25 May 1797) was an English politician who was member of parliament (MP) for Clitheroe from 1780 to 1782 and Honorary Bowbearer of the Forest of Bowland, Lancashire.

He was the son of Edward Parker of Browsholme Hall, Yorkshire (now in Lancashire), and was educated at Eton College and Christ's College, Cambridge. His paternal aunt was Elizabeth Parker (later Shackleton) who had managed the family seat in the 1740s. Elizabeth documented her life from 1762 which included references to her brother Edward and his son.

Parker married Beatrix Lister, daughter of Thomas Lister (1723–61) of Gisburn Park, and sister of Thomas Lister who controlled the Clitheroe seat. Parker was elected MP for Clitheroe in 1780. Without having spoken in the House, he made way for John Lee in 1782.

The patron of the arts and antiquarian Thomas Lister Parker was his son.

== Notes ==
Honorary titles
Preceded by Edward Parker	Bowbearer of the Forest of Bowland; 1794–97	Succeeded by Thomas Lister Parker
