= Charles Kay-Shuttleworth, 5th Baron Shuttleworth =

British hereditary peer

The Right Honourable The Lord Shuttleworth KG KCVO KStJ

Lord Lieutenant of Lancashire
- In office 1997–2023
- Preceded by: Sir Simon Towneley
- Succeeded by: Amanda Parker

Member of the House of Lords
- In office 5 October 1975 – 11 November 1999
- Preceded by: The 4th Baron Shuttleworth
- Succeeded by: House of Lords Act 1999

Personal details
- Born: The Hon. Charles Geoffrey Nicholas Kay-Shuttleworth; 2 August 1948 (age 78)
- Spouse: Anne Mary Whatman
- Children: The Hon. Thomas and David and William Kay-Shuttleworth
- Parent: Charles Ughtred Kay-Shuttleworth, 4th Baron Shuttleworth (father)
- Relatives: Shuttleworth family
- Education: Eton College
- Known for: British peer and politician

Charles Geoffrey Nicholas Kay-Shuttleworth, 5th Baron Shuttleworth (born 2 August 1948) is a British hereditary peer and former businessman. He is the son of Charles Ughtred Kay-Shuttleworth, 4th Baron Shuttleworth, and his wife, Anne Elizabeth Phillips.

== Life ==
Lord Shuttleworth was educated at Eton before he was elected FRICS.

He was a Director of Burnley Building Society from 1979, Chairman of National & Provincial Building Society and Deputy Chairman of Abbey National plc 1996–2004. Following the acquisition of Abbey National plc by Santander he was appointed Chairman of the Santander UK Group Pension Fund from 2005 to 2018. He served as Chairman of the Rural Development Commission, the government agency responsible for the economic and social well-being of the rural areas of England, from 1990 to 1997.

From 5 October 1975 to 11 November 1999, he was a member of the House of Lords until the 1999 Act.

He was appointed Lord Lieutenant of Lancashire on 13 January 1997, and he was Chairman of the Association of Lord Lieutenants 2008–2018. He has served as a Member of the Council of the Duchy of Lancaster since 1998 and was appointed Chairman of the Council from 2006 to 2014.

The heir apparent to the barony is his son, the Hon. Thomas Kay-Shuttleworth (born 1976).

Lord Shuttleworth is Patron of a number of charitable organisations across Lancashire.

== Honours ==
Lord Shuttleworth was made a Knight Commander of the Royal Victorian Order (KCVO) in the 2011 New Year Honours, in addition to being a Knight of the Order of St John (KStJ). He was appointed a Knight Companion of the Order of the Garter (KG) on 23 April 2016.

== Arms ==
Coat of arms of Charles Kay-Shuttleworth, 5th Baron Shuttleworth
Coronet Coronet of a Baron Crest 1st: a Cubit Arm in Armour proper, grasping in the gauntlet a Shuttle Sable, tipped and furnished Or (Shuttleworth). 2nd: on a Crescent Azure, a Goldfinch proper (Kay). Escutcheon Quarterly: 1st and 4th, Argent, three Shuttles Sable, tipped and furnished Or (Shuttleworth); 2nd and 3rd, Argent, three Ermine Spots within two Bendlets Sable, all between two Crescents Azure (Kay). Supporters Dexter: a Weaver habited in Cap and Apron proper, holding in the exterior hand a Shuttle Sable, tipped and furnished Or. Sinister: a Seaman holding in his exterior hand a Ship's Lamp, all proper. Motto KYND KYNN KNAWNE KEPE (Kind kin when known keep) Orders Order of the Garter circlet (appointed 23 April 2016) HONI SOIT QUI MAL Y PENSE (Shame on him who thinks evil of it); Venerable Order of Saint John (appointed KStJ 2011); Royal Victorian Order (appointed KCVO 2011) Banner The banner of the Baron's arms used as knight of the Garter depicted at St George's Chapel.

== Styles ==
- The Hon. Charles Kay-Shuttleworth (1948–1975)
- The Lord Shuttleworth (1975–2011)
- The Lord Shuttleworth KCVO (2011–2016)
- The Lord Shuttleworth KG KCVO (2016–present)

== Honours ==

Ribbon	Description	Notes
	Order of the Garter (KG)	Knight Companion; 23 April 2016
	Royal Victorian Order (KCVO)	Knight Commander; 2011 New Year Honours List
	Order of St John (KStJ)	Knight of Justice
	Queen Elizabeth II Golden Jubilee Medal	2002; UK version of this medal
	Queen Elizabeth II Diamond Jubilee Medal	2012; UK version of this medal
	Queen Elizabeth II Platinum Jubilee Medal	2022; UK version of this medal
	King Charles III Coronation Medal	2023; UK version of this medal

== See also ==
- Baron Shuttleworth
- https://www.npg.org.uk/collections/search/portrait/mw77567/Charles-Geoffrey-Nicholas-Kay-Shuttleworth-5th-Baron-Shuttleworth?LinkID=mp68153&search=sas&sText=Shuttleworth+&role=sit&rNo=0

== Notes ==
Honorary titles
Preceded by Sir Simon Towneley	Lord Lieutenant of Lancashire; 1997–2023	Succeeded by Amanda Parker
Peerage of the United Kingdom
Preceded by Charles Kay-Shuttleworth	Baron Shuttleworth; 1975–present Member of the House of Lords (1975–1999)	Incumbent; Heir apparent: Hon. Thomas Kay-Shuttleworth
