= River Loud =

River in Lancashire, England

Coordinates: 53°53′N 2°32′W

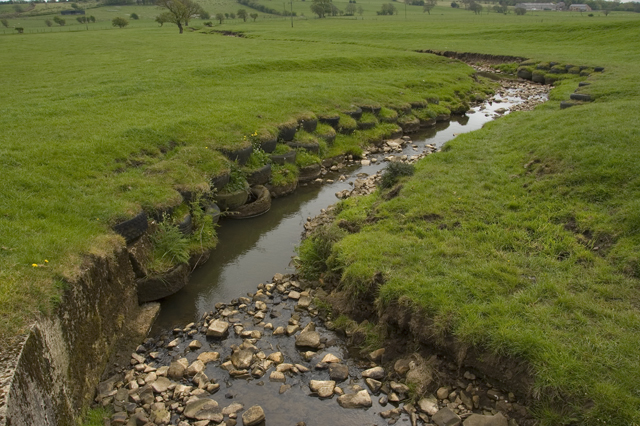
River Loud near Longridge

The River Loud is a river of Lancashire, England.

Starting out on Parlick, the Loud meanders mainly through the parish of Chipping, tracing its course first south-west, then south-east and, at Gill Bridge by Withinreap Farm, east before veering north-east, on a similar alignment to Longridge Road, passing Hesketh Lane and collecting Chipping Brook from Chipping to the north, before joining the east-flowing River Hodder near Doeford Bridge.

In geological history, the lower reaches of the Loud carried the waters of the River Hodder westward from Doeford Bridge to the Derby Arms north of Longridge (reversing the modern-day eastward flow), continuing south-westward through Halfpenny Lane on the west side of Longridge to join either Blundell Brook past Broughton church and Woodplumpton to join the River Wyre, or else Savick Brook through Fulwood to join the River Ribble.
