= Lower Lees Farmhouse =

Building in Ribble Valley, Lancashire, England

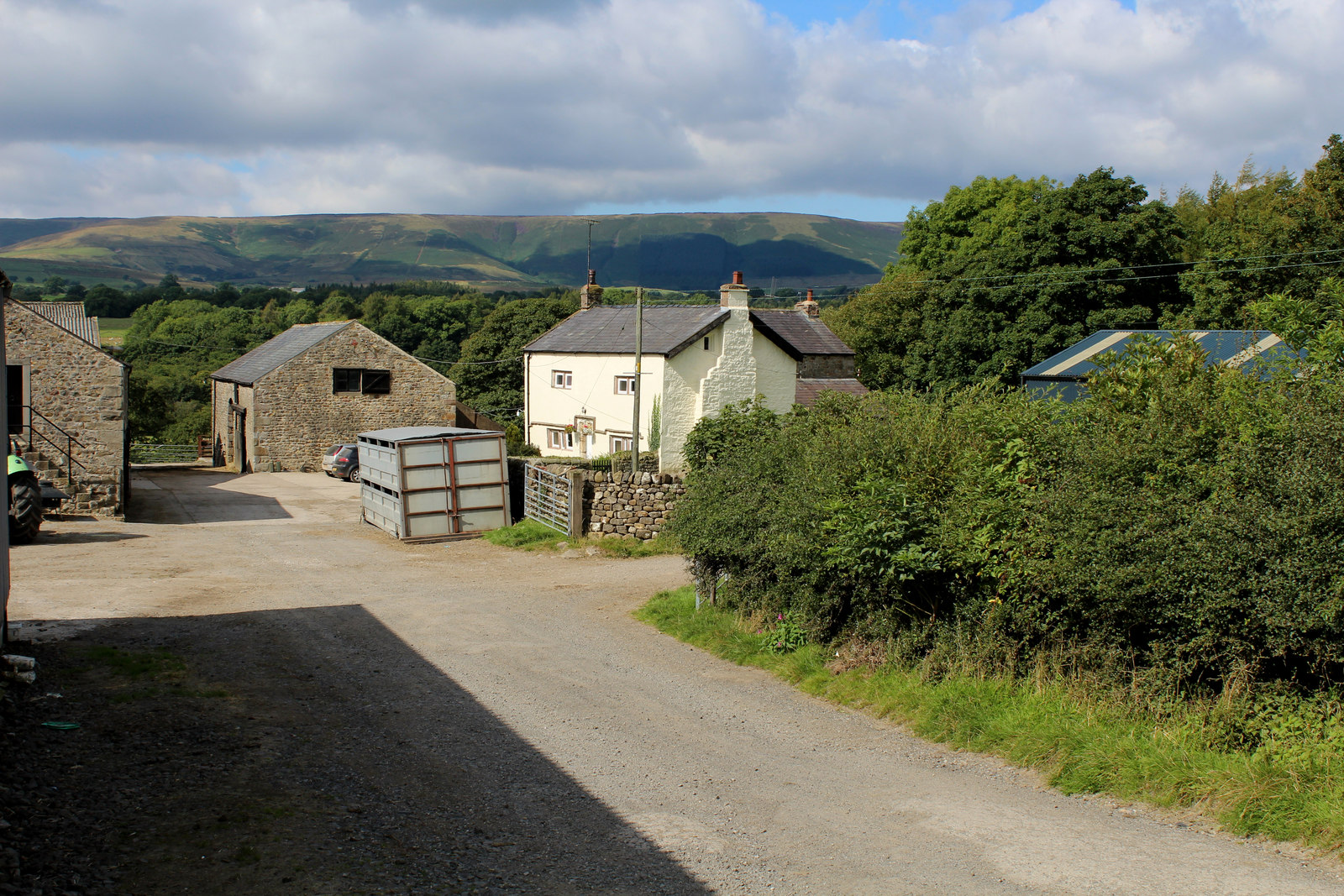
- The building in 2015, looking northwest to the Bowland Fells

- Location within the Borough of Ribble Valley Location within Lancashire
- 53.89347°N 2.52717°W
- Location: Bowland Forest Low, Lancashire, England

History
- Built: 1678 (348 years ago)

Site notes
- Area: Ribble Valley

Listed Building – Grade II
- Designated: 16 November 1984
- Reference no.: 1072241

Lower Lees Farmhouse is a historic building in the English parish of Bowland Forest Low, Lancashire. It is Grade II listed, built in 1678, and is a sandstone farmhouse with a slate roof and a pebbledashed left gable. There are two storeys and three bays, and outshuts at the rear. The windows are mullioned, those in the left bay dating from the 19th century and containing sashes. The doorway has moulded jambs, the moulding continuing to form semicircular arches on the lintel, which is also inscribed.

A Higher Lees Farmhouse, which is also Grade II listed, is located about 1 mile (1.6 km) to the northeast.

== See also ==
- Listed buildings in Bowland Forest Low
