= Dunsop Bridge (structure) =

Bridge at Dunsop Bridge, England

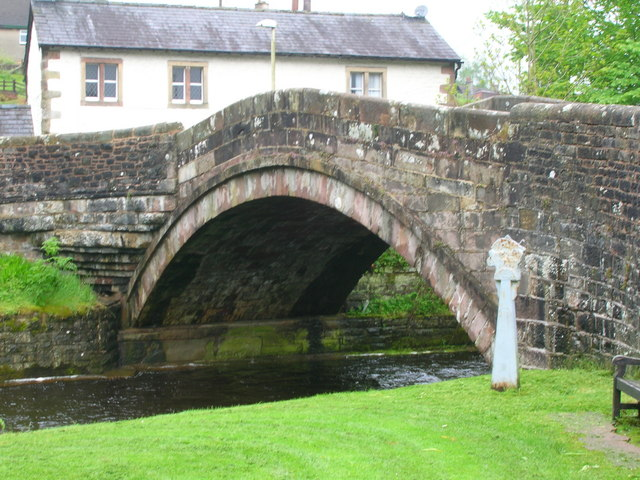
- The bridge in 2009, when it was around 200 years old
- Coordinates: 53.94577°N 2.52009°W
- Crosses: River Dunsop

History
- Opened: c. 1800

Statistics

Listed Building – Grade II
- Designated: 16 November 1983
- Reference no.: 1362242

Dunsop Bridge is a bridge in the English village of the same name. The structure, which dates to the early 19th century, crosses the River Dunsop. A Grade II listed structure, it is in sandstone, and consists of a single segmental arch with a string course and a solid rounded parapet.

== See also ==
- Listed buildings in Bowland Forest High
