= Elizabeth Shackleton =

English diarist (1726–1781)

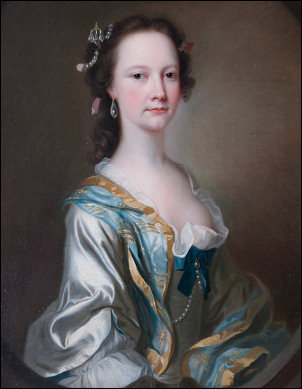
- when she was Elizabeth Parker
- Born: Elizabeth Parker; 1726 baptised in London, England
- Died: 1781 (aged 54–55); Barrowford, England
- Occupation: Diarist
- Known for: her diary
- Spouses: Robert Parker (m. 1751; died 1758); John Shackleton (m. 1765)
- Children: 3
- Relatives: John Parker (nephew)

Elizabeth Shackleton (1726–1781), born Elizabeth Parker, was an English diarist. She was the only daughter of her father who inherited an estate in Yorkshire. She made a disappointing first marriage and a disastrous second. She is remembered for her diaries and letters which her family preserved. The diaries were the basis of an award-winning book about "Women's Lives in Georgian England" in 1998.

== Life ==
Shackleton was likely baptised on 22 December 1726 at St Peter upon Cornhill in the City of London. Her parents, both of the landed gentry, were Elizabeth (born Southouse) and John Parker (1695–1754), who was a linen draper from London. In 1728, her father inherited Browsholme Hall and its estates which were then in the West Riding of Yorkshire. The income from the estates was £500 a year, so Elizabeth and her parents moved to the hall. Elizabeth was an only, and maybe over-indulged, daughter. Her father and her extended family thought her witty and clever; she managed the house from the 1740s after her mother died young; and they expected that she would marry well. She was given silk dresses and attended events locally and during "the season" in London in the expectation of making a good match. Shackleton however, decided that she would marry her second cousin Robert Parker. He was "lesser gentry", his income was £290 per year, and his prospects were a disappointment to Shackleton's family.

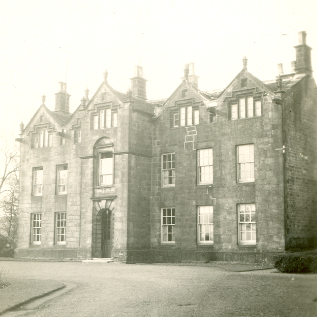
Alkincoats Hall (photo from 1937) was thought to be beneath her

Parker was a medical graduate of Emmanuel College, Cambridge who was known for his medicine for treating rabies. He had supported Bonnie Prince Charlie's claim in 1745 and he owned Alkincoats Hall – which he had improved in preparation for a new wife in 1751 and 1752. Alkincoats was the home of his branch of the Parker family and it became Elizabeth's home when she married him on 1 October 1751. Her husband died in 1758 and she, as a widow, managed the estate for their three sons, including Thomas (1754–1819) who was his father's heir.

Elizabeth became a diarist in 1762. In 1765 she ran off with John Shackleton and married him in Gretna Green. She allegedly volunteered to become the wife of a wool merchant who was eighteen years younger than her. By 1770, her new husband was devoting his life to drinking, hunting and fishing. He was also, embarrassingly, befriending workmen, their servants, and their tenants. His inebriation made it difficult to keep up appearances. Elizabeth's brother had already banned her from visiting for six years after they married. In 1775, she moved out of Alkincoats as her son, who now owned it, had married. She went to live at her husband's new three-storey house, Pasture House, at Barrowford where her husband physically abused her.

== Death and legacy ==
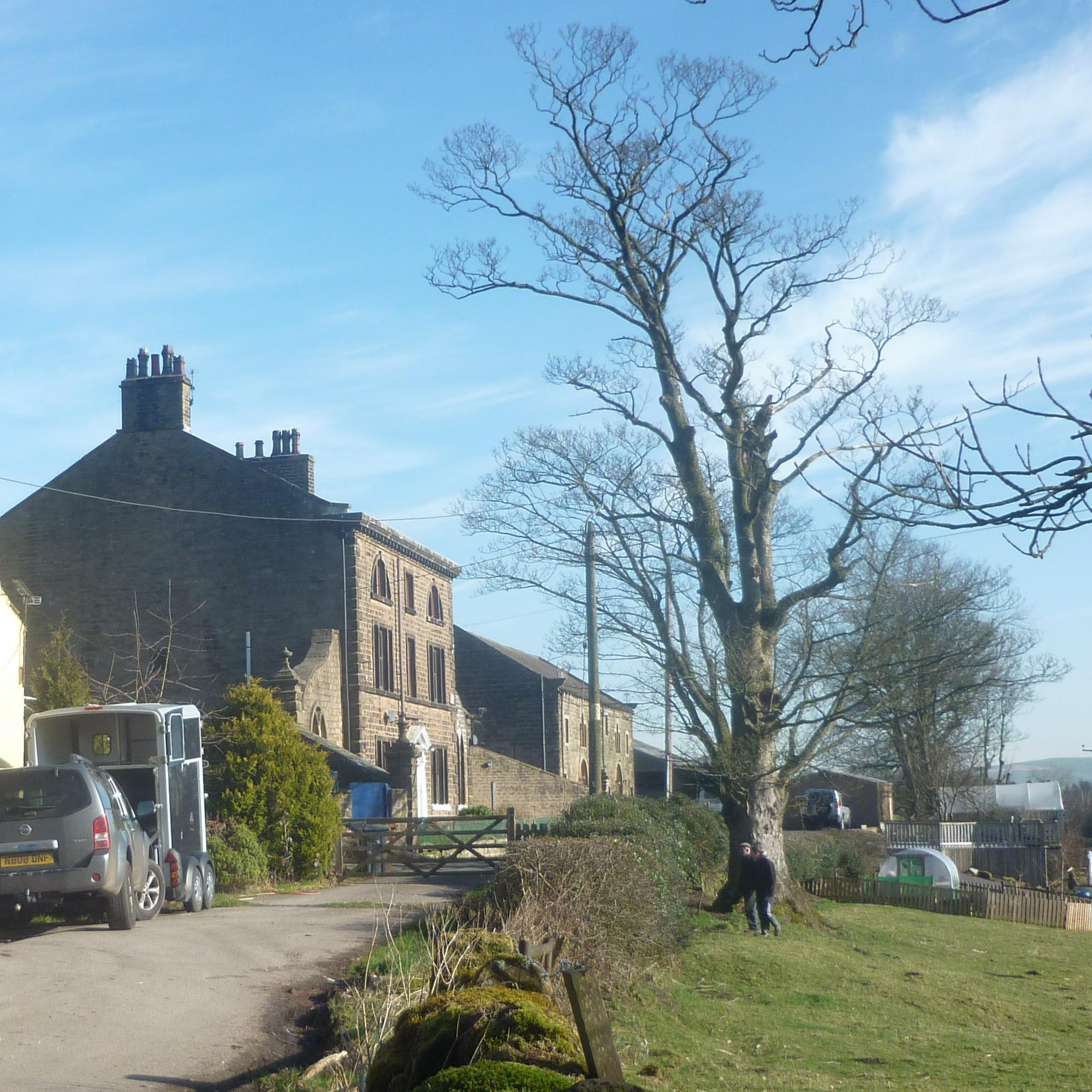
Pasture House, where Shackleton died, is a listed building

Shackleton died in 1781. Her legacy was her portrait, her writing, a bracelet, and a memorial in St Bartholomew's Church, Colne, where she was buried on 2 September. Her family kept her journals and writing and at one time lent them to the local record office. The last lend was in 1995 and consisted of her love letters.

Professor Amanda Vickery teaches modern history and her first book was based on her research including the writings of Shackleton. Her book was titled The Gentleman's Daughter: Women's Lives in Georgian England (1998), for which she received the Whitfield prize, the Wolfson History prize and the Longman-History Today prize.
