= Forest Law =

Forest Law may refer to:

- Royal forest § Forest law, a system established by William the Conqueror put in service to protect game animals and their forest habitat from destruction
- Forestry law, laws governing activities in designated forest lands with respect to forest management and timber harvesting
- Forest Law (Tekken), a playable character in Namco Bandai's Tekken fighting game franchise
