= Browsholme Hall =

Browsholme
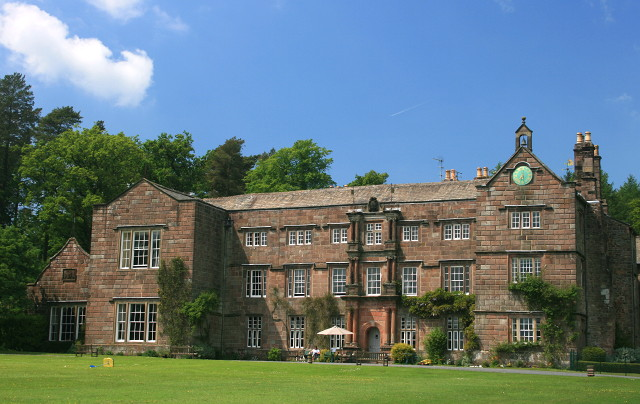
- Browsholme Hall from the front

- Location within the Borough of Ribble Valley
- 53.9024°N 2.4819°W
- Location: Ribble Valley, Lancashire

Site notes
- Website: Official website

Listed Building – Grade I
- Designated: 16 November 1954
- Reference no.: 1072272

Browsholme Hall /ˈbruːzəm/ is a privately owned Tudor house in the parish of Bowland Forest Low in the borough of Ribble Valley, Lancashire (although historically in the West Riding of Yorkshire), England. It is claimed to be the oldest surviving family home in Lancashire. Since 1954, it has been designated a Grade I listed building by English Heritage.

== History ==
In the fourteenth century, Edmund Parker was park-keeper of Radholme Laund, west of Browsholme, one of the two great deer parks in the Forest of Bowland. In 1393, his sons Richard and John were deputy parkers of Radholme, but from 1380, they had a lease of the vaccary (mediaeval cattle farm) of Browsholme. Richard probably built the original house on the present site around that time.

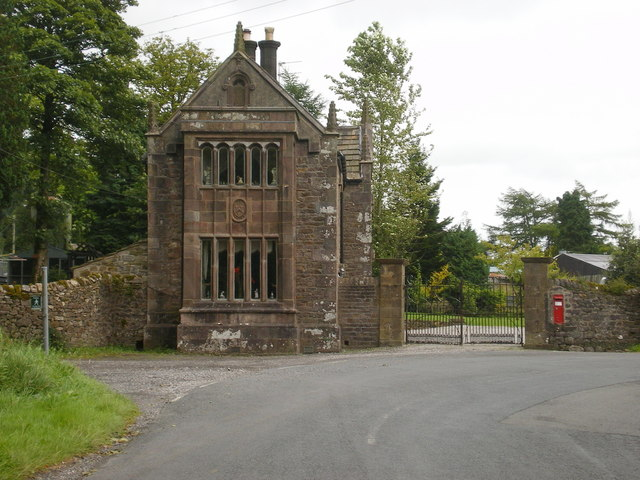
Browsholme Hall Lodge

When in 1507, King Henry VII disafforested Bowland, Edmund Parker obtained a copyhold of Nether Browsholme and began the present house. Thomas Parker purchased the freehold of Browsholme from the Crown in 1603 and further improved the house, which had been enlarged by his father. His grandson, also called Thomas, is believed to have added a formal garden in 1674.

John Parker (1695–1754), who was a linen draper from London, inherited the hall and its estates, which were worth £500 a year, in 1728. He and his wife Elizabeth (born Southouse) and his daughter Elizabeth then moved to live there. His daughter managed the house from the 1740s when her mother died young. Elizabeth notably documented her life, as her brother Edward inherited the house, before he left it to his son, John Parker M.P.

On the death of his father, John Parker M.P. in 1797, Thomas Lister Parker succeeded to the Browsholme estate. In 1804 and 1805, he made alterations to the Hall, rebuilding the west wing, and afterwards he made additions under the superintendence of Sir Jeffry Wyatville. He had a taste for landscape gardening, and between 1797 and 1810, spent large sums in laying the grounds. In the house, he displayed a collection of antiquities and pictures, partly formed by himself. He had a large series of drawings and prints bought during a tour on the continent in 1800 and 1801, at Moscow, Venice, and Paris; a large collection of drawings of castles and manor-houses by John Chessell Buckler, and portfolios of his own drawings. He also possessed pictures of the Flemish school and works of James Northcote and Thomas Gainsborough. Thomas Lister Parker ultimately bankrupted himself and was forced to pass the estate to a cousin.

John William Robinson Parker (1857–1938) was a soldier and historian who was involved in numerous county societies. His son, Robert Goulbourne Parker (1900–75), repaired Browsholme in 1958 with the aid of the Historic Buildings Council, and from 1957, opened the house to the public, giving personally guided tours.

In 2010, the present owners Robert Redmayne Parker and Amanda Parker, restored the 17th-century tithe barn for use as an event space. In April 2015 Amanda Parker became High Sheriff of Lancashire.

In October 2021, the building was one of 142 sites across England to receive part of a £35-million injection into the government's Culture Recovery Fund.

== Bowbearers of the Forest of Bowland ==
The Parker family have been Bowbearers of the Forest of Bowland since the Restoration. The office fell into abeyance in the late 19th century but in 2010, the 16th Lord of Bowland re-asserted his ancient right and appointed Robert Redmayne Parker his Bowbearer of the Forest of Bowland, the first Parker to be so appointed in more than 150 years.

In 2011, Robert Parker led a party of dignitaries from the Bowland Higher Division Parish Council, the Forest authorities, and local community, to welcome the 16th Lord to Dunsop Bridge on his first official visit to the Forest. In October 2012, Robert Parker was formally presented with his Bowbearer's "wand of office" by the 16th Lord at a public ceremony in Slaidburn. This ceremony marked the 90th anniversary of the final meeting of the manorial court at the town's Tudor courthouse.

== The hall today ==
The hall functions a wedding venue. The house and gardens are open to the public, between 11am and 4pm, on Wednesdays only in May and September, and on Tuesdays and Wednesdays in June, July and August.

== See also ==
- Grade I listed buildings in Lancashire
- Listed buildings in Bowland Forest Low
