= Alkincoats Hall =

Former country house in Colne, Lancashire, England

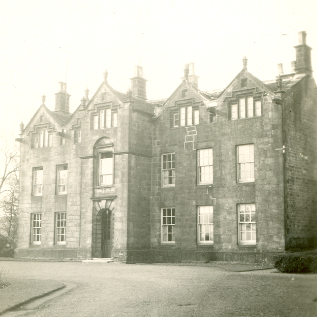
- in 1937

- Location within the Borough of Pendle

General information
- Status: Demolished
- Location: Colne, England
- Coordinates: 53.8643°N 2.1863°W
- Completed: 1575
- Demolished: 1957

Alkincoats Hall was a country house in Colne, Lancashire, England. Part of the estate in which the hall stood is now the 35-acre (14 ha) Alkincoats public park.

Originally built in the north of the estate in 1575, the hall was enlarged in 1720 and demolished in 1957.

== History ==
Alkincoats was once an estate owned by the de Alkincoats family which in 1570 comprised several estates held by John Parker, a descendant of the de Alkincoats, and James de Walton. It was the home of a branch of the Parker family of Browsholme, who were park keepers for the King's forest of Bowland.

The hall and its estate were bought by Robert Parker (1662–1714). It passed down through Parker family from Robert to his son Thomas, Robert (1720–1758). Robert had married his second cousin Elizabeth Parker and she, as a widow, managed the house for their son Thomas (1754–1819) when he was a child. Elizabeth became a notable diarist and then she ran off disastrously with a younger man while Thomas grew to be a Justice of the Peace (J.P.) and Deputy Lieutenant {D.L.} of Lancashire. He left the house to his son Thomas Parker (died 1832), an Army captain, J.P. and D.L. who also bought Browsholme Hall from his cousin. On his early death he was succeeded by his younger brother Edward (1786–1865), also a J.P. and D.L., who left it to his son Thomas Goulburne Parker (1818–1879) a barrister-at-law, J.P. and D.L. for the West Riding of Yorkshire and also J.P. for Lancashire. Thomas Goulburne had three sons, the eldest of which was Edward (1846–1894) who died childless, as a result of which ownership passed to his younger brother, Colonel John Robinson Parker (1857–1938), who later fought in the Boer War.

In 1921 the 92 1/2-acre (37.5 ha) estate was sold to Colne Borough Council by Colonel Parker for the sum of £24,082 and partly used as a public park. The hall was demolished in 1957 because of structural problems. The estate lodge, now a private house, is a grade II listed building. The park has held Green Flag status each year since 2009.

== Etymology ==
The name Alkincoats, for which the earliest recorded form was Altenecote (1202), likely originated as a Brittonic formation. The first element may be al-, "bright, shining", or alt, "slope, hillside" (see Oldham). The second is possibly tan, "under, below" (Welsh dan). This is suffixed with the definite article -ï[r] and *cę:d, "wood, forest" (Welsh -y coed). A possible meaning of the name is "hillside below the wood". A diminutive of the aforementioned alt, *alltan, "little cliff", may underlie the first part of the name.
