= Bowbearer =

In Old English law, a Bowbearer was an under-officer of the forest who looked after all manner of trespass on vert or venison, and who attached, or caused to be attached, the offenders, in the feudal Court of Attachment.

The bow was a renowned English weapon, made of wood from the yew tree.

== Examples of the role ==
The best-documented example of Bowbearers in England is to be found in the Forest of Bowland in north-eastern Lancashire.

In the late twelfth century, Oughtred de Bolton, son of Edwin de Bolton ("Edwinus Comes de Boelton" in the Domesday Book of 1086) is described as an early Bowbearer in the royal forests of Bowland and Gilsland, at the time of Henry II. However, this account is flawed as the possibility of Oughtred being the son of Edwin is fanciful and cannot be substantiated. It would have been impossible for Oughtred to have been Bowbearer of Gilsland before the 1170s when the barony was first brought into the Norman realm. Prior to that, it had formed part of the Kingdom of Scotland.

== Bowbearers and Master Foresters of Bowland ==
After the early fourteenth century, it is often difficult to distinguish between Bowbearers and Master Foresters in the Bowland record:

Bowbearers of Bowland (1150–1304)

- 1157 Uchtred de Bolton
- 1212 Elias de Bolton
- 1220 Richard de Bolton
- 1260 John de Bolton
- 1300 Edward de Acre
- 1304 Richard de Spaldington

Master Foresters and Bowbearers of Bowland (1304–1650)

- 1304–1311 John de Bolton
- 1311–1322 Thurstan de Norleygh
- 1322–1327 Edmund Dacre
- 1327–1330 Richard de Spaldyngton
- 1331–1353 Adam de Urswyk
- 1353–1372 John de Radcliffe
- 1372–1403 Sir Walter Urswyk
- 1403–1424 Sir Henry Hoghton
- 1424–1425 Sir Thomas Hoghton
- 1425–1432 Sir Thomas Tunstall
- 1432–1437 Sir William Assheton
- 1437–1459 Richard, Earl of Salisbury
- 1459–1471 Sir Richard Tunstall
- 1471–1485 Richard, Duke of Gloucester
- 1485–1485 Sir James Harrington
- 1485–1519 Sir Edward Stanley, later Lord Monteagle
- 1519–1526 Sir Richard Tempest
- 1526–1543 Sir Thomas Clifford (Bowbearer Sir Nicholas Tempest, executed 1537)
- 1543–1553 Sir Arthur D’Arcy
- 1554–1554 Sir Thomas Talbot
- 1554–1594 Sir Richard Shireburn of Stonyhurst
- 1594–1630 Sir Richard Hoghton
- 1631–1642 Sir Gilbert Hoghton
- 1645–1650 Sir Richard Hoghton

Bowbearers of Bowland after 1660

- 1662–1682 Thomas Parker
- 1682–1689 Curwen Rawlinson
- 1689–1706 Thomas Lister of Westby
- 1689–1721 Edward Parker
- 1707–1745 Thomas Lister of Westby, son of above
- 1721–1754 John Parker
- 1745–1757 John Fenwick of Burrow Hall, Lord of Claughton
- 1754–1794 Edward Parker
- 1794–1797 John Parker
- 1797–1820 Thomas Lister Parker (claimed until 1858)
- 1820–1832 Thomas Parker of Alkincoats
- 1835–1871 Richard Eastwood
- 1871–2010 No Bowbearers appointed
- 2010– Robert Redmayne Parker

Perhaps the most notorious Bowbearer of the Forest of Bowland was Sir Nicholas Tempest, who was executed at Tyburn in 1537. Tempest was one of the northern leaders of the Pilgrimage of Grace, the Catholic uprising against Henry VIII and was linked to Sawley Abbey.

=== Parker family ===
The Parker family were the Bowbearers of the Forest of Bowland from the time of the English Restoration in 1660. The family likes to claim the office traces back as far as Robert Parker in the early 16th century but this is difficult to substantiate given the available evidence. In reality, while the family did have Bowbearers over many generations between the seventeenth and nineteenth centuries, the office was always granted to them by their local lord, the Lord of Bowland, the so-called Lord of the Fells.

The Parker hereditary claim appears to have been concocted in the early part of the nineteenth century by Thomas Lister Parker, a socially ambitious individual who wished to make a mark in London society. Thomas Lister Parker eventually bankrupted himself due to his various extravagances but not before he had corrupted the historical record. Both Whitaker's and Baines' accounts of the history of Bowland bear witness to that corruption. The last known Bowbearer of the Forest of Bowland was Richard Eastwood of Thorneyholme, an acclaimed breeder of racehorses and shorthorn cattle and land agent to John Towneley, 13th Lord of Bowland. Eastwood died in 1871 and is buried at St Hubert's, Dunsop Bridge.

Although the Lord of Bowland's courts at Whitewell that appointed the Bowbearers fell into disuse in the first half of the nineteenth century, it was reported in April 2010 that William Bowland, 16th Lord of Bowland had re-asserted his ancient right and appointed Robert Redmayne Parker of Browsholme Hall his Bowbearer of the Forest of Bowland, the first Parker to be so appointed in more than 150 years.

In 2011, Robert Parker led a party of dignitaries from the Bowland Higher Division Parish Council, the Forest authorities, and local community, to welcome the 16th Lord of Bowland to Dunsop Bridge on his first official visit to the forest. In October 2012, Robert Parker was formally presented with his Bowbearer's "wand of office" by the 16th Lord of Bowland at a public ceremony in Slaidburn. This ceremony marked the 90th anniversary of the final meeting of the manorial court at the town's Tudor courthouse.

== Other English Bowbearers ==
Other notable examples of Bowbearers in England include those appointed in the Forests of Delamere, Hatfield, and Mashamshire.

In 1513, a Richard Done of Utkinton is described as the hereditary Bowbearer of Delamere.

In 1605, Sir Robert Swift of Streetthorpe (Edenthorpe) was appointed Bowbearer to the Royal Chase of Hatfield by James I. A local tradition in that area states that the many yew trees of the region were planted as a result, to provide wood for bows. The Complete Shakespeare Encyclopedia by Carol Enos also states that "Alvanley Hall, the property of William Arden, Baron Alvanley, has been abandoned as the residence of the family for nearly a century and a half, and little of the house remains. Lord Alvanley is hereditary Bowbearer of the Forest of Delamere, and possesses the ancient bugle horn by which his ancestors have held that office almost from the period of the Norman Invasion."

In 1632, Sir Francis Armitage of Kirklees, was appointed Bowbearer of the Free Chase of Mashamshire.

== Other uses ==
The bowbearer is not a uniquely English phenomenon. There was an officer to the king, described as a "bowbearer", in ancient Persia. The officers in most close attendance on the monarch's person were, in war, his charioteer, his stoolbearer, his bowbearer, and his quiverbearer; in peace, his parasolbearer, and his fanbearer, who was also privileged to carry what has been termed "the royal pocket-handkerchief".

== See also ==
- Forest law
- Hunting license
