= River Hodder =

River in Lancashire, England

Coordinates: 53°50′N 2°25′W

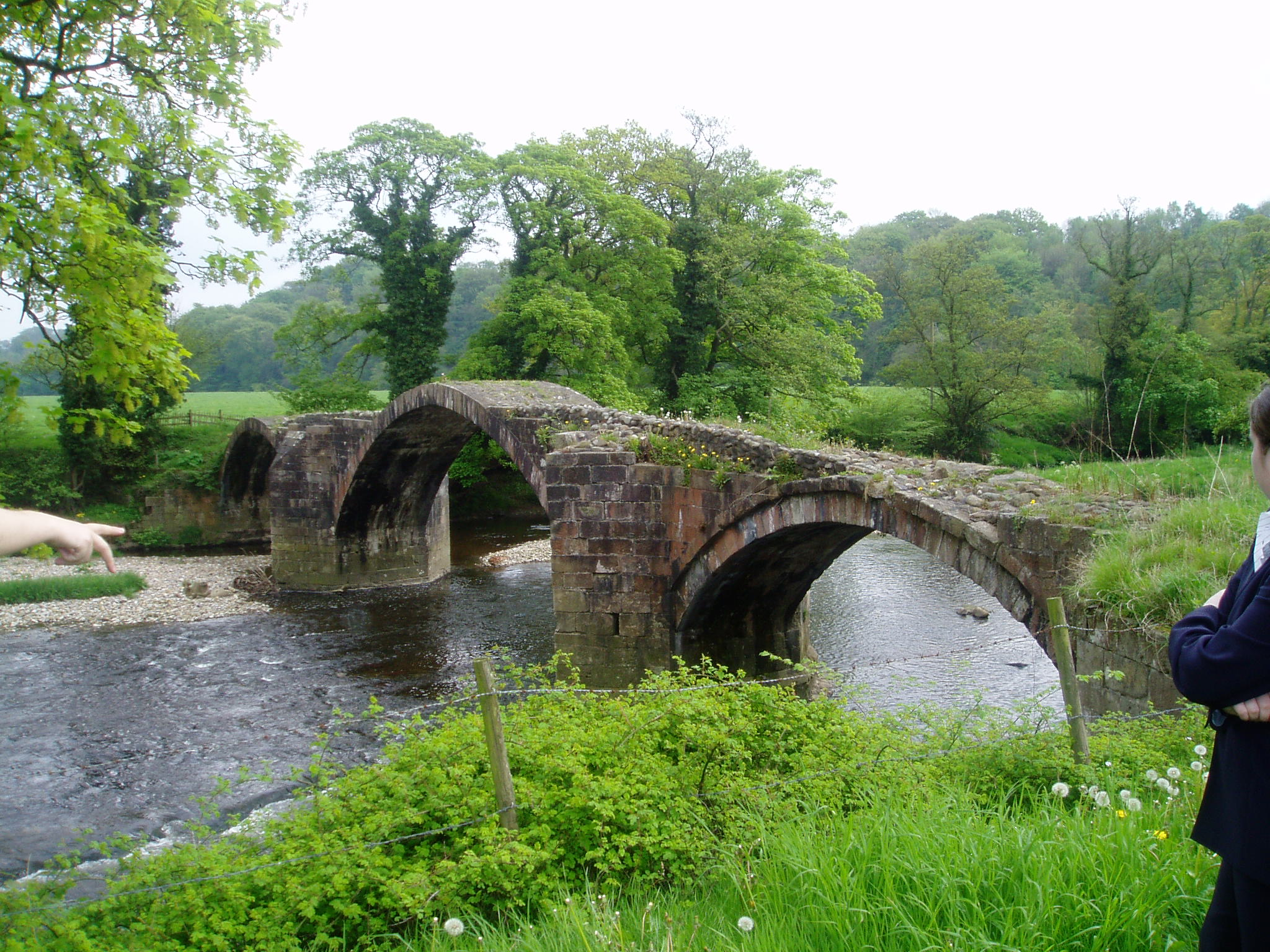
Cromwell's Bridge, near Hurst Green

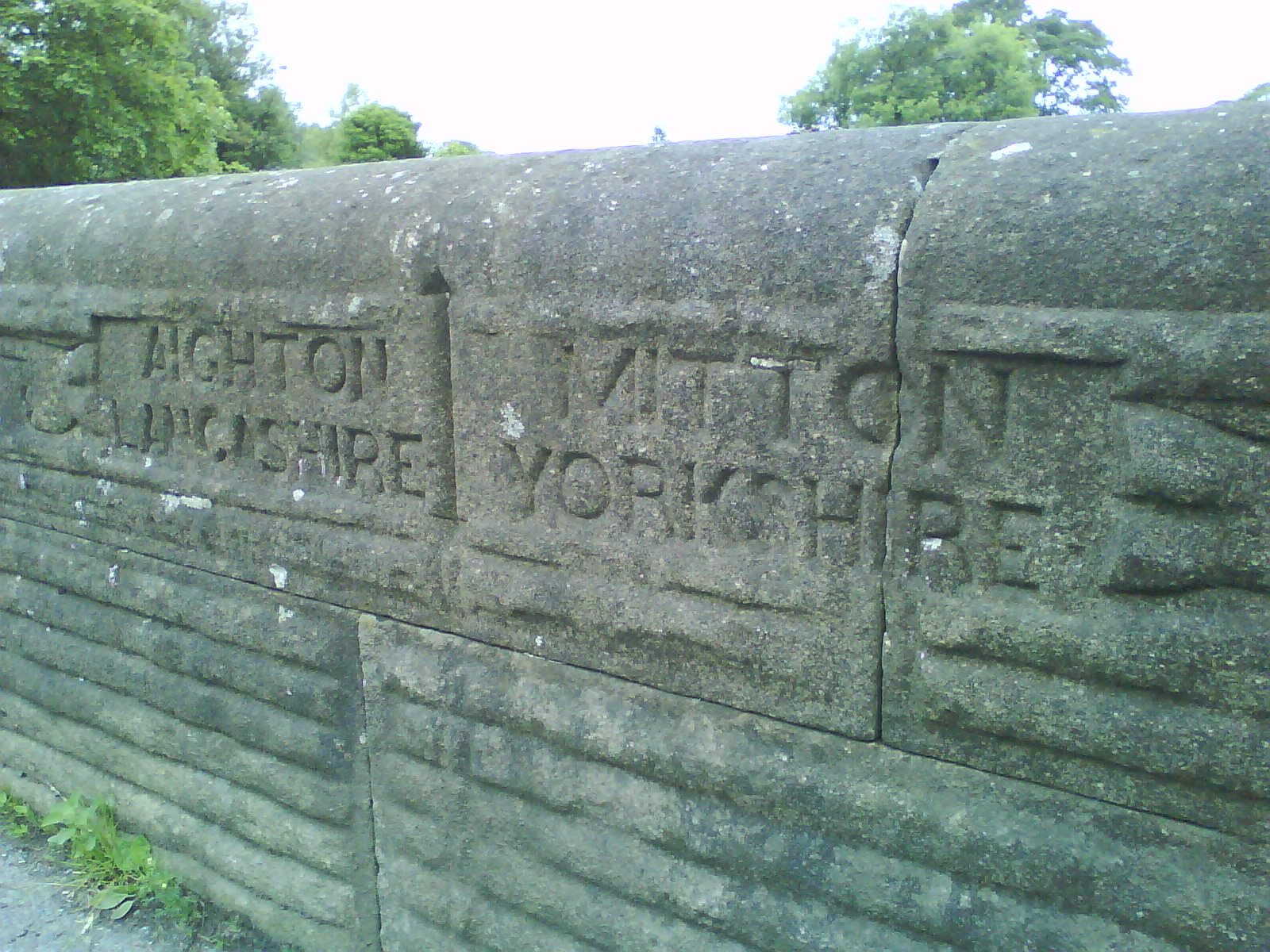
Lower Hodder Bridge marking the ancient county boundary

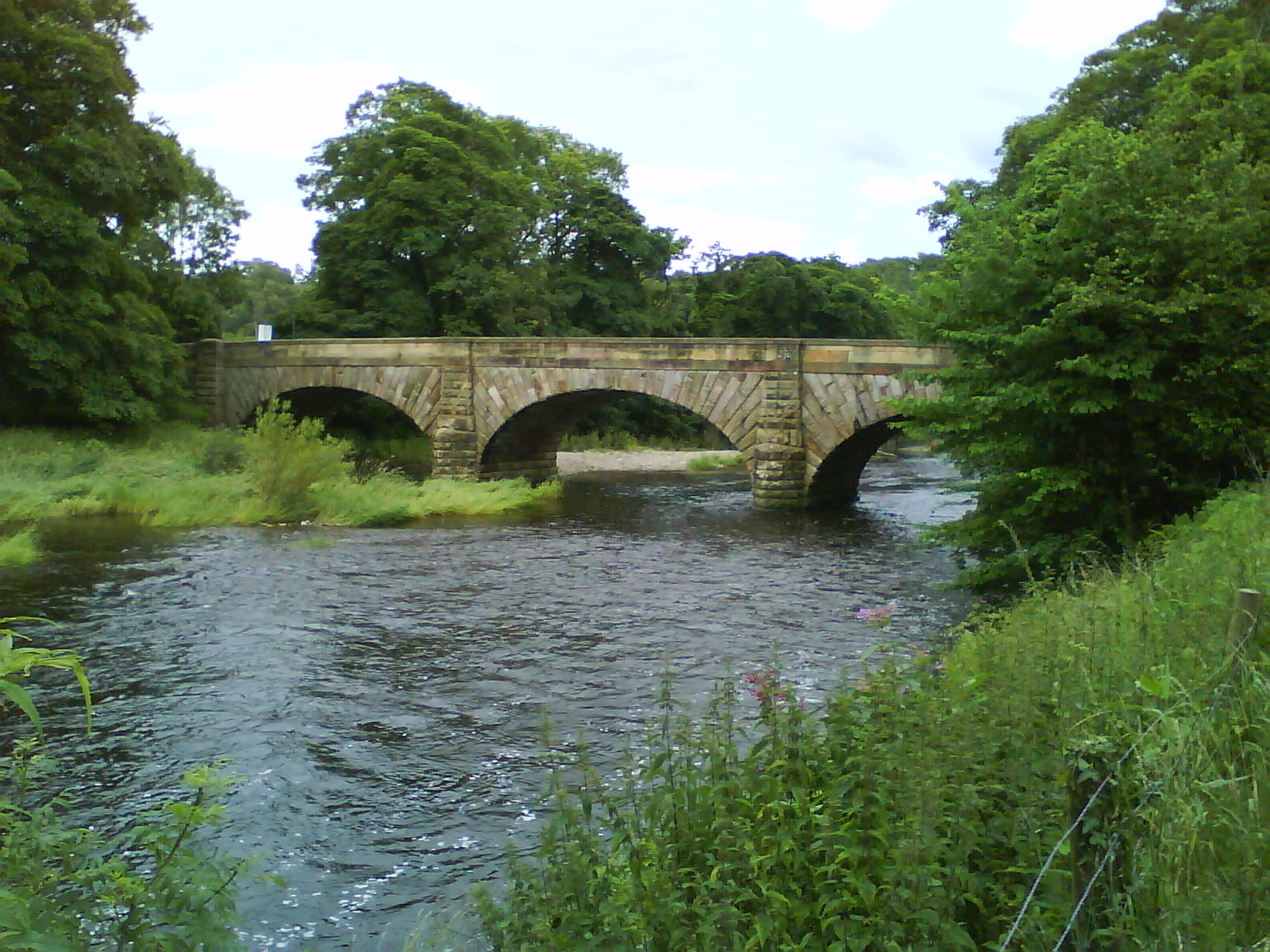
Lower Hodder Bridge from the former Lancashire bank

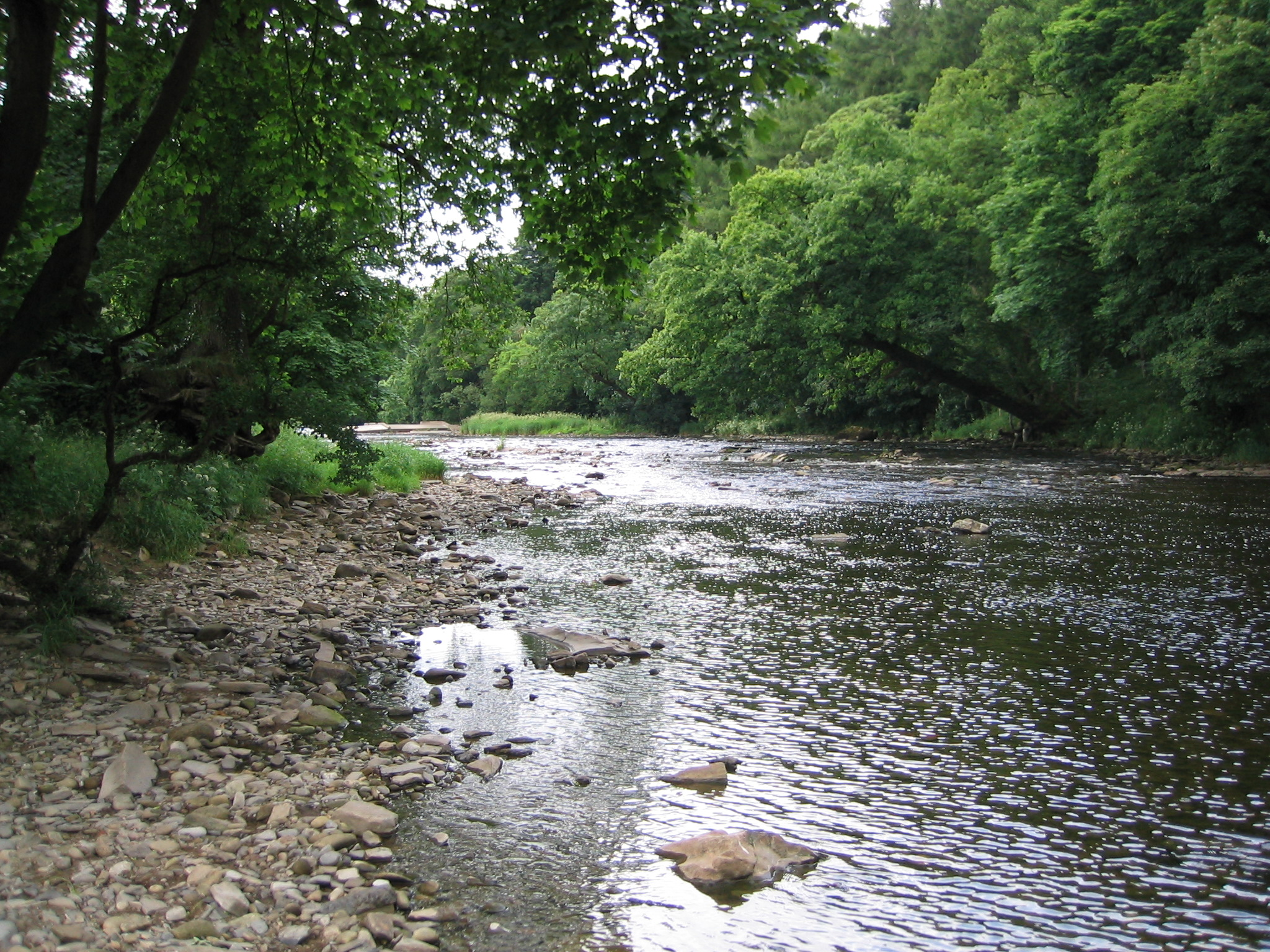
Looking towards the former Yorkshire bank, near Paradise hill

The River Hodder is in Lancashire, England. It is a County Biological Heritage Site.

It rises on White Hill and flows for approximately 23 miles to the River Ribble, of which it is the largest tributary.

The Hodder drains much of the Forest of Bowland Area of Outstanding Natural Beauty and all but the last mile of its course is through this scenic area.

The upper reaches of the river feed the large Stocks Reservoir, which provides water supply to the Fylde coast. After exiting the reservoir, the Hodder continues in a general southward direction. It collects many tributaries from the valleys of Bowland and, lower down, parts of the Ribble Valley. Most notable among the feeders of the Hodder are Croasdale Brook, Easington Brook, the River Dunsop, Langden Brook and the River Loud.

Much of the land in the Hodder Valley further to the north is owned by the Crown as Duke of Lancaster, whilst further down, farming land on the Stonyhurst Estate is owned by Stonyhurst College and the Jesuits. The river runs close to the College and passes adjacent to the former preparatory school, Hodder Place. The river lends its name to the pre-preparatory department at Stonyhurst, "Hodder House" and also years three to five known collectively as "Hodder Playroom".

The River Hodder eventually joins the River Ribble near Great Mitton, close to the River Calder.

The relief of the river starts over 400 m above sea level and within a distance of 15 km it drops to 99 m above sea level.

The Lower Hodder marks the historical county boundary between Lancashire and the West Riding of Yorkshire. It formed an important early feature in the development of the ancient Lordship of Bowland.

== Etymology ==
The name Hodder is likely derived from Brythonic. Its meaning is either "pleasant stream" or possibly "boundary" (Welsh yr odre), the latter suggesting that the Lancashire/Yorkshire border has its origins in the depths of antiquity. It is thought that Bowland takes its name from the Old Norse boga- meaning a bow in a river; the Hodder being characterised by the way it meanders and twists through the Bowland landscape.

== Diversion ==
In geological history, the Hodder did not flow eastward around Longridge Fell to join the River Ribble, but instead ran westward along the Loud valley from Doeford Bridge to the Derby Arms north of Longridge (reversing its modern-day eastward flow), continuing south-westward through Halfpenny Lane on the west side of Longridge to join either Blundell Brook past Broughton church and Woodplumpton to join the River Wyre, or else Savick Brook through Fulwood to join the River Ribble.

== Settlements ==
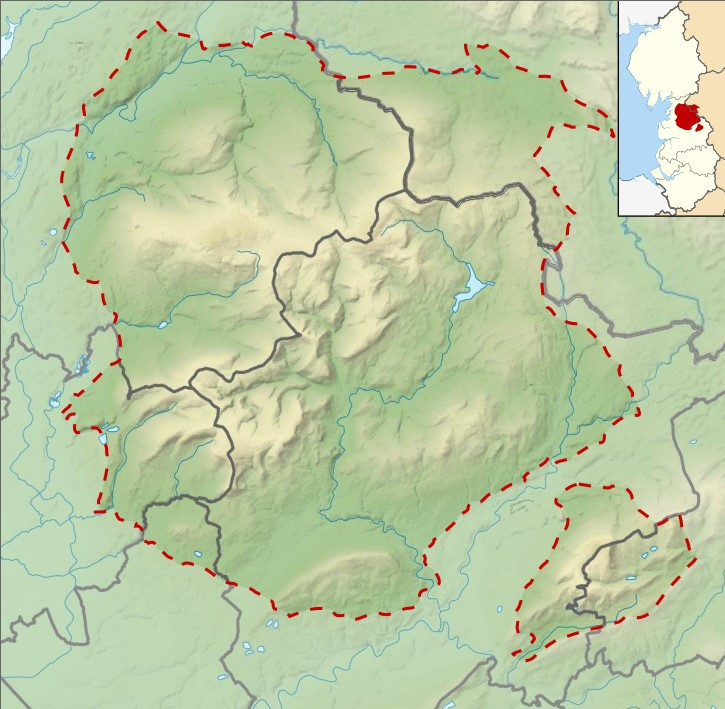
Shown within the Forest of Bowland

The Hodder does not pass by any major towns, but the following villages are situated along the river:

- Slaidburn
- Newton
- Dunsop Bridge
- Whitewell
- Hurst Green
- Great Mitton

The medieval silver Mitton Hoard was found near where this river joins the River Ribble in 2009.

== Tributaries ==
Notable tributaries include River Loud, Trough Brook, and River Dunsop.

Next confluence upstream	River Ribble	Next confluence downstream
Pendleton Brook (South)	River Hodder	River Calder (South)
