= River Dunsop =

River in Lancashire, United Kingdom

Coordinates: 53.945°N 2.516°W

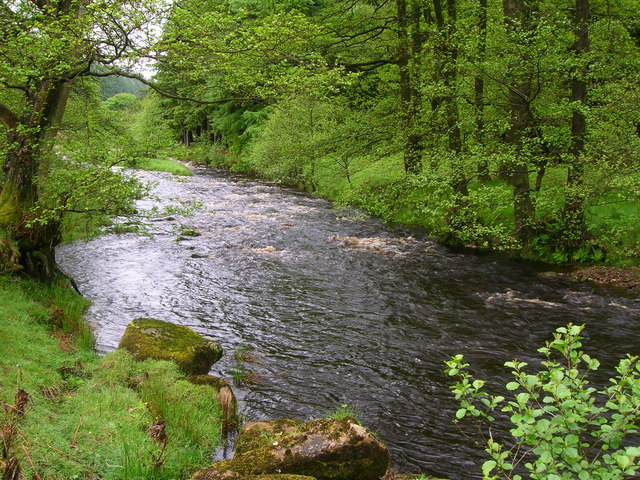
River Dunsop near Dunsop Bridge

The River Dunsop is a river in the Forest of Bowland in Northern England. It flows into the River Hodder at Dunsop Bridge.

It begins at the confluence of the Brennand River and Whitendale River, both of which rise high up in the surrounding moorland. It then flows through the steep-sided Dunsop Valley before meeting the Hodder. An aqueduct carrying water to Blackburn runs alongside.

The Dunsop drains a catchment approximately 9 km by 5 km, which comprises the sub-catchment areas of the Brennand and Whitendale, and is classed as a fifth order catchment. The catchment is primarily Millstone Grit, but the tributaries run through older shale and limestone strata

On 8 August 1967 Dunsop Valley entered the UK Weather Records with the Highest 90-min total rainfall at 117 mm. The peak flow of the flood was deduced primarily from wrack mark evidence and roughness coefficients. As of July 2006 this record remains.

== See also ==
- Dunsop Bridge (structure)
