= Trough of Bowland =

Mountain pass in Lancashire, England

Coordinates: 53.969214°N 2.570829°W

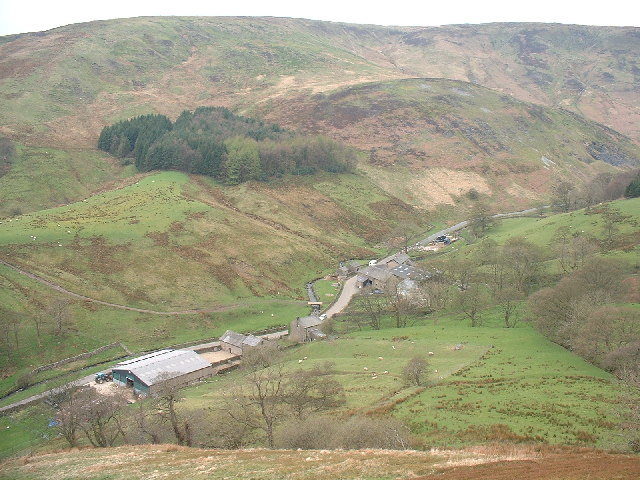
Sykes Farm, Trough of Bowland

The Trough of Bowland is a valley and high pass in the Forest of Bowland Area of Outstanding Natural Beauty, Lancashire, England.

The pass, reaching 968 ft (295 m) above sea level at the head of the valley, links to Wyresdale, dividing the upland core of Bowland into two main blocks. Though steep and narrow, the road is the most direct connection between Lancaster and Dunsop Bridge, and hence Clitheroe. It was the route taken by the "Pendle witches" to their trial at Lancaster Castle in 1612. The Grey Stone of Trough, at the head of the pass, marks the line of the historic county boundary between Lancashire and the West Riding of Yorkshire. Historically, the Trough marked the westernmost boundary of the ancient Lordship of Bowland.

== Definition ==
The Trough is scenic and popular with visitors, particularly walkers and cyclists, and it is sometimes considered synonymous with the Forest of Bowland as a whole. However, it is only a small part of the wider Area of Outstanding Natural Beauty at 312 sq mi (810 km^{2}).

The Ordnance Survey indicates the Trough of Bowland to be solely the steep upper valley of Losterdale Brook above Trough Barn. However, the generally used definition includes:

- the main valleys of Langden Brook and its tributaries, as far as Dunsop Bridge,
- on the Wyresdale side of the pass, the moorland and wooded valley of Trough Beck as far as Trough Bridge; most reasonably extend the western 'boundary' to encompass the rest of the wooded headwater valley of the Wyre as far as Marshaw.

== Land usage ==
The Trough is very sparsely populated: there are only two farms on the Langden side (Sykes and Hareden), and, in Wyresdale, the small community of Marshaw. All feature Grade II listed buildings.

Evidence of past industrial use remains in the form of a disused roadside lime kiln and several quarry scars. What is believed to be the former location of the Sykes Smelt Mill is now the headquarters of the Bowland Pennine Mountain Rescue Team.

Water is abstracted from the main streams of the Trough to supply the city of Preston. Water intakes were built at the mouths of Hareden, Losterdale and Langden Brooks in the 1920s, linked by a series of aqueducts to the Alston Reservoirs near Longridge. The water intakes are now operated by United Utilities from their office at Stocks board house.
