= Bowland Forest Low =

Coordinates: 53.910°N 2.490°W

- Civil parish
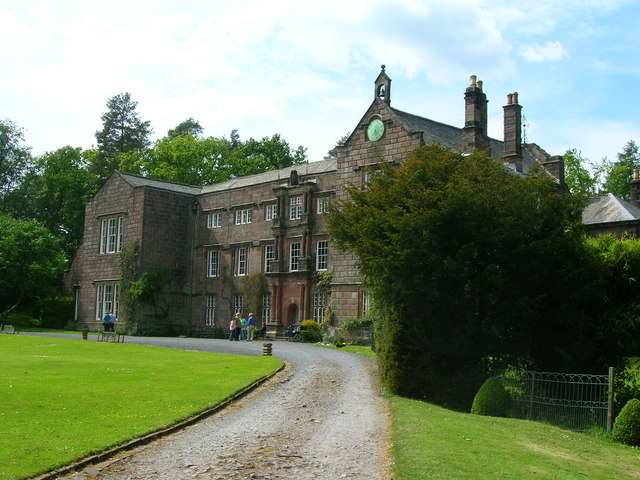
- Browsholme Hall

- Location in Ribble Valley Location in the Forest of Bowland Location within Lancashire
- Area: 18.0135 km^{2} (6.9551 sq mi)
- Population: 160 (2011 Census)
  - Density: 9/km^{2} (23/sq mi)
- OS grid reference: SD675455
- Civil parish: Bowland Forest Low
- District: Ribble Valley
- Shire county: Lancashire
- Region: North West
- Country: England
- Sovereign state: United Kingdom
- Post town: CLITHEROE
- Postcode district: BB7
- Dialling code: 01254/01200
- Police: Lancashire
- Fire: Lancashire
- Ambulance: North West
- UK Parliament: Ribble Valley

Bowland Forest Low is a civil parish in the Ribble Valley district of Lancashire, England, covering some 5,500 acres (22 km^{2}) of the Forest of Bowland. According to the 2001 census, the parish had a population of 168, falling to 160 at the 2011 Census. The parish includes the hamlets of Whitewell and Cow Ark. From northwards clockwise, it borders the civil parishes of Newton, Bashall Eaves, Aighton, Bailey and Chaigley, Bowland-with-Leagram and Bowland Forest High. Before 1974, it formed part of Bowland Rural District in the West Riding of Yorkshire.

== History ==
Historic Bowland comprised a Royal Forest and a Liberty of ten manors spanning eight townships and four parishes and covered an area of almost 300 square miles (800 km^{2}) on the historic borders of Lancashire and Yorkshire. The forest courts for the Forest of Bowland, the woodmote and swainmote, originally appear to have been held at Hall Hill near Radholme Laund before moving to Whitewell sometime in the 14th century.

Lower Lees, near Cow Ark, is believed to have been the centre of a medieval cattle farm (vaccary), although the extant buildings are of 1694 and later. They include Lower Lee House, which was extended in the early 18th- and early 19th centuries by a rear wing which now forms Lower Lees Farmhouse. An eight-bay barn, likely 18th century, albeit with no surviving internal fixtures, adjoins the houses.

For much of the 20th century, experts thought that the Lordship of Bowland belonged to the Crown. In 1938, the Duchy of Lancaster had acquired some 6,000 acres (24 km^{2}) of the Forest of Bowland, now known as the Whitewell Estate, and it was believed the Lordship of Bowland had been acquired with it. In 2008, however, Charles Towneley Strachey, 4th Baron O'Hagan, claimed the title, after a researcher discovered that the 1938 purchase, while including mineral, sporting and forestry rights, specifically excluded the Lordship itself, which had been retained by an extinct Towneley family trust. Strachey then went on to auction the title, which was purchased by a Cambridge University don.

== Geography ==
The Roman road known as Watling Street, which runs from Manchester via Ribchester to Carlisle, passes in a NNE direction through the parish.

The River Hodder flows along the western and southern borders of the parish, and south of Burholme bridge, anciently formed the Lancashire – Yorkshire border.

East of the Hodder is a low-lying area known as the Lees. Nearby, higher up, are Browsholme Moor and Burholme Moor.

== Governance ==
The civil parish of Bowland Forst Low was created from the township (in the ancient parish of Whalley) with the same name in 1866. In 1938, two geographically non-contiguous areas, called Harrop and Countess Flat where transferred to Grindleton and Slaidburn.

TD Whitaker writing in 1818 states: Harrop, Countess Flat, near Slaidburn, part of Burholme, and Browsholme, are within the parish of Whalley; and the same part of Burholme, with Browsholme and Little Bowland, constitute the Chapelry of Whitewell.

Along with Slaidburn, Newton, Easington and Bolton-by-Bowland, the parish forms the Bowland, Newton and Slaidburn ward of Ribble Valley Borough Council.

== Media gallery ==
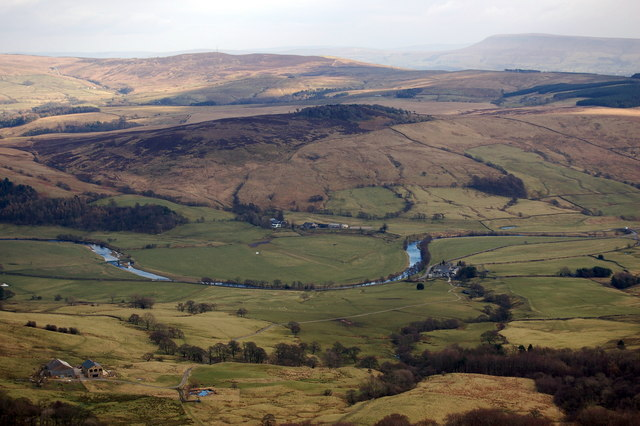
View across the Parish.

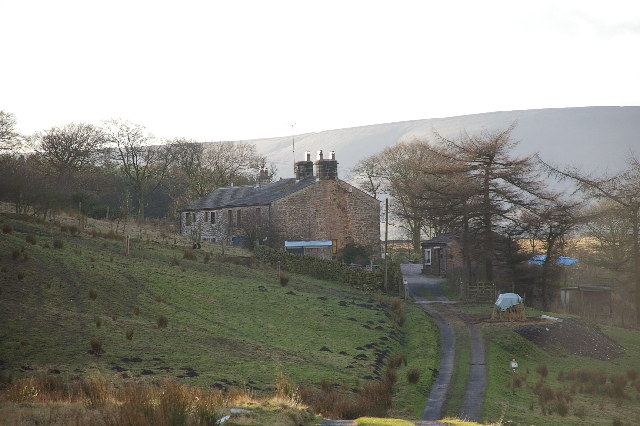
Crimpton Farm.

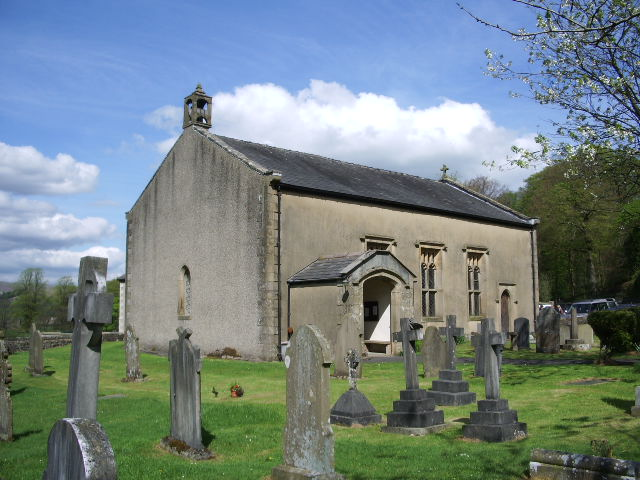
The Parish Church of St Michael, Whitewell.

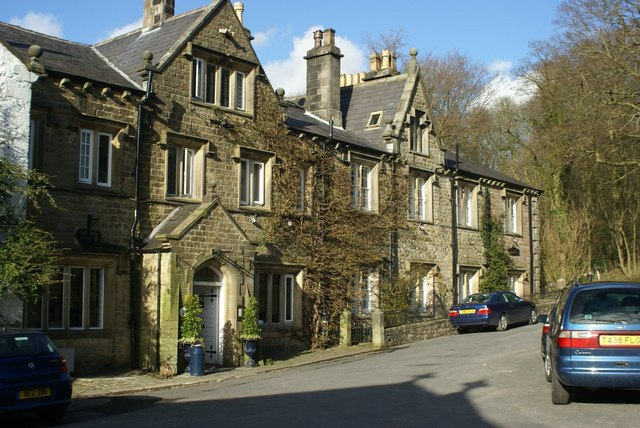
The Inn at Whitewell.

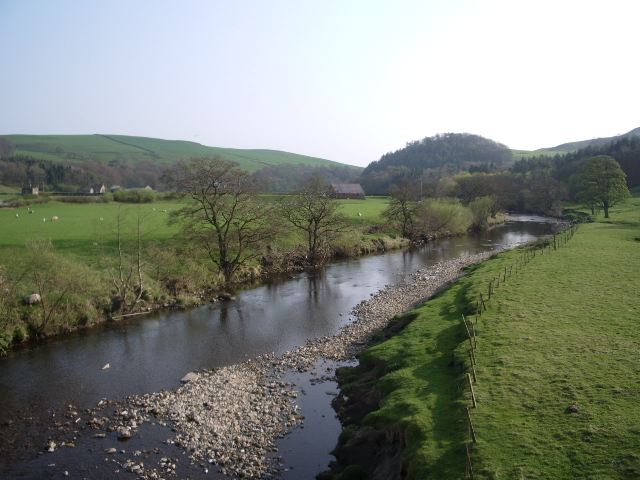
The River Hodder.

== See also ==
- Listed buildings in Bowland Forest Low
- Bowbearer#Parker family
