= Lord of the Fells =

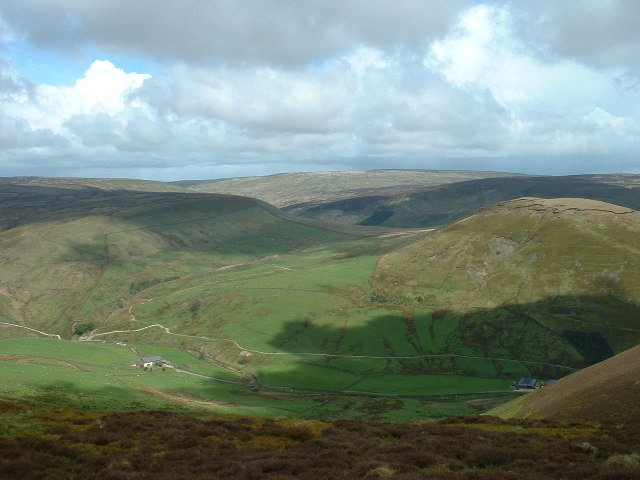
Bowland Fells, historic domain of the Lord of the Fells

Lord of the Fells is a customary title of the Lords of Bowland. The title is thought to have become customary during the high medieval period as a description of the Lords' rugged upland demesne. Bowland Fells, more widely known as the Forest of Bowland, is an area of barren gritstone fells, deep valleys and peat moorland, mostly in north-east Lancashire, England. A small part lies in North Yorkshire, and much of the area was historically part of the West Riding of Yorkshire.

The Lordship of the Forest of Bowland itself was created by William Rufus sometime after Domesday. It may have been a reward for Roger de Poitou, 1st Lord of Bowland, for his role in defeating the army of Scots king Malcolm III in 1091–1092. The Forest and Liberty of Bowland, along with the grant of the adjacent fee of Blackburnshire and holdings in Hornby and Amounderness, came in time to form the basis of what became known as the Honor of Clitheroe.

Like the subsidiary titles Lord of the Isles and Lord of Mann, Lord of the Fells has royal associations. After 1351, the Lordship of Bowland was administered as part of the Duchy of Lancaster, with the Duke (from 1399, the Sovereign) acknowledged lord paramount over the Forest and the ten manors of the Liberty. As lord paramount, he was styled Lord King of Bowland.
