= Dunsop Bridge =

Coordinates: 53.946°N 2.520°W

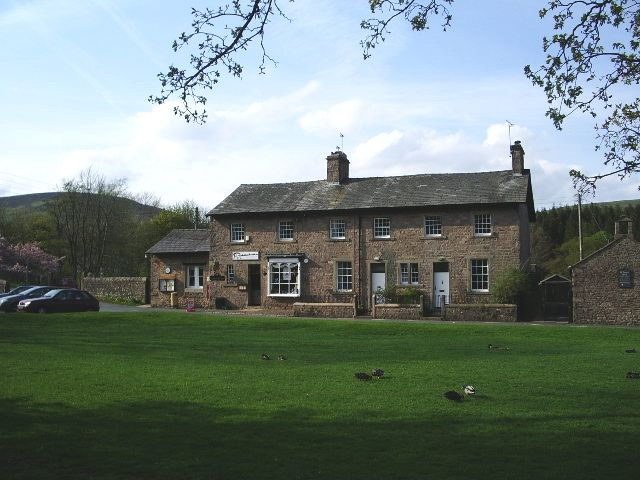
- Dunsop Bridge Post Office

- Location in Ribble Valley Borough Location in the Forest of Bowland Location within Lancashire
- OS grid reference: SD659501
- Civil parish: Bowland Forest High
- District: Ribble Valley
- Shire county: Lancashire
- Region: North West
- Country: England
- Sovereign state: United Kingdom
- Post town: CLITHEROE
- Postcode district: BB7
- Dialling code: 01200
- Police: Lancashire
- Fire: Lancashire
- Ambulance: North West
- UK Parliament: Ribble Valley

Dunsop Bridge is a village in the civil parish of Bowland Forest High, in the borough of Ribble Valley, Lancashire, England, 9 miles (14 km) north-west of Clitheroe, 15 miles (24 km) south-east of Lancaster and 24.5 miles (39 km) west of Skipton. Historically, the village is part of the West Riding of Yorkshire, but was placed under the administration of Lancashire County Council on 1 April 1974.

It is often cited as the geographic centre of Great Britain, although the exact point is at Whitendale Hanging Stones, near Brennand Farm, 4 1/2 miles (7 km) north of the village.

In 1992, BT installed its 100,000th payphone at Dunsop Bridge and included a plaque to explain its significance. The telephone box was unveiled by Sir Ranulph Fiennes. It was designated as a listed building in October 2026. In BT's A1141 list of unique alphabetical Telephone Exchange codes, the code for Dunsop Bridge is DSB.

== Geography ==
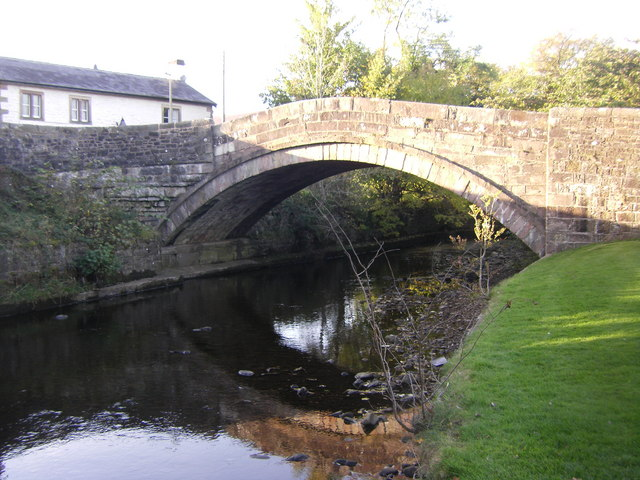
The structure named Dunsop Bridge over the River Dunsop

The village is at the confluence of the River Dunsop and the River Hodder before the Hodder flows south to join the River Ribble outside Clitheroe. The bridge from which the village takes its name consists of two simple arches which span the river.

On 8 August 1967, Dunsop Valley entered the UK Weather Records with the highest 90-min total rainfall at 117 mm (4 1/2 in). As of July 2006, this record remains. The village is surrounded on all sides by the rolling hills of the Forest of Bowland and is located within an Area of Outstanding Natural Beauty. Nearby is the Salter Fell Track, a pass along which the Lancashire Witches are believed to have been taken to their trial at Lancaster Castle.

== History ==
The rivers formed the easternmost boundary of the territory of Amounderness in the 9th century and are cited in a grant made by King Athelstan to Wulfstan of York in 934 AD.

The area is historically in the West Riding of Yorkshire (and was administered by West Riding County Council until the 1974 reorganisation of local government). From the late 11th century, Dunsop was part of the ancient Lordship of Bowland which comprised a Royal Forest and a liberty of ten manors spanning eight townships and four parishes and covered an area of almost 300 square miles (800 km^{2}) on the historic borders of Lancashire and Yorkshire.

Dunsop Bridge developed into a village in the mid 19th century as a result of lead mining in the area. Before that, there were only a few isolated houses and farms. Thorneyholme House, close to the village centre, was home to John Towneley, 13th Lord of Bowland, in the period up until his death in 1878. Before that, it had been home to Richard Eastwood, a breeder of racehorses and shorthorn cattle. Eastwood was land agent to the Towneleys and the last known Bowbearer of Bowland. He died in 1871 and is buried at St Hubert's, Dunsop Bridge.

In 2009, it was reported that Charles Towneley Strachey, 4th Baron O'Hagan, on behalf of the Towneley family, claimed the title of 15th Lord of Bowland. Previously, the lordship had been thought lost or in the possession of the Crown having disappeared from the historical record in late 19th century. The Towneleys had owned the Bowland Forest Estate from 1835 and it transpired that the title had been retained by an extinct family trust. Lord O'Hagan sold the Lordship of Bowland at auction. The 16th Lord of Bowland was revealed to be a Cambridge University don who specialises in the history of Lancashire, its place names and dialects and has ancestral links to the forest. The 16th Lord made an official visit to the village in April 2011. His Bowbearer, Robert Redmayne Parker, was in attendance, together with representatives from the Bowland Higher Division Parish Council, the Forest authorities, community leaders and other dignitaries.

== St. Hubert's Church ==
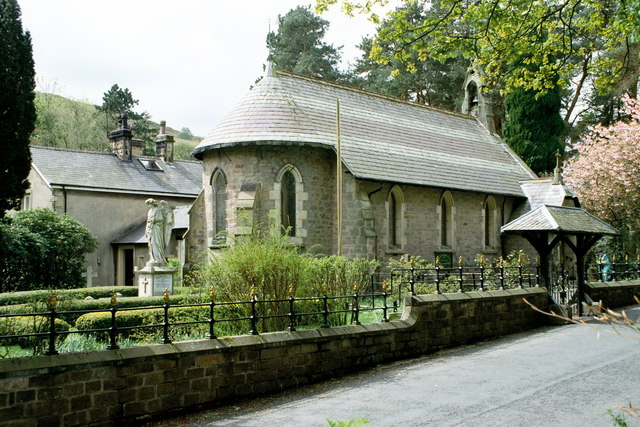
St Hubert's RC Church

The Roman Catholic church of St. Hubert's was built by Edward Pugin for Colonel Charles Towneley of Towneley Hall, Burnley. Local tradition claims that it was paid for from the winnings of Colonel Towneley's horse, Kettledrum, which won the 1861 Epsom Derby. The church was opened on 2 May 1865 by Richard Roskell the Roman Catholic Bishop of Nottingham, becoming part of the RC Diocese of Leeds. In 1988 parish was transferred to the RC Diocese of Salford. The medieval font came originally from the church at Burholme near Whitewell. The stained glass is by J. B. Capronnier of Brussels and dates from 1865. The middle west window depicts St. Hubert the patron saint of hunters. The Forest of Bowland was once a royal hunting forest.

== See also ==
- Listed buildings in Bowland Forest High
