= List of youth hostels in England and Wales =

There are many youth hostels in England and Wales. This article is intended to list all youth hostels operated by the Youth Hostels Association (England & Wales) (YHA), either presently or formerly, and also independent hostels. The list is split into sections: hostels currently operated by YHA, independent hostels, and others, where others include former hostels previously operated by, or as part of, YHA some time since the creation of YHA in 1931. The primary sources for these lists are given in the references section.

The locations of hostels having coordinates listed (which should be just the current hostels) may be seen in linked OSM/Google/Bing map.

== Current YHA hostels ==
This section lists the hostels believed to be currently operated by, or as part of, YHA. This section was up-to-date as of March 2024.

Name	Image	Location Grid Reference	Coordinates	Region (Note: The regions listed are Wales and the nine Government Office Regions of England)	County (Note: The counties listed are the current ceremonial counties of England and the current unitary authorities of Wales)	Year opened	Notes/refs
All Stretton		SO 454 955 (Map: 137)	52.554822°N 2.806626°W	West Midlands (region)	Shropshire	2007	
Alnwick		NU 187 131 (Map: 81)	55.411739°N 1.706076°W	North East	Northumberland	2011	Operated as a YHA franchise by Alnwick Youth Hostel Ltd
Alston		NY 717 461 (Map: 86)	54.808934°N 2.441886°W	North West	Cumbria	1976	
Alstonefield		Gypsy Lane, Alstonefield; SK 136 558 (Map: 119)	53.099043°N 1.798700°W	East Midlands	Derbyshire	2001	In 2017, the YHA sold the hostel to an independent business who continue to operate it as a YHA franchise.
Ambleside		NY 377 031 (Map: 90)	54.419170°N 2.961813°W	North West	Cumbria	1972	
Bath		ST 764 645 (Map: 172)	51.379157°N 2.340667°W	South West	Somerset	1954	
Beer		SY 223 897 (Map: 192)	50.701500°N 3.101095°W	South West	Devon	1962	
Berwick		NT 998 527 (Map: 75)	55.768011°N 2.004699°W	North East	Northumberland	2011	
Beverley Friary		TA 039 393 (Map: 107)	53.839690°N 0.422850°W	Yorkshire and the Humber	East Yorkshire	1984	
Black Sail		NY 195 124 (Map: 89)	54.500346°N 3.244845°W	North West	Cumbria	1933	
Borrowdale		NY 256 143 (Map: 89/90)	54.518760°N 3.150390°W	North West	Cumbria	1939	
Borth		SN 608 907 (Map: 135)	52.496522°N 4.051683°W	Wales	Ceredigion	1953	
Brecon Beacons		SO 073 289 (Map: 160)	51.950526°N 3.350090°W	Wales	Powys	1944	
Brecon Beacons (Danywenallt)		SO 108 206 (Map: 161)	51.876570°N 3.297848°W	Wales	Powys	2005	
Broad Haven		SM 863 141 (Map: 157)	51.784466°N 5.099968°W	Wales	Pembrokeshire	1981	
Boggle Hole	YHA Boggle Hole in the winter, Yorkshire, UK	NZ 954 040 (Map: 94)	54.422785°N 0.531346°W	Yorkshire and the Humber	North Yorkshire	1952	
Boscastle		SX 097 914 (Map: 190)	50.690740°N 4.695582°W	South West	Cornwall	1962	Closed August 2004–September 2006 due to flood damage
Boswinger		SW 991 411 (Map: 105)	50.235406°N 4.818937°W	South West	Cornwall	1933	
Bridges		SO 394 965 (Map: 137)	52.563080°N 2.895520°W	West Midlands (region)	Shropshire	1931	
Bristol		ST 586 725 (Map: 172)	51.449822°N 2.597445°W	South West	Bristol	1988	
Buttermere		NY 178 169 (Map: 89)	54.540418°N 3.271598°W	North West	Cumbria	1956	
Cambridge		TL 461 575 (Map: 154)	52.196688°N 0.135516°E	East of England	Cambridgeshire	1945	
Canterbury		TR 157 570 (Map: 179)	51.271692°N 1.091335°E	South East	Kent	1963	
Castleton Losehill Hall		Castleton, Hope Valley; SK 153 838 (Map: 110)	53.351139°N 1.770957°W	East Midlands	Derbyshire	2012	Previously Peak District National Park education centre
Cheddar		ST 456 535 (Map: 182)	51.277688°N 2.781934°W	South West	Somerset	1953	
Chester (Trafford Hall)			53.243586°N 2.8260407°W	North West	Cheshire	2021	Different location to the previous hostel in Chester
Cholderton Stonehenge		SU 210 424 (Map: 184)	51.180234°N 1.701599°W	South West	Wiltshire	2005	
Coniston Coppermines		SD 290 986 (Map: 96)	54.377599°N 3.095299°W	North West	Cumbria	1932	
Coniston Holly How		SD 302 981 (Map: 96)	54.373310°N 3.075600°W	North West	Cumbria	1950	
Clun Mill		SO 304 813 (Map: 137)	52.424954°N 3.025661°W	West Midlands (region)	Shropshire	1936	Run as a YHA franchise.
Conwy		SH 775 773 (Map: 115)	53.278562°N 3.838888°W	Wales	Conwy	1997	
Dalby Forest		SE 844 900 (Map: 94)	54.298660°N 0.704949°W	Yorkshire and the Humber	North Yorkshire	1978	Formerly known as "Lockton"
Dartmoor		SX 655 774 (Map: 191)	50.580648°N 3.901563°W	South West	Devon	1934	Formerly known as "Bellever" until 2012
Dufton		NY 688 251 (Map: 91)	54.619877°N 2.484206°W	North West	Cumbria	1975	
Edale		Rowland Cote, Nether Booth, Edale, Hope Valley; SK 140 866 (Map: 110)	53.376148°N 1.791024°W	East Midlands	Derbyshire	1945	
Edmundbyers		NZ 018 501 (Map: 87)	54.845396°N 1.973816°W	North East	County Durham	1933	
Elmscott		SS 231 217 (Map: 190)	50.967488°N 4.520579°W	South West	Devon	1949	
Ennerdale		NY 142 141 (Map: 89)	54.514804°N 3.326677°W	North West	Cumbria	1970	
Eskdale		NY 195 011 (Map: 89)	54.398900°N 3.241300°W	North West	Cumbria	1938	
Exford		SS 853 383 (Map: 181)	51.132639°N 3.640911°W	South West	Somerset	1965	
Eyam		Hawkhill Road, Eyam, Hope Valley; SK 219 770 (Map: 119)	53.289222°N 1.672672°W	East Midlands	Derbyshire	1970	
Grasmere Butharlyp Howe		NY 337 079 (Map: 90)	54.462200°N 3.024655°W	North West	Cumbria	1959	Butterlip How
Grinton Lodge		SE 048 976 (Map: 98)	54.373774°N 1.927156°W	Yorkshire and the Humber	North Yorkshire	1949	
Hathersage		Castleton Road, Hathersage, Hope Valley; SK 228 815 (Map: 110)	53.329896°N 1.658796°W	East Midlands	Derbyshire	1970	
Hartington Hall		Hall Bank, Hartington, Buxton; SK 132 603 (Map: 119)	53.140123°N 1.804622°W	East Midlands	Derbyshire	1934	
Hawes		SD 868 898 (Map: 98)	54.303579°N 2.203832°W	Yorkshire and the Humber	North Yorkshire	1972	
Hawkshead		SD 355 967 (Map: 96)	54.361697°N 2.994753°W	North West	Cumbria	1942	
Haworth		SE 039 378 (Map: 104)	53.836840°N 1.942332°W	Yorkshire and the Humber	West Yorkshire	1976	
Helmsley		SE 615 840 (Map: 100)	54.248285°N 1.057220°W	Yorkshire and the Humber	North Yorkshire	1964	
Helvellyn		NY 366 174 (Map: 90)	54.547756°N 2.981393°W	North West	Cumbria	1948	
Holmbury St Mary		TQ 104 451 (Map: 187)	51.194147°N 0.420847°W	South East	Surrey	1935	
Honister Hause		NY 225 136 (Map: 89)	54.511433°N 3.197834°W	North West	Cumbria	1942	
Idwal Cottage		SH 649 604 (Map: 115)	53.123287°N 4.020508°W	Wales	Gwynedd	1931	
Ilam Hall		SK 132 507 (Map: 119)	53.053087°N 1.805223°W	West Midlands (region)	Staffordshire	1932	
Ingleton		SD 696 734 (Map: 98)	54.155057°N 2.467694°W	North West	Lancashire	1938	
Ironbridge Coalbrookdale		SJ 670 043 (Map: 127)	52.635508°N 2.488607°W	West Midlands (region)	Shropshire	1980	
Ironbridge Coalport		SJ 696 024 (Map: 127)	52.618843°N 2.450477°W	West Midlands (region)	Shropshire	1980	
Isle of Wight Totland		SZ 325 865 (Map: 196)	50.677089°N 1.541704°W	South East	Isle of Wight	1975	
Jordans		SU 976 911 (Map: 175)	51.610057°N 0.592401°W	South East	Buckinghamshire	1933	
Keswick		NY 268 236 (Map: 89)	54.602104°N 3.135020°W	North West	Cumbria	1933	
Kettlewell		SD 971 724 (Map: 98)	54.147330°N 2.046590°W	Yorkshire and the Humber	North Yorkshire	1943	
Kings		SH 684 160 (Map: 124)	52.725661°N 3.950776°W	Wales	Gwynedd	1937	
Lands End		SW 364 305 (Map: 203)	50.115914°N 5.688407°W	South West	Cornwall	1939	
Llanddeusant		SN 777 245 (Map: 160)	51.905790°N 3.778570°W	Wales	Carmarthenshire	1940	
Llangattock		SO 215 153 (Map: 161)	51.831097°N 3.140727°W	Wales	Powys	2007	
Langdale		NY 338 053 (Map: 90)	54.438570°N 3.021480°W	North West	Cumbria	1955	
Langdon Beck		NY 860 305 (Map: 91)	54.669200°N 2.218251°W	North East	County Durham	1937	
Leominster		SO 498 593 (Map: 149)	52.229900°N 2.736100°W	West Midlands (region)	Herefordshire	2001	
Littlehampton		TQ 026 020 (Map: 197)	50.808272°N 0.545281°W	South East	West Sussex	2003	
Liverpool Albert Dock		895 (Map: 108)	53.398000°N 2.986300°W	North West	Merseyside	1997	
Lizard Point		SW 703 116 (Map: 204)	49.960124°N 5.203534°W	South West	Cornwall	2003	
London Central		TQ 290 819 (Map: 177)	51.521335°N 0.142441°W	London	London	2003	
London Earls Court		TQ 258 784 (Map: 176)	51.490384°N 0.189243°W	London	London	1952	
London Lee Valley		TL 368 024 (Map: 166)	51.704035°N 0.022321°W	London	London	2007	
London St Pauls		TQ 319 811 (Map: 176)	51.513109°N 0.100406°W	London	London	1968	Formerly known as "City of London", originally "Carter Lane"
London Thameside		TQ 357 802 (Map: 177)	51.504370°N 0.046370°W	London	London	1992	Formerly known as "Rotherhithe"
Malham		SD 901 630 (Map: 98)	54.062513°N 2.152044°W	Yorkshire and the Humber	North Yorkshire	1949	
Manchester		Potato Wharf, Castlefield; SJ 830 977 (Map: 109)	53.475618°N 2.257352°W	North West	Manchester	1995	
Mankinholes		Mankinholes, Todmorden; SD 960 236 (Map: 103)	53.708477°N 2.061909°W	North West	Lancashire	1943	
Manorbier		SS 080 977 (Map: 158)	51.644801°N 4.776360°W	Wales	Pembrokeshire	1987	
Medway		TQ 782 652 (Map: 178)	51.357857°N 0.558034°E	South East	Kent	1996	
National Forest		SK 306 157 (Map: 128)	52.737864°N 1.548793°W	East Midlands	Derbyshire	2008	
New Forest		SU 221 028 (Map: 195)	50.824380°N 1.687614°W	South East	Hampshire	1960	Formerly known as "Burley"
Newport (Penbrokeshire)		SN 059 392 (Map: 145)	52.017354°N 4.830712°W	Wales	Pembrokeshire	1995	Formerly known as "Trefdraeth"
Ninebanks		NY 772 514 (Map: 86)	54.856792°N 2.357281°W	North East	Northumberland	1948	
Okehampton		SX 592 944 (Map: 191)	50.732191°N 3.996212°W	South West	Devon	1997	
Okehampton Bracken Tor		SX 588 939 (Map: 191)	50.727270°N 4.001400°W	South West	Devon	2009	
Osmotherley		SE 461 981 (Map: 100)	54.376449°N 1.291559°W	Yorkshire and the Humber	North Yorkshire	1981	Opened in same premises as original hostel at location
Patterdale		NY 399 157 (Map: 90)	54.532633°N 2.930458°W	North West	Cumbria	1971	
Penzance, Castle Horneck		SW 458 303 (Map: 203)	50.117926°N 5.557929°W	South West	Cornwall	1950	
Poppit Sands		SN 145 488 (Map: 145)	52.106396°N 4.710276°W	Wales	Pembrokeshire	1950	
Port Eynon		SS 468 848 (Map: 159)	51.541374°N 4.209829°W	Wales	West Glamorgan	1950	
Portreath		SW 669 443 (Map: 203)	50.252762°N 5.270809°W	South West	Cornwall	2007	
Pwll Deri		SM 892 388 (Map: 157)	52.007073°N 5.072266°W	Wales	Pembrokeshire	1956	
Ravenstor		Millers Dale, Buxton; SK 153 733 (Map: 119)	53.256286°N 1.772844°W	East Midlands	Derbyshire	1938	
Rowen		SH 747 721 (Map: 115)	53.230980°N 3.879091°W	Wales	Conwy	1948	
Sheringham		TG 160 429 (Map: 133)	52.939587°N 1.212643°E	East of England	Norfolk	1976	
Sherwood Forest		SK 624 671 (Map: 120)	53.197656°N 1.067374°W	East Midlands	Nottinghamshire	1998	
Skiddaw Bunkhouse		NY 287 291 (Map: 89)	54.652016°N 3.106266°W	North West	Cumbria	2007	Premises reopened after being closed for several years
Slaidburn		SD 711 524 (Map: 103)	53.966417°N 2.441575°W	North West	Lancashire	1933	
Snowdon Bryn Gwynant		SH 641 514 (Map: 17)	53.042442°N 4.028061°W	Wales	Gwynedd	1959	
Snowdon Llanberis		SH 574 597 (Map: 115)	53.115312°N 4.132104°W	Wales	Gwynedd	1940	
Snowdon Pen y Pass		SH 647 556 (Map: 115)	53.080876°N 4.020846°W	Wales	Gwynedd	1970	
Snowdon Ranger		SH 565 550 (Map: 115)	53.073296°N 4.143262°W	Wales	Gwynedd	1939	
South Downs		TQ 433 055 (Map: 198)	50.831591°N 0.034021°E	South East	East Sussex	2013	
St Briavels Castle		SO 558 046 (Map: 162)	51.738112°N 2.640796°W	South West	Gloucestershire	1949	
St Davids		SM 740 277 (Map: 157)	51.902160°N 5.286795°W	Wales	Pembrokeshire	1973	
Stratford-upon-Avon		SP 231 562 (Map: 151)	52.203665°N 1.663415°W	West Midlands (region)	Warwickshire	1948	
Streatley on Thames		SU 592 807 (Map: 174)	51.521815°N 1.148734°W	South East	Berkshire	1937	
Street		ST 480 346 (Map: 182)	51.107921°N 2.743768°W	South West	Somerset	1931	
Swanage		SZ 031 785 (Map: 195)	50.606150°N 1.957830°W	South West	Dorset	1950	
Tintagel		SX 047 881 (Map: 200)	50.659850°N 4.764200°W	South West	Cornwall	1947	Now only available to groups
Treyarnon Bay		SW 858 741 (Map: 200)	50.527642°N 5.022908°W	South West	Cornwall	1948	
Tanners Hatch		TQ 140 516 (Map: 187)	51.252025°N 0.367452°W	South East	Surrey	1945	
The Sill at Hadrian's Wall		NY 753 669 (Map: 86)	54.996081°N 2.388306°W	North East	Northumberland	1934	Formerly known as "Once Brewed"
Truleigh Hill		TQ 223 106 (Map: 198)	50.882035°N 0.262730°W	South East	West Sussex	1968	
Wasdale Hall		NY 145 045 (Map: 89)	54.428558°N 3.319706°W	North West	Cumbria	1969	
Wells-next-the-Sea		TF 918 432 (Map: 132)	52.951649°N 0.853195°E	East of England	Norfolk	2002	
Whitby	View of Whitby YHA hostel and its garden with Whitby Abbey in the background	NZ 903 111 (Map: 94)	54.487423°N 0.608271°W	Yorkshire and the Humber	North Yorkshire	2007	
Wilderhope Manor		SO 545 929 (Map: 137)	52.531842°N 2.671818°W	West Midlands (region)	Shropshire	1938	
Windermere		NY 405 013 (Map: 90)	54.403862°N 2.917495°W	North West	Cumbria	1935	
York		SE 590 529 (Map: 105)	53.968511°N 1.102822°W	Yorkshire and the Humber	North Yorkshire	1946	
Youlgreave		SK 211 643 (Map: 119)	53.174997°N 1.686490°W	East Midlands	Derbyshire	1975	

== Independent hostels ==
Hostels currently outside the YHA system include:

Name	Image	Location Grid Reference	Coordinates		Years opened as a YHA hostel	Also known as	Notes
Capel Curig		Plas Curig, Capel Curig, Betws-y-Coed LL24 0EL		Conwy	1946–2010		Reopened in 2010 as an independent hostel: Plas Curig
Diffwys Outdoor Centre		Tregaron, Ceredigion, SY25 6NN	52.203221°N 3.855912°W	Ceredigion	1970–2000		Reopened Jan 2022 as an independent hostel: Diffwys Outdoor Centre
Elterwater				Cumbria	1939–2013		Reopened in 2013 as an independent hostel: Elterwater Hostel
Grasmere (Thorney How)				Cumbria	1933–2011		Reopened Easter 2011 as an independent hostel: Thorney How Independent Hostel
Hareshaw		Woodburn Road, Bellingham, Hexham; NY 843 834	55.145301°N 2.247068°W	Northumberland	1936–2006		On the Pennine Way. Location of former YHA Bellingham hostel (distinct from current YHA Bellingham).
Portreath		SW 669 443 (Map: 203)	50.252762°N 5.270809°W	South West	Cornwall	2007	Left the YHA Enterprise network in 2025
Scarborough		TA 026 908 (Map: 101)	54.302293°N 0.424379°W	Yorkshire and the Humber	North Yorkshire	1936	Left the YHA Enterprise network in 2025
Wooler		NT 991 278 (Map: 75)	55.543716°N 2.015297°W	North East	Northumberland	1954	Left the YHA Enterprise network in 2025

== Other hostels, including former ones ==
This section lists the locations of former hostels, including all those which have been operated by, or as part of YHA, at some time since 1931. The majority of the hostels in this section have closed, but there may be some that now operate as independent hostels that are no longer part of YHA (if any of these are identified, they should be moved to the section above).

Name	Image	Location Grid Reference	Coordinates	County	Year opened as YHA	Year closed as YHA	Hostel also known as	Notes
Abergavenny				Monmouthshire	1933	1937	Pantyronen	
Abergele				Conwy	1938	1946		
Abermule				Powys	1949	1952		
Acomb				Northumberland	1933	2006		
Albury				Surrey	1931	1933	Surrey Hills	
Alfriston		TQ 518 020 (Map: 199)	50.797274°N 0.152371°E	East Sussex	1953	Closed		
Allendale				Northumberland	1937	1937		
Allendale				Northumberland	1945	1966		
Alnham				Northumberland	1932	1958		
Alpheton				Suffolk	1982	1992		
Alston				Cumbria	1933	1955		
Ambleside				Cumbria	1946	1971		
Amersham On The Hill				Buckinghamshire	1934	1934		
Ampleforth				North Yorkshire	1934	1959		
Andreas				Isle of Man	1948	1952		
Anglesey		SH 234 805 (Map: 114)	53.291967°N 4.650924°E	Anglesey	2007	Independent		
Arnside				Cumbria	1946	1978		
Arnside		SD 452 783 (Map: 97)	54.197938°N 2.841910°E	Cumbria	1979	2013		
Arrad Foot				Cumbria	1940	1944		
Arundel		TQ 033 075 (Map: 197)	50.857352°N 0.534234°E	West Sussex	1946	c. 2011		
Asenby				North Yorkshire	1934	1939		
Ashover				Derbyshire	1933	1939		
Ashton Keynes				Wiltshire	1936	1965		
Askrigg				North Yorkshire	1935	1950		
Astwell Castle				Northamptonshire	1935	1953		
Aveton Gifford				Devon	1937	1938		
Awebridge				Hampshire	1943	1943		
Aylburton				Gloucestershire	1944	1948		
Aysgarth Falls				North Yorkshire	1951	2003		
Badby				Northamptonshire	1933	2005		
Badminton				Gloucestershire	1932	1936		
Badwell Ash				Suffolk	1935	1935		
Bakewell				Derbyshire	1966	2007		
Bala				Gwynedd	1933	1996	Plas Rhiwaedog	
Baldersdale				Durham	1980	2006		
Ballasalla				Isle of Man	1946	1953		
Bampton				Devon	1932	1971		
Bangor				Gwynedd	1938	1964		
Bangor				Gwynedd	1965	2009		
Bardon				Leicestershire	1942	1942		
Barnard Castle				Durham	1931	1983		
Barnstaple				Devon	1933	1951		
Barnston In Wirral				Cheshire	1955	1960		
Barrow Hill				Staffordshire	1943	1947		
Barrow House				Cumbria	1931	1931		
Barsham				Suffolk	1952	1952		
Bassenthwaite Lake				Cumbria	1952	1954		
Batheaston				Somerset	1931	1953		
Battle				East Sussex	1944	1944		Hostel listed in 1944 handbook but no confirmation that opening ever occurred
Battlesden				Buckinghamshire	1949	1949		
Bawtry				South Yorkshire	1951	1972		
Beacons Bottom				Buckinghamshire	1963	1963		
Bedruthen Steps				Cornwall	1939	1939		
Bellingham		NY 840 833 (Map: 80)	55.143627°N 2.252522°E	Northumberland	2008	c. 2015		Different location from the previous hostel in Bellingham
Bempton				East Riding of Yorkshire	1937	1940		
Bennetston Hall				Derbyshire	1936	1945		
Bettiscombe				Dorset	1943	1944		
Betws-Y-Coed				Conwy	1945	1983	Oaklands	
Betws-Y-Coed		SH 766 577 (Map: 115)	53.101990°N 3.845089°E	Conwy	2003	Closed		
Bexley				Kent	1933	1933		
Biddisham				Somerset	1943	1951		
Bigbury On Sea				Devon	1944	1988		
Bilsdale				North Yorkshire	1937	1937		
Birdsall Brow				North Yorkshire	1936	1936		
Birley Edge				South Yorkshire	1945	1945		
Birmingham				Warwickshire	1988	1996		
Bishops Stortford				Hertfordshire	1931	1943	Cliff Cottage	
Bishopsdale				North Yorkshire	1947	1950		
Bishopsdale				North Yorkshire	2004	2009		
Bishopstone				Wiltshire	1933	1939		
Blackboys		TQ 521 215 (Map: 199)	50.972822°N 0.165058°E	Sussex	1944	c. 2006		
Blackdown Mill				Warwickshire	1932	1932		
Blackmore				Essex	1935	1935		
Blackton Grange		NY 931 180 (Map: 91)	54.556990°N 2.107840°E	County Durham	1979	2007	Formerly known as "Baldersdale"	
Blaencaron				Ceredigion	1950	2006		
Blaxhall		TM 369 570 (Map: 156)	52.160675°N 1.461941°E	Suffolk	1964	2025		
Bodlonfa Hall				Denbighshire	1943	1955	Bodlonfa Cwm	
Bognor				West Sussex	1935	1935		
Bolt Head				Devon	1932	1934	Bolberry Farm	
Bonsall				Derbyshire	1931	1931		
Boulby Cliff				North Yorkshire	1932	1935		
Boulters Lock				Berkshire	1938	1940		
Bournemouth				Dorset	1936	1936		
Bowbank				Durham	1936	1942	Middleton in Teesdale	
Bracknell				Berkshire	1949	1955		
Bradda Head				Isle of Man	1954	1975		
Bradenham				Buckinghamshire	1964	2005		
Bradwell On Sea				Essex	1950	1969	Bradwell-Juxta-Mare	
Brandon				Essex	1979	1997	Thetford Forest	
Brassington				Derbyshire	1943	1952		
Bratton				Wiltshire	1933	1933		
Breachwood Green				Hertfordshire	1938	1940		
Brede				East Sussex	1937	1937		
Brendon				Devon	1931	1953	Rockford Lodge	
Brentmoor				Devon	1945	1954		
Bretton		SK 200 780 (Map: 119)	53.298809°N 1.700928°E	South Yorkshire	1942	Independent		
Bricket Wood				Hertfordshire	1931	1931		
Bridgwater				Somerset	1935	1940		
Bridlington				East Riding of Yorkshire	1946	1965		
Bridport				Dorset	1933	1938		
Bridport				Dorset	1939	1975		
Bridport				Dorset	1976	1995		
Brighstone		SZ 428 828 (Map: 196)	50.643555°N 1.395457°E	Isle of Wight	2004	Closed		
Brighton				West Sussex	1939	2007	Patcham	
Bristol				Bristol	1949	1966		
Bristol				Bristol	1982	1988		
Brixham				Devon	1939	1944		
Broadstairs				Kent	1992	2004		
Brockweir				Monmouthshire	1931	1932		
Brodenhill				Devon	1949	1954		
Broom				Warwickshire	1944	1968		
Broughton				Northamptonshire	1944	1952		
Broughton Astley				Leicestershire	1940	1940		
Bryn Hall				Gwynedd	1946	1970		
Bryn Poeth Uchaf				Carmarthenshire	1969	1998		20 beds, Simple Non VAT, on a hill, reachable by waymarked route
Bucklebury				Berkshire	1935	1941		
Bude				Cornwall	1938	1938		
Bude				Cornwall	1939	1939		
Bungay				Suffolk	1945	1951		
Buntingford				Hertfordshire	1931	1935	Wayside	
Buntingford				Hertfordshire	1936	1937		
Burley				Hampshire	1936	1954		
Burley Woodhead				West Yorkshire	1945	1970		
Burrington				Somerset	1943	1954		
Burton Lazars				Leicestershire	1939	1939		
Burton Le Coggles				Lincolnshire	1940	1940		
Burwash Weald				East Sussex	1937	1937		
Buxton				Derbyshire	1941	2002		
Byrness		NT 764 027 (Map: 90)	55.318100°N 2.372700°E	Northumberland	1972	Closed		
Cae Dafydd				Gwynedd	1934	1958		
Caistor				Lincolnshire	1936	1940		
Caldbeck				Cumbria	1933	1933		
Calshot				Hampshire	1994	1995		
Cambridge				Cambridgeshire	1935	1938		
Cambridge				Cambridgeshire	1939	1939		
Canterbury				Kent	1932	1939		
Canterbury, Alcroft Grange, Tyler Hill	Alcroft Grange in 1950			Kent	1946	1962		Built in 1880s and designed by Norman Shaw. Position (Y) on 1947 one inch map. Now divided into 4 wings
Canterbury Old House				Kent	1931	1931		
Capel				Surrey	1933	1942		
Capel-Y-Ffin				Powys	1944	1947		
Capel-Y-Ffin				Powys	1949	1951		
Capel-Y-Ffin				Powys	1952	1952		
Capel-Y-Ffin				Powys	1958	2007		
Cardiff		ST 184 789 (Map: 171)	51.502993°N 3.176452°E	Cardiff	1986	2021		
Carisbrook				Isle of Wight	1948	1949		
Carlisle				Cumbria	1935	1940		
Carlisle				Cumbria	1954	1997		
Carlisle		NY 395 561 (Map: 85)	54.895728°N 2.945090°E	Cumbria	1998	Closed		
Carrock Fell				Cumbria	1982	2002		
Cassington				Oxfordshire	1932	1932		
Castle Acre				Norfolk	1987	1989		
Castle Hedingham				Essex	1937	2008		
Castleton				North Yorkshire	1931	1931		
Castleton	Castleton YHA 1954			Derbyshire	1937	2012		Castleton Hall replaced Derwent Hall YHA when that was submerged under Ladybower Reservoir. The Hall and its stables were listed Grade II and the gardens formerly extended to the mill leat.
Castleton				North Yorkshire	1932	1946		
Caton				Lancashire	1934	1937		
Cefn-Y-Coed				Powys	1953	1957		
Cerne Abbas				Dorset	1932	1955		
Chaddesley Corbett				Worcestershire	1945	1965		
Chaldon				Surrey	1936	1965		
Chalfont St. Giles				Buckinghamshire	1943	1943		
Charing				Kent	1931	1937		
Charlbury				Oxfordshire	1946	2001		
Charney Bassett				Berkshire	1944	1948		
Charnwood Forest				Leicestershire	1933	1940		
Cheltenham				Gloucestershire	1931	1931		
Chelwood Gate				East Sussex	1934	1939		
Chepstow				Monmouthshire	1937	1940		
Chepstow				Monmouthshire	1941	1945		
Chepstow (Severn Bridge)				Monmouthshire	1946	1991	Severn Bridge	
Chepstow (Tutshill)				Monmouthshire	1933	1935	Tutshill	
Chesham				Buckinghamshire	1935	1942		
Chester				Cheshire	1933	1933		
Chester				Cheshire	1934	1951		
Chester				Cheshire	1952	1962		
Chester				Cheshire	1963	2009		
Chilton				Berkshire	1935	1935		
Chisworth				Derbyshire	1933	1946		
Cholderton Hill				Hampshire	1954	1957		
Cilcewydd				Powys	1931	1933		
Cilibion				Swansea	1950	1969		
Cleethorpes				Lincolnshire	1957	1961		
Cleeve Hill				Gloucestershire	1937	1995		
Clent				Worcestershire	1934	1957		
Cleobury Mortimer				Shropshire	1933	1936	Styper House	
Clevedon				Somerset	1952	1962		
Clifton On Teme				Worcestershire	1952	1960		
Cloughton				North Yorkshire	1931	1934	Cober Hill Bungalows	
Clun				Shropshire	1933	1935		
Coalport				Shropshire	1998	1998		
Cockermouth		NY 119 299 (Map: 89)	54.656128°N 3.367444°E	Cumbria	1933	2016/17		
Cocking				West Sussex	1934	1935		Men only
Coedkernew				Monmouthshire	1933	1936		
Colby				Isle of Man	1939	1946		
Colchester				Essex	1936	1945		
Colchester			TM 00656 25240	Essex	1949	1996	East Bay House	
Colwyn Bay				Conwy	1955	1996		
Comberton				Worcestershire	1937	1938		
Copt Oak				Leicestershire	1960	2002		
Corney				Cumbria	1935	1941		
Corris				Gwynedd	1962	2005		
Corris (Ratgoed)				Gwynedd	1943	1947	Ratgoed	
Coventry				Warwickshire	1962	1962		Temporary hostel during the Coventry festival 1962
Coverack		SW 783 181 (Map: 204)	50.021776°N 5.096964°W	Cornwall	1976	2025		Sold in 2025.
Cowes				Isle of Wight	1950	1969		
Crafnant				Conwy	1951	1953		
Cranborne				Dorset	1944	1992		
Crickhowell				Powys	1937	1982		
Crockham Hill				Kent	1946	1992		
Croscombe				Somerset	1943	1967		
Cross In Hand				East Sussex	1936	1940		
Crosscliff				North Yorkshire	1958	1960		
Crossthwaite				Cumbria	1931	1964		
Crowcombe				Somerset	1940	2006		
Crowden				East Midlands: Derbyshire	1965	2006		Located in Crowden, Glossop.
Crowden		SK 070 996 (Map: 110)	53.492696°N 1.896420°W	East Midlands: Derbyshire	2007	2014		Located in Crowden, Glossop. Moved 1 mile from former YHA Crowden location.
Croxton				Norfolk	1936	1951		
Cudham				Kent	1950	1965		
Cwm Ystadllyn				Gwynedd	1949	1952		
Cynwyd				Denbighshire	1933	2005		
Dacre Banks				North Yorkshire	1932	1987		
Dartington				Devon	1932	2006	Week, Lownard	
Dartmeet				Devon	1931	1933		
Delamere Forest				Cheshire	1935	1973		
Dentdale				Cumbria	1944	2006		
Derwent				Derbyshire	1933	1942		
Dimmingsdale		SK 053 436 (Map: 119)	52.990125°N 1.923098°E	Staffordshire	1941	2016/17		
Dinas Mawddwy				Powys	1962	1984		
Dirt Pot				Northumberland	1949	1972		
Doddington				Kent	1948	1980		
Dolgoch		SN 806 562 (Map: 147)	52.191029°N 3.747679°E	Ceredigion	1976	Independent	Independent since c. 2007	
Dover (Barnet Hut)				Kent	1931	1940		
Dover (Town)				Kent	1955	1981		
Dover (Central)		Charlton House, 306 London Road		Kent	1966	2007		
Dover (Seafront)				Kent	1947	1966		
Dovercourt				Essex	1975	1975		
Downderry				Devon	1935	1940		
Draethen				Caerphilly	1938	1938		Hostel listed in 1938 handbook but no confirmation that opening ever occurred
Duddon				Cumbria	1934	1944		
Duddon				Cumbria	1965	1984		
Duddon Estuary				Cumbria	1999	2007		
Duddon Valley				Cumbria	1945	1963		
Duddon Valley (Lower)				Cumbria	1951	1955		
Dufton				Cumbria	1935	1943		
Duntisbourne Abbots				Gloucestershire	1946	2001		
Dunwich				Suffolk	1946	1946		
Durham				Durham	1978	1986		
Durham				Durham	1987	1995		
Durham City				Durham	1936	1940		
Durham		NZ 275 421 (Map: 88)	54.773200°N 1.574600°E	County Durham	2012	Closed		St Chad's College; Easter and summer holidays only
Durrell Wildlife Hostel		XD 946 254	49.229571°N 2.075129°E	Jersey	2012	Independent	Operated as an independent hostel.	
Dursley				Gloucestershire	1933	1941		
Earby		SD 915 469 (Map: 103)	53.91817°N 2.13090°W	Lancashire	1955	2016/17		
East Cowes				Isle of Wight	1934	1945		
East Marden				West Sussex	1952	1969		
Eastbourne				East Sussex	1974	2004	Beachy Head	
Eastbourne		TV 588 990 (Map: 199)	50.769104°N 0.250561°E	East Sussex	2009	2025		Rebuilt at the site of the previous hostel.
Easthope				Shropshire	1932	1935	Easthope Manor	
Eastwell				Leicestershire	1933	1938		
Ebford (Exeter)				Devon	1933	1935		
Edale Valley				Derbyshire	1940	1945		
Eden Project			50.3638397°N 4.7494133°W	Cornwall	2014	2024		
Edgworth				Lancashire	1936	1940		
Elkington				Lincolnshire	1949	1954		
Ellingstring				North Yorkshire	1941	2003		picture on Geograph
Elton				Derbyshire	1943	2002		
Ely				Cambridgeshire	1948	1966		
Ely				Cambridgeshire	1974	1986		
Ely				Cambridgeshire	1987	1995		
Endmoor				Cumbria	1935	1942		
Ennerdale				Cumbria	1942	1967	Gillerthwaite	
Epping Forest				Essex	1933	1943	Buckhurst Hill	
Epping Forest		Wellington Hall, High Beach, Loughton	TQ 408 983	Essex	1964	2008		Picture on Geograph
Erwood				Powys	1937	1945		
Eskdale				Cumbria	1933	1938		
Eskett				Cumbria	1932	1951	Ennerdale, Ennerdale Hall	
Euston				London	1945	1945		
Ewden				South Yorkshire	1945	1966		
Ewhurst Green		Ewhurst Green, Cranleigh		Surrey	1936	1983		
Exeter		SX 941 898 (Map: 192)	50.698466°N 3.500559°E	Devon	1939	Closed		
Exford				Somerset	1935	1960		
Fairlight				East Sussex	1939	1940		
Falmouth				Cornwall	1938	1951		
Farforth				Lincolnshire	1935	1948		
Farley Hall				Staffordshire	1937	1939		
Farndale				North Yorkshire	1957	1963		
Farnham				Surrey	1938	1940		
Felixstowe				Suffolk	1936	1945		
Felixstowe				Suffolk	1946	1959		
Fenwick				Northumberland	1946	1954		
Ferryside				Carmarthenshire	1937	1938		
Ffestiniog				Gwynedd	1937	1937		
Ffestiniog				Gwynedd	1938	1995		
Ffynon Wen				Ceredigion	2007	2008		
Filey				North Yorkshire	1938	1940		
Filey				North Yorkshire	1946	1958		
Finningham				Suffolk	1943	1968		
Fiskerton				Nottinghamshire	1937	1937		
Flackwell Heath				Buckinghamshire	1931	1940	Woodspring	
Flagg				Derbyshire	1931	1932		
Fordingbridge				Hampshire	1979	1980		
Forest Green				Surrey	1940	1940		
Forest Lodge				Powys	1934	1940		
Fort Purboof				Hampshire	1938	1939		
Four Marks				Hampshire	1931	1937	Holly Bush House	
Four Marks				Hampshire	1940	1940		
Fowey				Cornwall	1943	1943		
Freshwater Bay				Isle of Wight	1972	1973		
Frosterley				Durham	1934	1940		
Fulshaw				South Yorkshire	1942	1952		
Gara Mill				Devon	1931	1949		
Garsdale Head				North Yorkshire	1949	1983		
Gaydon				Warwickshire	1931	1931		
Gerddi Bluog				Gwynedd	1977	1982		
Gidleigh				Devon	1932	1988		picture on Geograph
Gilsand				Cumbria	1933	1940		
Gisburn				Lancashire	1934	1940		
Glamorgan Coast				Vale of Glamorgan	1937	1937		
Glascwm				Powys	1947	1997		
Glentham				Lincolnshire	1938	1942		
Glossop				Derbyshire	1939	1940		
Godsfield				Hampshire	1933	1938		
Godshill				Hampshire	1931	1938		
Godshill				Hampshire	1944	1944		
Godstone				Kent	1932	1935	Surrey Crest	
Golant				Cornwall	1970	2014		Currently a private house
Goodings				Berkshire	1965	1971		
Gosport				Hampshire	1951	1961		
Goudhurst				Kent	1943	1982		
Goyt Valley				Derbyshire	1931	1935	Errwood Hall Farm	
Gradbach		SJ 994 661 (Map: 118)	53.191745°N 2.010871°E	Staffordshire	1981	c. 2013		
Graffham				West Sussex	1939	1947		
Grange				Cumbria	1933	1973	Borrowdale B	
Grantham				Lincolnshire	1951	1957		
Grantham				Lincolnshire	1958	1986		
Grassington				North Yorkshire	1933	1939		
Great Bavington				Northumberland	1949	1959		
Great Stambridge				Essex	1979	1983		
Great Walsingham				Norfolk	1940	1940		
Great Witley				Worcestershire	1947	1948		
Great Yarmouth				Norfolk	1950	2008		
Greenhead				Cumbria	1979	2009		
Greenmoor				South Yorkshire	1945	1948		
Greens Norton				Northamptonshire	1952	1983		
Gretna				Cumbria	1933	1936		
Grosmont				Herefordshire	1933	1933		
Gwydyr Uchaf				Denbighshire	1931	1954		
Gwynant				Powys	1933	1933		
Gyffylliog				Denbighshire	1931	1953		
Hackness				North Yorkshire	1934	1945		
Hagg Farm				Derbyshire	1973	1988		
Halesworth				Suffolk	1933	1940		
Hampstead Heath		4 Wellgarth Road, London		London	1980	2006		
Hampton Loade				Shropshire	1931	1934		
Hannington				Hampshire	1946	1961		
Hanwell				Oxfordshire	1948	1957		
Harlech				Gwynedd	1938	1990	Pen y Garth	
Harlow				Essex	1968	1998		
Harrowby				Lincolnshire	1944	1950		
Hartington				Derbyshire	1933	1934		
Harwich				Suffolk	1935	1937		
Harwich				Essex	1968	1974		
Haslingfield				Cambridgeshire	1934	1936		
Hastings		Guestling Hall, Rye Road, Guestling		East Sussex	1955	2006	Guestling	
Hatfield Forest				Hertfordshire	1969	1971		
Hathaway Farm				Warwickshire	1931	1931		
Hawkinge				Kent	1952	1954		
Haworth				West Yorkshire	1950	1958		
Hayle				Cornwall	1947	1982	Phillack	
Hayling Island				Hampshire	1931	1931		
Heasley Mill				Devon	1949	1951		
Heath Charnock				Lancashire	1934	1935		
Hebden Bridge				West Yorkshire	1932	1934		
Heltondale				Cumbria	1936	1946		
Hemel Hempstead				Hertfordshire	1933	1951		
Henley On Thames				Oxfordshire	1935	1985		
Heol Senni				Powys	1941	1949		
Hesket Newmarket				Cumbria	1934	1937		
Heys Farm Guest House				Lancashire	1931	1932		
High Flatts				West Yorkshire	1934	1943		
High Halden				Kent	1944	1950		
High Kelling				Norfolk	1933	1939		
High Roding				Essex	1936	1964		
Highgate Village				London	1936	1997		
Hildenborough				Kent	1933	1934		
Hilltop Hostel				Hampshire	1931	1932		
Hindhead				Surrey	1949	2015		
Hockley				Essex	1936	1960		
Hodgeston Hill				Pembrokeshire	1951	1965		
Holbeach				Lincolnshire	1955	1961		
Holmfirth				West Yorkshire	1937	1968	Harden Moss	
Holmpton				East Riding of Yorkshire	1954	1956		
Holt				Worcestershire	1934	1942		
Holyhead				Isle of Anglesey	1936	1939		
Holyhead				Isle of Anglesey	2003	2000		
Hope				Derbyshire	1931	1933	Birchfields	
Horndean				Hampshire	1934	1936		
Horton In Ribblesdale				North Yorkshire	1934	1939		
Houghton Mill				Cambridgeshire	1935	1983		owned by the National Trust
Hull				East Riding of Yorkshire	1979	1980		
Hull				East Riding of Yorkshire	1981	1983		
Hunstanton				Norfolk	1933	1933		Was due to open and appeared in handbook for 1933 but not confirmed if hostel ever opened.
Hunstanton		TF 673 406 (Map: 132)	52°56′13″N 0°29′17″E / 52.936991°N 0.488189°E / 52.936991; 0.488189	Norfolk	1973	2020		Run as an independent YHA franchise since 2011.
Hutton				Somerset	1937	1965		
Ide Hill				Kent	1936	1942		
Idlicote				Warwickshire	1947	1951		
Ilfracombe				Devon	1982	2003		
Ilkley				West Yorkshire	1934	1939		
Ingbirchwort				South Yorkshire	1937	1940		
Inglesham				Wiltshire	1939	1991		
Ingleton				North Yorkshire	1937	1937		
Instow				Devon	1954	1998		
Ivinghoe		The Old Brewery House, Ivinghoe	SP 9450 1613	Buckinghamshire	1937	2007		
Iwene Minster				Dorset	1931	1940		
Jersey				Cornwall	2004	2008		
Jeruselem Farm				Lancashire	1941	1954		
Jevington				East Sussex	1935	1946		
Keld				North Yorkshire	1943	2006		
Kemsing				Kent	1939	2006		
Kendal				Cumbria	1944	1984		
Kennack Sands				Cornwall	1933	1952	Ruan Minor, Kennack	
Kentchurch				Herefordshire	1935	1935		
Kerne Bridge				Herefordshire	1933	1936	Bulls Hill	
Kettlewell				North Yorkshire	1934	1942		
Kielder				Northumberland	1955	1975		
Kielder		NY 632 932 (Map: 80)	55.231858°N 2.579525°E	Northumberland	2002	2014		
Kings Cliffe				Northamptonshire	1939	1965		
King's Lynn				Norfolk	1937	1937		
King's Lynn				Norfolk	1968	2008		
Kington				Herefordshire	1969	1969		
Kington		SO 301 568 (Map: 148)	52.205325°N 3.024400°E	Herefordshire	2004	c. 2022		
Kirby Wiske				North Yorkshire	1933	1933		
Kirkby Malzeard				North Yorkshire	1931	1953	Moordale	
Kirkby Stephen				Cumbria	1931	1980	Folk Hall	
Kirkby Stephen				Cumbria	1981	2011		Became independent hostel
Knaplock				Somerset	1948	1954		
Kneeton				Nottinghamshire	1938	1939		
Knighton				Powys	1979	1994		
Knock				Cumbria	1964	1974		
Knustonhall				Northamptonshire	1949	1949		
Lake Vyrnwy				Powys	1953	1953		
Lakeside				Cumbria	2006	2008		
Langridge				Somerset	1933	1936		
Langsett				South Yorkshire	1967	2007		
Lasham				Hampshire	1949	1961		
Lastingham				North Yorkshire	1949	1959		
Lathkilldale				Derbyshire	1940	1942		
Laugharne				Carmarthenshire	1937	1937		
Lawrenny				Pembrokeshire	1997	2005		
Laxey				Isle of Man	1962	1985		
Leam Hall				Derbyshire	1939	1970		
Leamington Spa				Warwickshire	1952	1970		
Leatherhead				Surrey	1943	1944		
Lee Gate				Buckinghamshire	1964	1983		
Leeds				West Yorkshire	2000	2000		
Leicester				Leicestershire	1970	1970		
Leighton				Powys	1934	1946	Welsh Harp	
Lelant Downs				Cornwall	1936	1940	Lelant	
Lephams Bridge				East Sussex	1931	1934		
Lewes				East Sussex	1933	1947		
Lichfield				Staffordshire	1937	1939		
Lichfield				Staffordshire	1940	1941		
Lichfield				Staffordshire	1944	1973		
Lincoln				Lincolnshire	1949	2005		
Linton				North Yorkshire	1943	2002		
Little London				Lincolnshire	1934	1936		
Little Hawke				Surrey	1931	1931		
Little Witley				Worcestershire	1932	1933		
Litton Cheney		SY 549 900 (Map: 194)	50.707703°N 2.640401°E	Dorset	1937	c. 2022		
Liverpool				Merseyside	1933	1933		Men only
Liverpool				Merseyside	1933	1933		Women only
Liverpool				Merseyside	1984	1984		
Liverpool Central			53.4064095°N 2.9881926°E	Merseyside	2019	2023		
Lizard				Cornwall	1957	1961		
Llanbadarn Fynydd				Powys	1934	1934		
Llanbedr				Gwynedd	1968	2006	Harlech	
Llanberis				Gwynedd	1933	1939		
Llandovery				Carmarthenshire	1948	1948		
Llandrindod Wells				Powys	1949	1950		
Llandrindod Wells				Powys	1951	1958		
Llandrindod Wells				Powys	1963	1966		
Llandyssul Bunk House Barn				Ceredigion	1993	1993		
Llanfair Talhaiarn				Denbighshire	1951	1953		
Llanfihangel				Gwynedd	1931	1931		
Llanfyllin				Powys	1932	1938		
Llangasty				Powys	1935	1946		
Llangollen				Denbighshire	1933	1941		
Llangollen				Denbighshire	1948	1959		
Llangollen				Denbighshire	1946	2007		picture on Geograph
Llangurig				Powys	1934	1934		
Llangwm				Pembrokeshire	1948	1948		
Llanhamlach				Powys	1934	1934		
Llanilar				Ceredigion	1937	1938		
Llanmadoc				Swansea	1935	1946		
Llanrhaiadr				Powys	1945	1951		
Llansannan				Denbighshire	1931	1937		
Llantwit Major				Vale of Glamorgan	1938	1939		
Lledr Valley				Conwy	1944	2001		
Llwyndafydd				Ceredigion	1950	1950		
Llwyn-On				Methyr Tydfil	1931	1937		
Llwynpia				Rhondda Cynon Taf	1983	1999		
Loddington				Leicestershire	1946	1970		
London				London	1931	1932		
London				London	1933	1933		Women only
London (Central)				London	1937	1952		
London St Pancras		TQ 301 828 (Map: 176)	51.528809°N 0.126498°E	London	1997	2023		
London Oxford Street		TQ 294 812 (Map: 176)	51.514819°N 0.136818°W	London	1990	2025		
London (Victoria)				London	1990	1990		
Long Wittenham				Berkshire	1955	1960		
Longridge				Lancashire	1934	1951		
Longsleddale				Cumbria	1937	1940		
Lostwithiel				Cornwall	1950	1969		
Lothersdale				North Yorkshire	1931	1935	Stone Gappe	
Ludlow				Shropshire	1933	1939		
Ludlow				Shropshire	1943	1946		
Ludlow				Shropshire	1947	1999		
Lulworth Cove		SY 831 806 (Map: 194)	50.625090°N 2.240025°W	Dorset	1983	2025		Lease expired in 2025
Lymington				Hampshire	1952	1961		
Lynton				Devon	1961	2007		
Lynwode				Lincolnshire	1945	1946		
Lyonshall				Herefordshire	1951	1961		
Maeshafn				Denbighshire	1931	2004		picture on Geograph - back and front in 1980
Maldon				Essex	1938	1971		
Maldon				Essex	1978	1978		
Malham				North Yorkshire	1938	1948		
Malton				North Yorkshire	1946	1997		
Malvern				Worcestershire	1933	1942		
Malvern Hills				Worcestershire	1948	2006	Malvern (Wells)	
Mansfield Woodhouse				Nottinghamshire	1935	1940	Park Hall	
Mardale				Cumbria	1933	1933		Men only
Mardale				Cumbria	1933	1933		Women only
Margate		TR 342 705 (Map: 179)	51.385120°N 1.364169°E	Kent	1998	Closed		
Marlborough				Wiltshire	1935	1950		
Marlborough				Wiltshire	1951	1966		
Marloes Sands		SM 778 080 (Map: 157)	51.726955°N 5.218742°E	Pembrokeshire	1978	2015		
Marnhull				Dorset	1954	1970		
Marrick				North Yorkshire	1934	1943		
Marsden				West Yorkshire	1933	1944		
Marsden				West Yorkshire	1970	1972		
Marsden				West Yorkshire	1974	1983		
Martham				Norfolk	1968	1985		
Martock				Somerset	1952	1958		
Mathry				Pembrokeshire	1938	1938		
Matlock				Derbyshire	1933	1933		
Matlock				Derbyshire	1983	2007		
Matlock Bath				Derbyshire	1932	1933		
Matlock Bath				Derbyshire	1956	1983		
Meerbrook				Staffordshire	1978	2006		
Melmerby				Cumbria	1934	1939		
Meon Valley				Hampshire	1931	1938		
Micklehurst				Greater Manchester	1948	1950		
Mickleton				Gloucestershire	1931	1946		
Milford				Surrey	1946	1972		
Milnthorpe				Cumbria	1931	1933		
Milton Abbas				Dorset	1946	1967		
Milton Keynes		SP 831 395 (Map: 152)	52.047950°N 0.789000°E	Buckinghamshire	1982	c. 2021		
Minehead				Somerset	1931	1933		
Minehead				Somerset	1934	1939		
Minehead				Somerset	1947	1957		
Minehead		SS 973 442 (Map: 181)	51.187860°N 3.470875°W	Somerset	1959	2025		
Mitcheldean				Gloucestershire	1937	1983		
Monmouth				Monmouthshire	1978	1998		
Mounthooly		NT 882 226 (Map: 74/75)	55.496771°N 2.189125°E	Northumberland	2008	Closed		
Mountnessing				Essex	1941	1941		
Nantllanerch				Powys	1966	1969		
Nant-Y-Dernol				Powys	1952	1987		
Nazeing				Essex	1941	1959		
Nedging Tye			TM 0174 4958	Suffolk	1939	1983		
Nether Silton				North Yorkshire	1953	1958		
Nether Wallop				Hampshire	1933	1940		
Neuadd Fawr				Carmarthenshire	1949	1951		
New Quay				Ceredigion	1970	1990		
Newbiggin				Cumbria	1933	1938		
Newcastle				Tyne & Wear	1969	1975		
Newcastle				Tyne & Wear	1976	1977		
Newcastle Central			54.9732295°N 1.6102266°E	Tyne & Wear	2019	2023		
Newhaven				East Sussex	1984	1984		
Newport (Dyfed)				Pembrokeshire	1973	1976		
Newport (Iow )				Isle of Wight	1973	1978		Temporary summer hostel (July and August only), using two Youth Club huts at the rear of the Old Grammar School, accessed from Lugley Street
Newquay		Alexandra Court, Narrowcliff		Cornwall	1976	1994		
Newstead Abbey				Nottinghamshire	1934	1934		
Newtown				Powys	1937	1940		
Newtown				Powys	1958	1968		
Newtown				Powys	1969	1973		
Newtown (Iow)				Isle of Wight	1935	1940		
Norleywood				Hampshire	1939	1983		
North Newington				Oxfordshire	1933	1948		
North Nibley				Gloucestershire	1951	1954		
North Pickenham				Norfolk	1937	1938		
North Walsham				Norfolk	1935	1939		
Northleach				Gloucestershire	1936	1939		
Norwich				Norfolk	1944	1979		
Norwich		112 Turner Road, Norwich		Norfolk	1980	2002		
Norwich Central				Norfolk	1938	1941		
Norwich West				Norfolk	1939	1943		
Nutbourne				West Sussex	1935	1940		
Oakenclough				Cheshire	1946	1967		
Odiham				Hampshire	1935	1938		
Olveston				Gloucestershire	1942	1942		
Organford				Dorset	1937	1939		
Orton				Cumbria	1932	1936		
Osmotherley				North Yorkshire	1934	1940		
Otby				Lincolnshire	1943	1943		
Otterden				Kent	1942	1943		
Otterham				Cornwall	1945	1965		
Overton		Red Lion Lane, Overton, Basingstoke		Hampshire	1962	1992		26 beds, Simple Non VAT
Overton Hall				Derbyshire	1949	1955		
Oxford				Oxfordshire	1940	1945		
Oxford		Jack Straw's Lane, Oxford		Oxfordshire	1936	2001		104 beds, Standard VAT
Oxford		Botley Road, Oxford SP 507 063 (Map: 164)	51.752897°N 1.266399°W	Oxfordshire	2001	2023		Demolished for railway improvements
Pardshaw				Cumbria	1933	1938		
Parkfields				Herefordshire	1931	1932		
Parracombe				Devon	1947	1953		
Parracombe				Devon	1954	1957		
Parwich				Derbyshire	1933	1935		
Pateley Bridge				North Yorkshire	1947	1956		
Patterdale				Cumbria	1932	1967	Ullswater	
Patterdale School				North Yorkshire	1931	1932		
Peakley Hill				Derbyshire	1944	1961		
Pendennis Castle				Cornwall	1964	2000		
Pendle Hill				Lancashire	1943	1968	Barley	
Penlanwen				Ceredigion	1946	1948		
Penmaenmawr				Gwynedd	1965	1992		
Penrith				Cumbria	1945	1971		
Pentlepoir				Pembrokeshire	1973	2000		
Pentre Cwrt				Ceredigion	1940	1970		
Perranporth		SW 752 544 (Map: 204)	50.346100°N 5.161710°W	Cornwall	1982	2024		Lease ended in 2024.
Peterborough				Cambridgeshire	1973	1975		
Pinkery		SS 723 411 (Map: 180)	51.155158°N 3.827394°E	Somerset	2007	Transferred	Transferred to Exmoor National Park Authority	
Playford				Suffolk	1931	1934		
Plymouth				Devon	1937	1940		
Plymouth		Belmont House, Devonport Road, Stoke, Plymouth		Devon	1947	2001		
Plymouth (Mount Batten)				Devon	2007	2007		
Plymouth University		SX 482 549 (Map: 201)	50.374115°N 4.135794°E	Devon	2012			
Pont Ar Eden				Gwynedd	1952	1961		
Pont Nedd Fechan				Neath Port Talbot	1934	1946		
Ponterwyd				Ceredigion	1934	1946		
Pool Mill				Devon	1933	1952	Yealm	
Port Quin				Cornwall	1937	1950	Port Issac	
Portland		SY 685 739 (Map: 194)	50.563974°N 2.446242°E	Dorset	2007	Closed		
Portsmouth				Hampshire	1961	2006		
Portsmouth (M)				Hampshire	1933	1940		
Portsmouth (W)				Hampshire	1933	1934		
Puckam				Gloucestershire	1943	1945		
Puckeridge				Hertfordshire	1944	1952		
Quantock Hills				Somerset	1945	2007	Holford	
Raleighs Cross				Somerset	1933	1934		
Ramsey				Isle of Man	1953	1973		
Ramsgill	Longside House, Ramsgill in 1972			North Yorkshire	1968	1983		Reopened in 2016 as a bunkhouse for groups only, known as Nidderdale Bunkhouse. An 18th century farmhouse.
Ravenscar				North Yorkshire	1935	1938		
Rhossili		SS 425 881 (Map: 145)	51.569640°N 4.274508°E	West Glamorgan	2007	Closed		
Rhulen				Powys	1946	1948		
Rhyd Ddu				Gwynedd	1933	1933		
Robin Hood Bay				North Yorkshire	1934	1934		
Robin Hood Bay				North Yorkshire	1939	1947		
Rock Hall				Northumberland	1950	1991		
Rockcliffe				Cumbria	1932	1958		
Roman Bridge				Conwy	1935	1957		
Rosebush				Pembrokeshire	1949	1949		
Rosedale				North Yorkshire	1935	1953		
Rossington				South Yorkshire	1934	1940		
Rothbury				Northumberland	1960	1969		
Rothley Shiel				Northumberland	1950	1956		
Roxton				Bedfordshire	1953	1954		
Rudyard Lake				Staffordshire	1933	1969		
Rushall				Herefordshire	1939	1979		
Ryde				Isle of Wight	1936	1940		
Ryde				Isle of Wight	1946	1946		
Saffron Walden				Essex	1933	1939		The 1497 malthouse at 1 Myddylton Place opened as a YHA in 1942 and was sold by YHA in 2011.
Salcombe		SX 728 374 (Map: 202)	50.223036°N 3.783951°E	Devon	1938	Closed		
Salisbury				Wiltshire	1933	1935		
Salisbury				Wiltshire	1936	1936		
Salisbury				Wiltshire	1937	1939		
Salisbury		SU 150 300 (Map: 184)	51.069101°N 1.787714°W	Wiltshire	1961	30 Sep 2015		
Saltburn By Sea				North Yorkshire	1938	1992		
Sancton Grange				East Riding of Yorkshire	1936	1936		
Sandown				Isle of Wight	1932	1932		
Sandown				Isle of Wight	1945	2007		
Satterthwaite				Cumbria	1931	1942		
Saunderton				Buckinghamshire	1935	1935		
Scar Top				North Yorkshire	1940	1945		
Sedbergh				Cumbria	1933	1935		
Sedbergh				Cumbria	1937	1939		
Sedgeford				Norfolk	1950	1951		
Selby				North Yorkshire	1965	1982		photo on Geograph from far bank, photo on flickriver from near bank and description of film about the setting up and removal of Sabrina, YHA's first floating hostel
Shaldon				Devon	1939	1939		
Sharpecliffe				Staffordshire	1946	1954		
Sherborne				Dorset	1985	1985		
Shere				Surrey	1933	1935		
Sheringham				Norfolk	1946	1975		
Sherston				Wiltshire	1939	1939		
Shining Cliff				Derbyshire	1947	2007		
Shipton Downs				Oxfordshire	1933	1939		
Shortwood Lodge				Northamptonshire	1939	1939		
Shorwell				Isle of Wight	1972	1983		
Shotwick				Cheshire	1931	1931		
Shrewsbury				Shropshire	1932	1938		
Shrewsbury		SJ 505 120	52.703525°N 2.732932°W	Shropshire	1938	2003		
Simonsbath				Somerset	1947	1948		
Sisserverness				Hertfordshire	1931	1931		
Skiddaw House				Cumbria	1987	2002		
Slaidburn		SD 711 524 (Map: 103)	53.966417°N 2.441575°W	Lancashire	1933	2025		Lease expired 2025
Slimbridge				Gloucestershire	1970	2008		
Soberton				Hampshire	1938	1949		
Solva				Pembrokeshire	1994	2000	Penycwm	
South Kensington				London	2005	2006		
South Wingfield				Derbyshire	1946	1949		
Southampton				Hampshire	1952	1993		
Southampton				Hampshire	1938	1939		Men only
Southampton				Hampshire	1938	1951		Women only
Southwell				Nottinghamshire	1944	1965		
Speen				Buckinghamshire	1937	1955		
Spiceland				Devon	1943	1946		
St Albans				Hertfordshire	1957	1978		
St Albans				Hertfordshire	1982	1990		
St Athan				Vale of Glamorgan	1931	1937		
St Athan				Vale of Glamorgan	1947	1948		
St Athan				Vale of Glamorgan	1962	1988	West Aberthaw	
St Audries				Somerset	1931	1936		
St Bees				Cumbria	1937	1956		
St Davids Head				Pembrokeshire	1950	1972		
St Mawes				Cornwall	1933	1937		
Staindale				North Yorkshire	1947	1968		
Stainforth				North Yorkshire	1945	2007		
Stainton				Cumbria	1940	1951		
Staithes				North Yorkshire	1936	1936		
Staithes				North Yorkshire	1943	1943		
Stalisfield Green				Kent	1938	1940		
Staple Oak				Lancashire	1931	1932		
Start Bay				Devon	1956	1990	Strete	
Staunton On Wye				Herefordshire	1963	1990		
Steeple Ashton				Wiltshire	1934	1940		
Steps Bridge				Devon	1936	2006	Dunsford	
Steyning				West Sussex	1936	1940		
Stockheath				Hampshire	1950	1952		
Stockley				Wiltshire	1939	1939		
Stokesley				North Yorkshire	1933	1936		
Stoneleigh				Warwickshire	1933	1937		
Stony Stratford				Buckinghamshire	1939	1946		
Storey Arms				Powys	1939	1971		
Stour Valley		TM 120 339 (Map: 155)	51.963318°N 1.083875°E	Suffolk	2007	2017		
Stout Hall				Swansea	1937	1937		
Stouthall				Swansea	1994	1998		
Stow on the Wold		SX 728 374 (Map: 202)	50.223036°N 3.783951°E	Gloucestershire	1935	Closed		
Stratford				Warwickshire	1932	1946		
Stroud				Gloucestershire	1931	1932		
Stroud				Gloucestershire	1939	1939		
Sun Patch				Surrey	1931	1931		
Sutton Veny				Wiltshire	1939	1945		
Swanage				Dorset	1939	1944		
Swindale				Cumbria	1938	1946		
Swindon				Wiltshire	1939	1939		
Taliesin				Ceredigion	1935	1945		
Tangland Castle				Surrey	1931	1932		
Tavistock				Devon	1950	1982		
Tealby				Lincolnshire	1933	1935		
Tebay				Cumbria	1986	1998		
Telscombe		TQ 405 033 (Map: 198)	50.812445°N 0.006569°E	East Sussex	1979	2015		
Temple Guiting				Gloucestershire	1947	1947		
Templecombe				Somerset	1932	1934		
Tharston				Norfolk	1933	1949		
Thaxted				Essex	1942	1942		
The Briary				Buckinghamshire	1932	1932		
The Hermitage				Isle of Wight	1935	1938	Whitwell	
The Ridgeway				Oxfordshire	1987	2007		
Thetford Bridge				Norfolk	1955	1961		
Thetford Bridge				Norfolk	1965	1970		
Thirlmere				Cumbria	1970	2001		
Thixendale				North Yorkshire	1971	1999		
Thorndon Cross				Devon	1935	1940		
Thornton Dale				North Yorkshire	1935	1939		
Thurlby		TF 100 169 (Map: 130)	52.738278°N 0.371507°E	Lincolnshire	1981	c. 2022		Sold to Lincolnshire County Council and run as a YHA franchise c. 2002 to c. 2022.
Thursley				Surrey	1931	1935	Ridgeway Farm	
Tickhill				Staffordshire	1941	1949	Ridgeway Hill, Cuckoo Hall	
Tillingbourne				Surrey	1949	1952		
Tiltups End				Gloucestershire	1946	1950		
Trawsfynydd				Gwynedd	1934	1934		
Trealaw				Rhondda Cynon Taf	1931	1946	Mid Rhondda	
Trefin				Pembrokeshire	1968	2006	Trevine	
Trevellas				Cornwall	1951	1954		
Triggabrown				Cornwall	1934	1941		
Truro				Cornwall	1952	1966		
Tuxford				Nottinghamshire	1938	1938		
Twickenham				London	1933	1933		
Twyford				Berkshire	1933	1938		
Tyncornel		SN 751 535 (Map: 147)	52.165525°N 3.828126°E	Ceredigion	1967	Independent	Independent since 2006	
Ulverston				Cumbria	1951	1956		
Union Mills				Isle of Man	1952	1961		
Upper Chapel				Powys	1935	1945		
Upper Midway				Staffordshire	1933	1933		
Usk				Monmouthshire	1933	1940		
Van				Powys	1936	1956	Llanidloes	
Vernham Dean				Hampshire	1937	1940		
Wacton				Norfolk	1950	1951		
Wades Mill				Hertfordshire	1931	1935		
Waggoners Wells				Surrey	1933	1943	Liphook	
Wainfleet				Lincolnshire	1940	1946		
Wainstalls				West Yorkshire	1935	1949	Luddenden Dean	
Wallington				Northumberland	1931	1955	Cambo	
Walmersley				Greater Manchester	1931	1931		
Walsingham				Norfolk	1937	1938		
Walsingham				Norfolk	1970	1983		
Wandon				Staffordshire	1944	1970		
Warwick				Warwickshire	1936	1947		
Wastwater				Cumbria	1937	1968	Nether Wasdale	
Watlington				Oxfordshire	1932	1940		
Welwyn Garden City				Hertfordshire	1934	1937		
West Hill				Devon	1937	1960	Ottery St Mary	
West Hoathly				West Sussex	1953	1955		
West Hythe				Kent	1937	1939		
West Wellow				Hampshire	1936	1945		
West Winch				Norfolk	1953	1951		
West Yarde				Devon	1934	1946		
Westerdale Hall				North Yorkshire	1947	1992		
Westfield				Gloucestershire	1932	1935	Notgrove	
Weston				Berkshire	1934	1940		
Westward Ho!				Devon	1938	1940		
Westward Ho!		SS 431 290 (Map: 180)	51.038784°N 4.239671°E	Devon	2009	Closed		
Wharram				North Yorkshire	1933	1945		
Wheal Kitty				Cornwall	1937	1940	St Agnes	
Wheathill				Shropshire	1948	1998		
Wheeldale				North Yorkshire	1948	1999		
Wheeler End				Buckinghamshire	1943	1946		
Whissendine				Rutland	1933	1958		
Whitby		NZ 90177 11202	54.4882°N 0.609463°W	North Yorkshire	1931	2007		Located in building with wikidata item Q17526216
Whitebrook				Monmouthshire	1931	1947		
Whitehart Lane				London	1945	1991		
Whitemeadows				Derbyshire	1945	1954		
Whitwell				Isle of Wight	1947	1992		
Whitwell (Herts)				Hertfordshire	1942	1964		
Wholehope				Northumberland	1950	1965		
Winchester	1972 City Mill YHA and bridge, Winchester			Hampshire	1931	2005		There was a mill on this site from at least 932AD. The present Winchester City Mill was rebuilt in 1744.
Windgather Cottage	YHA in 1986 below Windgather Rocks			Derbyshire	1939	1983		Map, opening notice and photos
Windsor				Berkshire	1954	1957		
Windsor				Berkshire	1959	1960		
Windsor				Berkshire	1961	1961		
Windsor				Berkshire	1963	2002		
Winyards Gap				Dorset	1950	1960		
Wirksworth				Derbyshire	1941	1951		
Wisbech				Cambridgeshire	1993	1993		
Witcombe				Gloucestershire	1933	1943		
Witheridge				Somerset	1933	1952		
Wolsingham				Durham	1949	1955		
Wood Green				London	1987	1991		
Woody's Top		TF 334 783 (Map: 122)	53.284560°N 0.000170°E	Lincolnshire	1949	c. 2016		
Woodlands Camp				Kent	1931	1933		
Wookey Hole				Somerset	1931	1941		
Wooler				Northumberland	1932	1940		
Wootton				Isle of Wight	1932	1933		
Wootton				Isle of Wight	1970	1970		
Wootton Bridge				Isle of Wight	1973	1988		
Wray Castle				Cumbria	1931	1932		
Wrotham Heath				Kent	1931	1935	Sandy Wood Farm	
Wye Valley		SO 591 177 (Map: 162)	51.856629°N 2.594785°W	Herefordshire	1937	2024	Welsh Bicknor	
Wymeswold				Leicestershire	1939	1946		
Yalding				Kent	1932	1937	Buston Manor	
Yarmouth				Isle of Wight	1972	1983		
York					1934	1944		
York				North Yorkshire	1945	1945		
Youlgreave				Derbyshire	1935	1935		
Yoxhall				Staffordshire	1950	1953		
Ystradfellte				Powys	1948	2005		
Ystumtuen			Google Map position	Ceredigion	1961	1999		

== Source material ==
- Neal, Tim; Neal, Simon (1993). Youth Hostels of England and Wales 1931-1993. St Albans: YHA. ISBN 0-9522254-0-9.
- The individual YHA Handbooks issued annually between 1931 and 2002 and biennially since 2003.
