= Listed buildings in Slaidburn =

Slaidburn is a civil parish in Ribble Valley, Lancashire, England. It contains 50 listed buildings that are recorded in the National Heritage List for England. Of these, one is listed at Grade I, the highest of the three grades, two are at Grade II*, the middle grade, and the others are at Grade II, the lowest grade. The parish contains the village of Slaidburn and surrounding countryside. Most of the listed buildings are houses and associated structures, or farmhouses and farm buildings, many of which are within the village. The other listed buildings include a church and structures in the churchyard, two cross bases, a public house, three bridges, a youth hostel, a guidepost, and a war memorial.

== Key ==
Grade	Criteria
I	Buildings of exceptional interest, sometimes considered to be internationally important
II*	Particularly important buildings of more than special interest
II	Buildings of national importance and special interest

== Buildings ==
Name and location	Photograph	Date	Notes	Grade
Cross base 53.97769°N 2.45834°W	—	Medieval (probable)	The cross base stands at a road junction. It is in sandstone and has an irregular shape. On the top is a rectangular socket.	II
Cross base 53.96618°N 2.43674°W	—	Medieval (probable)	The cross base stands close to New Bridge. It is in sandstone and has a rectangular section and a rectangular socket. It is thought to be the base of a former village cross that stood elsewhere.	II
St Andrew's Church; 53.96422°N 2.44352°W		15th century	The church is in sandstone with a stone-slate roof. It consists of a nave and a chancel under a continuous roof, a clerestory, aisles, a north porch, and a west tower. The tower has five stages with angle buttresses, a west doorway and window, two niches, and a plain solid parapet. Inside the church is fine woodwork, including the pews, some of which are box pews, the five-decker pulpit with a sounding board, and the rood screen.	I
Cross shaft 53.96430°N 2.44367°W	—	16th century (probable)	The cross shaft is in the churchyard of St Andrew's Church. It is in sandstone, and is rectangular in plan with chamfered sides. There are carvings on all four sides, those on the east side are mutilated.	II
Hark to Bounty; 53.96692°N 2.44163°W		Early 17th century	A public house in sandstone with a slate roof. Most of the windows are sashes. The oldest part, to the right, has three doorways with Tudor arched heads. To the left of these is a flight of external steps, with an attached mounting block, leading to a first floor doorway. To the left is a portion dating from the 18th century, in two storeys with an attic and two bays, and to the left of this are former stables, now incorporated unto the public house.	II
Former stable, 27 Church Street; 53.96495°N 2.44303°W	—	Late 17th century (possible)	Originally a stable, it has since been used as a store. The building is in stone with a slate roof, and has two storeys and two bays. The doorway has a chamfered left jamb and a wooden lintel. The ground floor window has a chamfered surround, and the upper floor window has three lights with mullions. At the rear is a doorway, and a window with a re-set shaped lintel.	II
Knott Gate; 53.96734°N 2.44401°W		Late 17th century (probable)	A house, incorporating a former farm building, in stone with a slate roof. There are two storeys and two bays. Most of the windows are mullioned, and there is one sash window. On the right is a flight of external stone steps leading to a first floor doorway. There is also a former pitching hole that has been converted into a window.	II
Ellerbeck Hall; 53.97016°N 2.45798°W		1694	A pebbledashed house with a stone-slate roof, in two storeys with an attic. It consists of a main range, a cross wing, and a porch wing. The windows are mullioned, or mullioned and transomed, and there is one modern window. The doorway has a moulded surround and a shaped lintel. Above it is an inscribed plaque, and a hood mould rises over the doorway and the plaque.	II
Rock House and barn 53.96776°N 2.44331°W		1707	The house and barn are rendered with sandstone dressings and a slate roof. The oldest part is the barn, which contains a wide entrance with a segmental head, a sash window, and a doorway with a chamfered surround. The house dates from the early 19th century and has a symmetrical front of two storeys with attics, and three bays. The windows are sashes, and there is a dormer in the attic. The doorway has a wooden portico with Tuscan columns and a pediment.	II
Brennand's Endowed School; 53.96454°N 2.44306°W		Early 18th century	The school is in limestone with sandstone dressings and a stone-slate roof, and has two storeys. The west front is symmetrical with seven bays and rusticated quoins. The windows are cross windows, and the central window in the upper floor has a head carved on in the lintel. The central doorway has an architrave with a head carved on the lintel, fluted pilasters, and an open segmental pediment. At the rear is a single-storey two-bay wing.	II*
Merrybent Hill; 54.00614°N 2.44431°W	—	Early 18th century (possible)	A stone house with a slate roof, in two storeys and two bays. The three-light windows have chamfered surrounds and mullions. There is a central single-storey porch that has a plain doorway with an roughly carved lintel. To the left is an extension, and there is an outshut at the rear.	II
Townhead; 53.96891°N 2.44312°W		Early 18th century (probable)	A country house in limestone, partly pebbledashed, with sandstone dressings and a hipped stone-slate roof. It has three storeys, the south and east fronts have five bays, and the north face has six. On the west side is a two-storey service wing. The windows are sashes. On the south front is a doorcase with Tuscan pilasters, a triglyph frieze that has guttae and metopes decorated with flower designs, and a pediment.	II*
Church Stile Farmhouse; 53.96457°N 2.44382°W		Mid 18th century	A pebbledashed house with a slate roof, in two storeys with an attic, and four bays. The doorway and windows have plain surrounds. The windows on the front are sashes, and the doorway has a false keystone. Elsewhere there are a mullioned window and a cross window.	II
Holmehead Bridge; 53.97318°N 2.43490°W		18th century (possible)	The bridge carries a track over the River Hodder. It is in stone, and consists of a single segmental arch, and it has solid parapets.	II
Ivy Cottage; 53.96780°N 2.44366°W		Mid 18th century	The house is in stone with a slate roof, and has two storeys and three bays. The windows have moulded surrounds, and some mullions have been retained. The doorway has a moulded architrave.	II
6 and 8 Chapel Street; 53.96673°N 2.44053°W		Late 18th century (probable)	A pair of limestone houses with sandstone dressings and a stone-slate roof, in two storeys. No. has one bay, and No. 8 has two. There is one horizontal sliding sash window, the other windows being mullioned. The doorways have plain surrounds.	II
8 Church Street; 53.96654°N 2.44170°W	—	Late 18th century	Originally two cottages, it is a rendered house with sandstone dressings and a slate roof, in two storeys and two bays. The windows and doorways have plain surrounds. The windows have three lights with mullions. In the centre were two doorways approached by three steps; the right doorway has been converted into a window.	II
17 Church Street; 53.96616°N 2.44190°W	—	Late 18th century	A stone house with a slate roof, in two storeys and one bay. The windows and doorway have plain surrounds, and the window in the upper floor has a mullion.	II
19 Church Street and barn 53.96612°N 2.44197°W	—	Late 18th century (probable)	The house and barn are in stone with a slate roof. The house has two storeys and two bays, and the openings have plain surrounds, the windows being mullioned. The barn to the right has a wide entrance with a segmental head, and a blocked chamfered doorway.	II
31 Church Street; 53.96488°N 2.44315°W	—	Late 18th century (probable)	The house is in stone with a slate roof, and has two storeys and two bays. There is a doorway to the left of each bay, and the windows and doorways have plain surrounds.	II
33 Church Street; 53.96478°N 2.44332°W	—	Late 18th century	A stone house with sandstone dressings and an imitation slate roof. There are two storeys and two bays, and the openings have plain surrounds. The ground floor windows have central mullions.	II
Duckmire Farmhouse and barn 53.96677°N 2.44019°W		Late 18th century	The house and barn are in sandstone with a stone-slate roof. The house has two storeys and two bays. The windows on the front are sashes, and the doorway has a plain surround. To the left is a barn that has a wide entrance with chamfered jambs and voussoirs, a doorway, and a pitching hole. The building also contains two re-set doorways with four-centred arches and a mullioned window.	II
Field Head Farmhouse; 53.96574°N 2.42019°W	—	Late 18th century	A stone house with a stone-slate roof, in two storeys and three bays. The windows and doorway have plain surrounds, and the windows are mullioned.	II
Lower Edge Farmhouse; 53.96924°N 2.40435°W	—	Late 18th century	A stone house with a stone-slate roof, in two storeys and two bays. The windows and doorway have plain surrounds, and there is an open stone porch. The windows have three lights and are mullioned.	II
New Bridge; 53.96626°N 2.43678°W		Late 18th century	The bridge carries the B6478 road over the River Hodder. It is in sandstone, and consists of two segmental arches with triangular cutwaters. The bridge has a solid parapet with weathered coping.	II
Youth Hostel; 53.96675°N 2.44137°W		Late 18th century (probable)	Originally a house, later used for other purposes, it is rendered with sandstone dressings and a slate roof. There are two storeys and four bays, and the windows are sashes. The doorway has a chamfered surround and a hood of two slates. On the left gable end is a flight of external stone steps, and a mounting block.	II
Bell Sykes Farmhouse; 53.97022°N 2.42844°W	—	Late 18th century	A sandstone house with a slate roof, in two storeys and two bays. The windows and doorway have plain surrounds; the windows on the front have three lights and mullions, the central light being sashed. Also on the front is a plaque inscribed with initials and the date. At the rear is a window with two transoms.	II
Sundial; 53.96385°N 2.44382°W		1796	The sundial is in the churchyard of St Andrew's Church. It is in sandstone, and has a base of four circular steps, a round, tapering fluted column, and a moulded cap. On the cap are an inscribed brass plate and a gnomon.	II
4 Chapel Street; 53.96676°N 2.44066°W	—	c 1800	The house is in limestone and sandstone with sandstone dressings and a slate roof. It has two storeys and one bay. The windows and door have plain surrounds, and the windows are sashes.	II
16 Church Street; 53.96635°N 2.44194°W	—	c 1800	A sandstone house with a slate roof, in two storeys and one bay. The windows have three lights with mullions, and the doorway has a plain surround.	II
Bridge End; 53.97767°N 2.45411°W	—	c 1800	A limestone house with sandstone dressings and a slate roof, in two storeys and two bays. The windows have three lights, they are mullioned, and the central lights are sashed. The doorway has a porch with a flat roof.	II
Old Bridge; 53.96762°N 2.44036°W		c 1800	The bridge carries a road, The Skaithe, over Croasdale Beck. It is in limestone with sandstone dressings, and consists of two segmental arches, the one to the north being the narrower. The bridge has a triangular cutwater on the west, and a solid parapet with coping and a string course.	II
18 and 20 Church Street; 53.96632°N 2.44201°W	—	1810	A pair of sandstone houses with a slate roof, in two storeys with an attic. Each house has one bay. The windows are sashes with plain surrounds. In the left gable end is an attic window with a semicircular head and a keystone.	II
20, 22 and 24 Chapel Street; 53.96658°N 2.44013°W	—	1811	A row of three sandstone houses with a slate roof, in three storeys. The windows and doorways have plain surrounds, and most of the windows are sashes. No. 22 has a wide entrance with a segmental head, above which is an plaque inscribed with initials and the date.	II
Highcross; 53.96649°N 2.44174°W	—	1815	The house is at No. 10 Church Street, and is rendered with a slate roof. There are two storeys and one bay. The windows and doorway have plain surrounds, the window in the upper floor being a sash window.	II
Guidepost; 53.97277°N 2.46444°W	—	1816	The guidepost is in sandstone, and has a rectangular section with a flat top. Its faces are inscribed "To Hornby"; "To Slaidburn"; the other face being illegible. On the back is the date.	II
10 Chapel Street; 53.96670°N 2.44044°W		Early 19th century	A sandstone house with a slate roof in two storeys and two bays. The windows and door have plain surrounds, and most of the windows are sashes.	II
12 Chapel Street; 53.96666°N 2.44035°W	—	Early 19th century	A sandstone house with a slate roof in two storeys and two bays. The windows and door have plain surrounds, and most of the windows are sashes.	II
14 Chapel Street; 53.96665°N 2.44031°W	—	Early 19th century	The house is in sandstone with a roof partly of slate and partly of stone-slate. It has two storeys and one bay, and the windows and doorway have plain surrounds. Most of the windows have three lights and mullions, and there is one small one-light window.	II
16 and 18 Chapel Street; 53.96664°N 2.44027°W	—	Early 19th century	A pair of sandstone houses with a stone-slate roof. They have two storeys and each house has one bay. The doorways are paired in the centre, they have plain surrounds, and are approached by three stone steps. The windows are sashes and also have plain surrounds.	II
4 Church Street; 53.96663°N 2.44171°W	—	Early 19th century (probable)	Originally two cottages, the house is in limestone with a slate roof. There are two storeys and two bays. The windows and doorways have plain surrounds.	II
12 Church Street; 53.96645°N 2.44177°W	—	Early 19th century (probable)	Originally a smithy, later used as a store, it is in limestone with a stone-slate roof, and has two storeys. In the ground floor is a wide entrance with a segmental arch, and to the right is a window and a shuttered opening. The upper floor contains two fixed windows with plain surrounds.	II
3 Town End; 53.96678°N 2.44183°W	—	Early 19th century (probable)	A limestone house with a slate roof, in two storeys and two bays. The openings have plain surrounds. The windows are sashes, and to the right of the doorway is a shuttered opening.	II
5, 7 and 9 Town End; 53.96681°N 2.44196°W		Early 19th century (probable)	A row of three houses, mainly in limestone in the lower storey and sandstone above, and with two storeys, attics and cellars. Nos. 5 and 9 have one bay, and No. 7 has two. The doorways, windows and cellar openings have plain surrounds. Steps lead up to the doorways, and those of Nos. 7 and 9 are paired. In the right gable wall is an attic window.	II
13 and 15 Church Street; 53.96626°N 2.44178°W	—	Early to mid 19th century	A pair of sandstone houses with a slate roof in two storeys. No. 13 has two bays, and No. 15 has one. The windows are sashes with a central mullion, and the doorways have plain surrounds.	II
3 Church Street; 53.96664°N 2.44143°W		c. 1840	The building is in sandstone with quoins and a slate roof. There are two storeys and three bays. The ground floor windows have mullions and transoms, and above the central doorway is a small window with a segmental head. The doorway has a chamfered surround and a triangular head. At the rear is a projecting wing, a re-set 17th-century lintel, and an external flight of steps. (Note: Street View in April 2009 shows that the building is no longer the town's Post Office, this function having been taken over by the shop at LEN 1362255.)	II
2 Church Street and shop 53.96673°N 2.44159°W		1843	The house and shop are in stone with sandstone dressings and a slate roof, and are in two storeys. Most of the windows are mullioned or mullioned and transomed. The shop projects slight forward and is gabled. The doorway has a chamfered surround and a Tudor arched head, and in the gable is an inscribed stone shield. The doorway of the house has a chamfered surround and a triangular head, and the window above it has a segmental head. The right return has one bay, and a gable with a finial.	II
1 Town End; 53.96678°N 2.44171°W	—	1843	A stone house with sandstone dressings and a slate roof, in two storeys and three bays. The central bay projects forward and is gabled with a finial. The central doorway and the windows have chamfered surrounds, and the windows have mullions and transoms. The window in the upper floor of the central bay has a segmental head, and above it is a carved coat of arms. The doorway has a triangular head and a hood mould.	II
Railings, gatepiers and gates, Rock House; 53.96763°N 2.44334°W		Mid 19th century (probable)	The pairs of gate and end piers are in sandstone. They have a square section and shaped tops. The gate and railings are in cast iron, and have urn finials.	II
War memorial 53.96691°N 2.44071°W		After 1918	The war memorial consists of an octagonal sandstone pillar with a moulded base and cap on an octagonal platform. Standing on the top is the bronze statue of a soldier holding a rifle. On the memorial are plaques with the names of those lost from the villages of Slaidburn, Dunsop and Newton.	II

== Notes and references ==
=== Sources ===
- Historic England, "Cross base at Cross Gates, Slaidburn (1163860)", National Heritage List for England
- Historic England, "Cross base adjoining southeast side of New Bridge, Slaidburn (1362279)", National Heritage List for England
- Historic England, "Church of St. Andrew, Slaidburn (1163738)", National Heritage List for England
- Historic England, "Cross shaft, 2 metres north of tower, Church of St. Andrew, Slaidburn (1362259)", National Heritage List for England
- Historic England, "The Hark to Bounty, Slaidburn (1362260)", National Heritage List for England
- Historic England, "Former stable adjoining to the north-east of No. 27 Church Street, Slaidburn (1362258)", National Heritage List for England
- Historic England, "Knott Gate, Slaidburn (1072229)", National Heritage List for England
- Historic England, "Ellerbeck Hall, Slaidburn (1318036)", National Heritage List for England
- Historic England, "Rock House and barn adjoining to west, Slaidburn (1163802)", National Heritage List for England
- Historic England, "Brennand's Endowed School, Slaidburn (1072224)", National Heritage List for England
- Historic England, "Merrybent Hill, Slaidburn (1362261)", National Heritage List for England
- Historic England, "Townhead, Slaidburn (1072190)", National Heritage List for England
- Historic England, "Church Stile Farmhouse, Slaidburn (1072221)", National Heritage List for England
- Historic England, "Holmehead Bridge, Slaidburn (1163890)", National Heritage List for England
- Historic England, "Ivy Cottage, Slaidburn (1163819)", National Heritage List for England
- Historic England, "Nos. 6 and 8 Chapel Street, Slaidburn (1362292)", National Heritage List for England
- Historic England, "No. 8 Church Street, Slaidburn (1072219)", National Heritage List for England
- Historic England, "No. 17 Church Street, Slaidburn (1072222)", National Heritage List for England
- Historic England, "No. 19 Church Street and barn adjoining to south, Slaidburn (1318130)", National Heritage List for England
- Historic England, "No. 31 Church Street, Slaidburn (1072223)", National Heritage List for England
- Historic England, "No. 33 Church Street, Slaidburn (1318096)", National Heritage List for England
- Historic England, "Duckmire Farmhouse and barn adjoining to west, Slaidburn (1362291)", National Heritage List for England
- Historic England, "Field Head Farmhouse, Slaidburn (1072232)", National Heritage List for England
- Historic England, "Lower Edge Farmhouse, Slaidburn (1072225)", National Heritage List for England
- Historic England, "New Bridge, Slaidburn (1072233)", National Heritage List for England
- Historic England, "Youth Hostel, Slaidburn (1163670)", National Heritage List for England
- Historic England, "Bell Sykes Farmhouse, Slaidburn (1163879)", National Heritage List for England
- Historic England, "Sundial, 40 metres south of tower, St. Andrew's Churchyard, Slaidburn (1318112)", National Heritage List for England
- Historic England, "No. 4 Chapel Street, Slaidburn (1072215)", National Heritage List for England
- Historic England, "No. 16 Church Street, Slaidburn (1362256)", National Heritage List for England
- Historic England, "Bridge End, Slaidburn (1072231)", National Heritage List for England
- Historic England, "Old Bridge, Slaidburn (1163902)", National Heritage List for England
- Historic England, "Nos. 18 and 20 Church Street, Slaidburn (1163662)", National Heritage List for England
- Historic England, "Nos. 20, 22 and 24 Chapel Street, Slaidburn (1163626)", National Heritage List for England
- Historic England, "Highcross, Slaidburn (1318137)", National Heritage List for England
- Historic England, "Guidepost, 50 metres northwest of Harrisons, Slaidburn (1072230)", National Heritage List for England
- Historic England, "No. 10 Chapel Street, Slaidburn (1072216)", National Heritage List for England
- Historic England, "No. 12 Chapel Street, Slaidburn (1072217)", National Heritage List for England
- Historic England, "No. 14 Chapel Street, Slaidburn (1362293)", National Heritage List for England
- Historic England, "Nos. 16 and 18 Chapel Street, Slaidburn (1072218)", National Heritage List for England
- Historic England, "No. 4 Church Street, Slaidburn (1163633)", National Heritage List for England
- Historic England, "No. 12 Church Street, Slaidburn (1072220)", National Heritage List for England
- Historic England, "No. 3 Town End, Slaidburn (1318067)", National Heritage List for England
- Historic England, "Nos. 5, 7 and 9 Town End, Slaidburn (1072228)", National Heritage List for England
- Historic England, "No. 13 and 15 Church Street, Slaidburn (1163698)", National Heritage List for England
- Historic England, "No. 3 Church Street, Slaidburn (1362257)", National Heritage List for England
- Historic England, "Nos. 2 Church Street and shop (Central Stores) adjoining to north, Slaidburn (1362255)", National Heritage List for England
- Historic England, "No. 1 Town End, Slaidburn (1072227)", National Heritage List for England
- Historic England, "Railings, gatepiers and gates south of Rock House, Slaidburn (1072226)", National Heritage List for England
- Historic England, "War Memorial, Slaidburn (1072214)", National Heritage List for England
- Historic England, Listed Buildings
