= St Andrew's Church, Slaidburn =

Coordinates: 53.9642°N 2.4434°W

St Andrew's Church
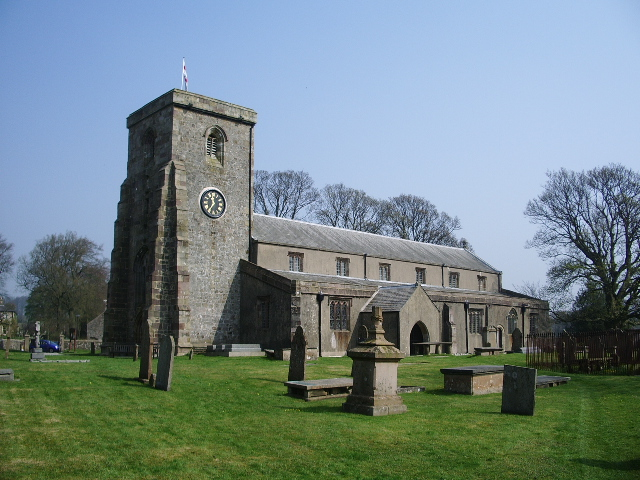
- Viewed from the southwest

- Location in Ribble Valley Borough Location in the Forest of Bowland
- OS grid reference: SD 710 521
- Location: Church Street, Slaidburn, Lancashire
- Country: England
- Denomination: Anglican
- Churchmanship: Central
- Website: St Andrew, Slaidburn

History
- Status: Parish church
- Dedication: Saint Andrew

Architecture
- Functional status: Active
- Heritage designation: Grade I
- Designated: 16 November 1954
- Architectural type: Church
- Style: Gothic

Specifications
- Materials: Sandstone, stone slate roofs

Administration
- Province: York
- Diocese: Blackburn
- Archdeaconry: Blackburn
- Deanery: Whalley
- Parish: Slaidburn

Clergy
- Rector: Jonathan Oldfield

St Andrew's Church is in Church Street, Slaidburn, Lancashire, England. It is an active Anglican parish church in the Deanary of Whalley, the Archdeaconry of Blackburn, and the Diocese of Blackburn. Its benefice is united with that of St George, Dunsop Bridge, St Michael's Church Whitewell and St Bartholomew's Church, Tosside. The church is recorded in the National Heritage List for England as a designated Grade I listed building. It is notable for its "quantity of good early woodwork".

== History ==
St Andrew's dates from the 15th century, with alterations made in the 17th century. The east wall was rebuilt in 1866.

== Architecture ==
The church is constructed in sandstone, with stone slate roofs. Its plan consists of a nave and chancel under a continuous roof with a clerestory, north and south aisles, a south porch, and a west tower. The tower is in five stages. It has a west doorway, above which is a three-light window. Over this are two niches, one above the other, with a single-light window between. The bell openings have two lights, and the parapet is plain. In the south wall of the church is a blocked priest's door. The east window has five lights.

Inside the church is a five-bay south arcade and a six-bay north arcade, both carried on octagonal piers. In the south aisle is a piscina. The pews date from the 17th and 18th centuries, some of them being box pews. The three-decker pulpit, with its sounding board, is from the 18th century. There is also a rood screen, dating from the 1630s, or later, and another screen in the south aisle. The two-manual pipe organ was built in about 1870 by Bevington and Sons. There is a ring of six bells, all of which were cast at the Whitechapel Bell Foundry, five of them in 1843 by Thomas Mears II, and the sixth in 1927 by Mears and Stainbank.

== External features ==
In the churchyard is a sandstone cross shaft dating probably from the 16th century. the upper part of which is carved. It is listed at Grade II. The churchyard also contains the war grave of a Duke of Wellington's Regiment soldier of World War I.

== See also ==
- Grade I listed churches in Lancashire
- Listed buildings in Slaidburn
