= Alveston, Warwickshire =

Village in Warwickshire, England

Coordinates: 52.20°N 01.66°W

Alveston
- Village Green, Alveston

- Location within Warwickshire
- OS grid reference: SP2356
- Civil parish: Stratford-upon-Avon
- District: Stratford-on-Avon
- Shire county: Warwickshire
- Region: West Midlands
- Country: England
- Sovereign state: United Kingdom
- Post town: Stratford-upon-Avon
- Postcode district: CV37
- Police: Warwickshire
- Fire: Warwickshire
- Ambulance: West Midlands

Alveston is a village and former civil parish, now in the parish of Stratford-upon-Avon, and around 3 miles (4.8 km) north-east of Stratford town centre, in the Stratford-on-Avon district, in the county of Warwickshire, England. It is located to the south of, and within a bend of the River Avon. In 1951 the parish had a population of 2,659.

There is the youth hostel for Stratford-upon-Avon in Hemingford House. The village was represented by Alveston F.C. between 1924 and 2017, when they folded. For most of its history, the club played in the Stratford & District League and the Midland Football Combination.

The village's Church of St James is a Grade II listed building on Church Lane. The church has 6 change ringing bells in the key of A. The village also contains a one-room Old Church and its accompanying timber-framed Old Rectory.

Alveston was the home of the playwright J B Priestley and his wife Jacquetta Hawkes, who lived at Kissing Tree House in the village, in his later years, until his death in 1984. The house was called Avonmore in the 1901 census and his secretary lived in Avonmore Cottage which is still there in Kissing Tree Lane.

On 1 April 1974 the parish was abolished and merged with Stratford upon Avon.
