= Hemingford House =

- Location within Warwickshire
- 52°12′13″N 1°39′48″W
- Location: Alveston
- OS grid reference: SP230562

History
- Built: early to mid 19th century

Site notes
- Area: Warwickshire, England

Listed Building – Grade II
- Designated: 9 February 1972
- Reference no.: 1187776

Hemingford House is a 19th-century house in Alveston near Stratford on Avon in Warwickshire, England. It is a Grade II listed building.

== History ==
The present building dates from the early to mid 19th century. The first recorded owner was Henry Wells Allfrey (1817–1887) who purchased the house in 1840 and on his death it passed onto his son, Henry Allfrey (1850–1938). On the death of Henry the property was sold and during the Second World War was used by the Iron and Steel Control organisation (part of the Ministry of Supply). In 1947 the building was sold to the Youth Hostels Association and has remained in use as a youth hostel since then.

== Construction ==
The style is Georgian with Doric columns. The house is a three storeyed building of stone finished with a stucco render and with ashlar finishing around the doors and windows. The roof is of slate and hipped with parapets. The main building has a wing on each side of two storeys and a third wing on the back of the building. The overall view from the front of the original building is therefore of a symmetrical design although an additional range was added on one side by YHA.
