= King's House, Slaidburn =

King's House
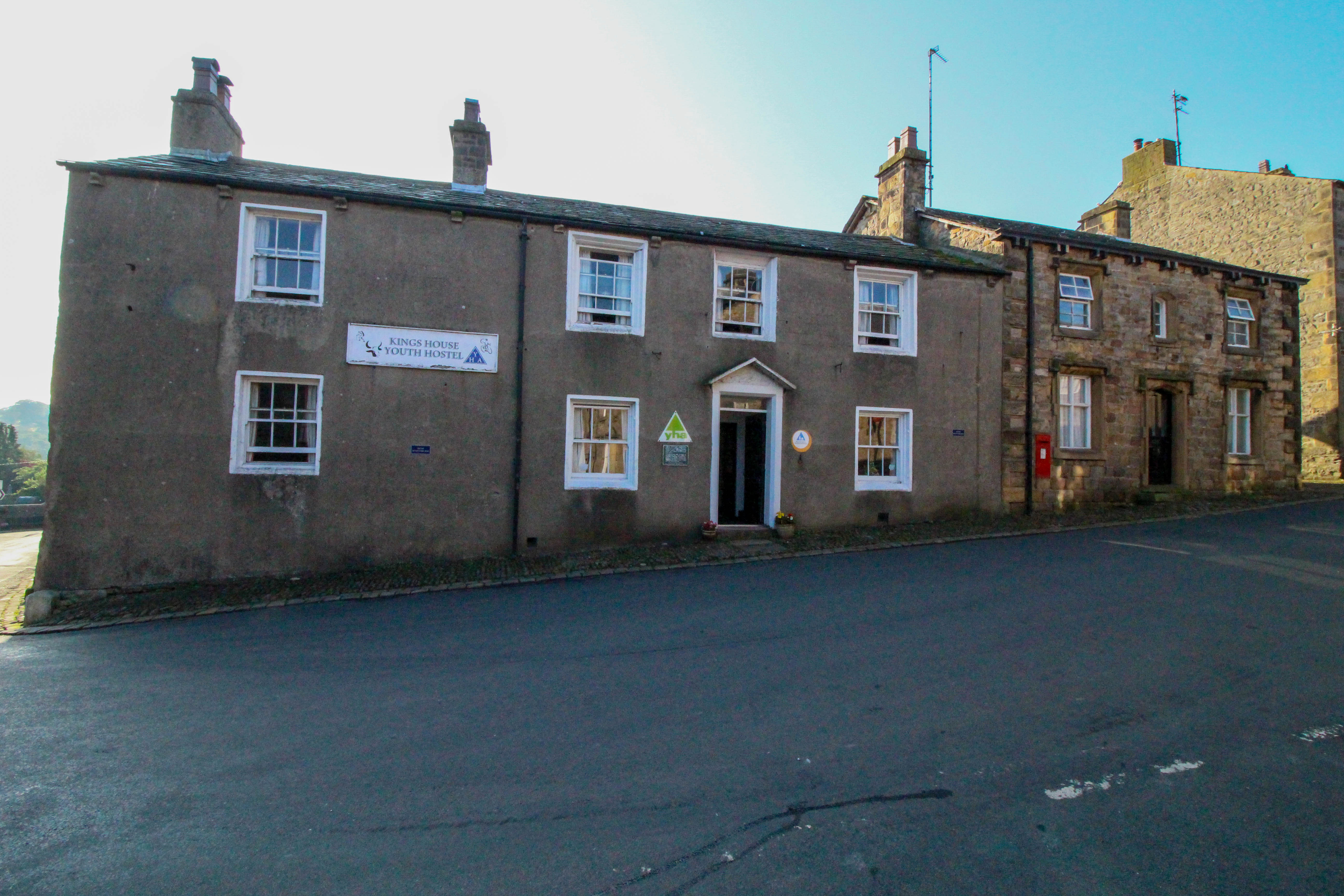
- King's House

- Location within the Borough of Ribble Valley
- 53°57′59″N 2°26′29″W
- Location: Slaidburn
- OS grid reference: SD 711 523

Site notes
- Area: Lancashire

Listed Building – Grade II
- Designated: 16 November 1983
- Reference no.: 1163670

King's House is a Grade II listed building in Slaidburn, Lancashire, England, now used as a youth hostel. It was originally built in the 18th century, although parts of the building date back to the 17th century, as the Black Bull public house. The building remained an inn until 1932 when it was rented to YHA and has remained in use as a youth hostel since then. The official opening took place on 28 August 1932. The name King's House is derived from the King family who owned the village the 17th century and whose descendants, the King-Wilkinson family, still own most of the properties in the village.

== Construction ==
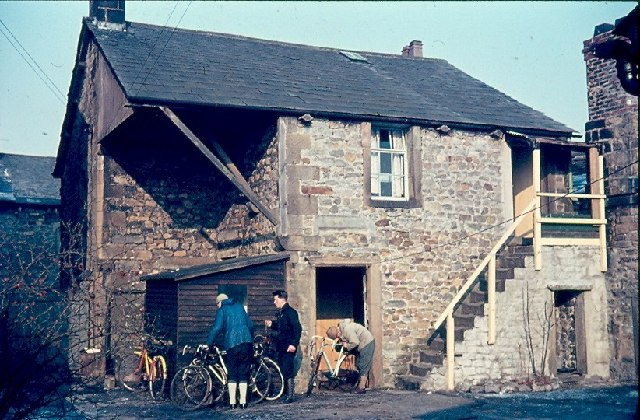
The rear elevation of the south range pictured in 1963

The building is of stone construction with a render over the stone. The roof and dressings are of sandstone. The frontage buildings have two storeys, the rear extension being a single storey. The south range being slightly higher than the north range. A number of outbuildings form the rear border to the yard, which is paved with setts and contains a block used for re-tyring of wheels.

== See also ==
- Listed buildings in Slaidburn
