= Listed buildings in Hellifield =

Hellifield is a civil parish in the county of North Yorkshire, England. It contains 25 listed buildings that are recorded in the National Heritage List for England. Of these, two are listed at Grade II*, the middle of the three grades, and the others are at Grade II, the lowest grade. The parish contains the villages of Hellifield, Nappa and Swinden, and the surrounding countryside. The listed buildings include houses and associated structures, cottages, farmhouses, farm buildings, milestones, a bridge, a railway station and a church.

== Key ==
Grade	Criteria
II*	Particularly important buildings of more than special interest
II	Buildings of national importance and special interest

== Buildings ==
Name and location	Photograph	Date	Notes	Grade
Hellifield Peel; 53.99603°N 2.21583°W		14th century	The building originated as a solar tower, and, probably in the 15th century, it was converted into a tower house. It is in stone with a later embattled parapet, and has three storeys and three bays. The house contains windows with moulded surrounds, and in the left return are two staircase windows with chamfered surrounds, one with an ogee head. At the rear are two garderobe chutes.	II
Swinden Hall; 53.98564°N 2.21334°W		1657	The house is in stone with quoins and a stone slate roof. There are three storeys and three bays, the middle bay projecting as a full-height gabled porch. The doorway has a Tudor arch and a hood mould, its lintel scratched with initials and the date. The windows have double-chamfered mullions, cast iron lozenge glazing and hood moulds, those in the top floor stepped with three lights. To the right is a previous farmhouse with two storeys and three bays.	II*
Goosmere Height Farmhouse; 53.99398°N 2.22332°W	—	Late 17th century (probable)	The house is in stone, and has a stone slate roof with coped gables and kneelers. There are two storeys and three bays. The doorway has a segmental head and a chamfered surround, and the windows, which have been altered, are mullioned.	II
Stansfield Farmhouse; 53.97706°N 2.22000°W	—	1678 (possible)	The farmhouse is in stone with a stone slate roof, two storeys and three bays. The doorway has a chamfered surround and a Tudor arch head, and above it is an inscription and a date. The windows have double-chamfered mullions.	II
Arnford Farmhouse; 54.00232°N 2.25107°W	—	c. 1700	A pair of semi-detached mirror-image houses, later converted into one farmhouse, in stone with millstone grit dressings, and a stone slate roof with kneelers. There are two storeys and eight bays. Each house has a plinth, and contains a central doorway with a moulded surround, a pulvinated frieze and a moulded hood. It contains cross windows with hood moulds, and a gabled dormer with a chamfered mullioned window, a kneeler and a spike finial. Inside, there is an inglenook fireplace.	II*
Milestone at SD8590956557; 54.00488°N 2.21641°W		1733	The milestone at the junction of the A65 road and Malham Road is in gritstone, it is about 65 centimetres (26 in) high and has a triangular plan. There are inscriptions on two faces indicating the distances to Grassington and to Settle.	II
Swinden Manor House; 53.98469°N 2.21317°W	—	Early to mid 18th century (probable)	The house is in stone with a stone slate roof, two storeys and two bays. The windows are mullioned, in the ground floor with square recessed mullions, and in the upper floor with double-chamfered mullions.	II
Halton Bridge; 53.99249°N 2.22757°W		Mid 18th century	The bridge carries Hellifield Road over the River Ribble. It is in stone, and has three main arches, and two small arches to the north, all of which are segmental. There are three cutwaters with triangular caps, ten pilasters, a string course, coped parapet, and ten bollards on each side of the road corresponding to the pilasters.	II
Switchers Farmhouse; 53.99941°N 2.19191°W		Mid to late 18th century	The farmhouse is in stone with millstone grit dressings, chamfered quoins, and a stone slate roof with gable copings and shaped kneelers. There are two storeys and three bays. The windows, formerly mullioned, contain casements.	II
Manor House Farmhouse; 53.97624°N 2.22109°W	—	Late 18th century (probable)	The farmhouse is in stone, with a stone slate roof, two storeys and three bays. The doorway and windows have plain surrounds. In the middle bay are three-light mullioned windows, and the other windows are sashes.	II
Barn at Stansfield Farmhouse; 53.97698°N 2.21951°W	—	1789	The barn is in stone with a stone slate roof. In the gable end is a pitching door over a tall opening with an inscribed and dated lintel.	II
Stable at Stansfield Farmhouse; 53.97709°N 2.22021°W	—	1798	The stable is in stone with a stone slate roof, two storeys and two bays. One doorway has an inscribed and dated lintel, and another doorway, facing the farmhouse, has a chamfered surround, a basket-arched head, and an initialled and dated lintel, probably re-set.	II
Hellifield House; 54.00399°N 2.22144°W		Late 18th to early 19th century	The house, later used for other purposes, is rendered, with painted stone dressings, shaped eaves modillions, and a stone slate roof with gable coping. There are two storeys and four bays. The doorway has a moulded surround, a pulvinated frieze, and a decorated lintel, and to the left is a former doorway converted into a window. The windows are casements with plain surrounds.	II
High Ground Farmhouse; 53.99433°N 2.19753°W	—	Late 18th to early 19th century	The farmhouse is pebbledashed, with painted stone dressings and a slate roof. There are two storeys and three bays. The doorway to the left has a chamfered surround, and to the right is a slate porch with moulded sides and a gabled hood. Most of the windows have flat-faced mullions, and contain casements.	II
Rook Cottage; 54.00379°N 2.22179°W	—	Early 19th century	The cottage is in limewashed stone, with painted stone dressings, and a slate roof hipped on the left. There is a single storey, three bays, and a single-bay rear wing. The doorway has a plain surround, the middle window has two lights and flat-faced mullions, and the others have fixed lights.	II
Fisherman's Cottage; 53.97603°N 2.22165°W	—	Early to mid 19th century	The house is in stone with a hipped slate roof. There are two storeys and three bays. The middle bay projects and contains a doorway with a fanlight. Above it is a small circular recess with four keystones, and the windows are sashes.	II
1–4 Hellifield Green and gate piers 54.00068°N 2.22020°W		c. 1845	A large house divided into four, in stone with sill band, a moulded cornice, and a hipped slate roof. There are two storeys and three bays, the middle bay projecting slightly, and a recessed service wing to the left with two storeys and two bays. On the front is a porch with four Ionic columns and an entablature, and a doorway with a rectangular fanlight. The windows are sashes, those in the ground floor with wedge lintels and imitation voussoirs. The front wall contains gate piers, those to No. 4 with scrolled consoles.	II
Milestone at SD8512852561; 53.96907°N 2.22803°W		Mid 19th century (probable)	The milestone on the southeast side of the A682 road, consists of a stone with a wedge plan, a rounded top, and slightly canted faces. The faces are inscribed with the distances to Gisburn and Settle.	II
Milestone at SD8579253942; 53.98127°N 2.21808°W		Mid 19th century (probable)	The milestone on the east side of the A682 road, consists of a stone with a wedge plan, a rounded top, and slightly canted faces. The faces are inscribed with the distances to Gisburn and Settle.	II
Milestone at SD8536355404; 53.99449°N 2.22468°W		Mid 19th century (probable)	The milestone on the east side of the A682 road near Goosemere Height, consists of a stone with a wedge plan, a rounded top, and slightly canted faces. The faces are inscribed with the distances to Gisburn and Settle.	II
Main passenger building, Hellifield railway station 54.01091°N 2.22774°W		1880	The station was built for the Midland Railway, and has an island platform approached by an underground passage. The building is in stone with a slate roof, and has two storeys and 18 bays. On the platforms are extensive canopies in cast iron and glass. These have elaborate columns with brackets, and spandrels incorporating the railway's symbol and foliage. To the south is a cast iron weighbridge.	II
Milestone at SD8678656229; 54.00191°N 2.20305°W	—	c. 1895	The milestone on the south side of the A65 road is in millstone grit, and has a cast iron front plate, a triangular plan and a round top. On the top is inscribed "KEIGHLEY & KENDAL ROAD" and "HELLIFIELD", on one side are the distances to Settle and Skipton, and on the other to Kendal and Keighley.	II
Milestone at SD8536356742; 54.00655°N 2.22488°W		c. 1895	The milestone on the south side of Kendal Road (A65 road) is in millstone grit, and has a cast iron front plate, a triangular plan and a round top. On the top is inscribed "KEIGHLEY & KENDAL ROAD" and "HELLIFIELD", on the left side are the distances to Settle and Skipton, and on the right side the distances to Kendal and Keighley.	II
Milestone at SD8413457491; 54.01322°N 2.24364°W		c. 1895	The milestone on the southwest side of the (A65 road) is in millstone grit, and has a cast iron front plate, a triangular plan and a round top. On the top is inscribed "KEIGHLEY & KENDAL ROAD" and "LONG PRESTON", on the left side are the distances to Settle and Skipton, and on the right side the distances to Kendal and Keighley.	II
St Aidan's Church; 54.00421°N 2.22017°W		1905–06	The church is in sandstone with a Westmorland slate roof, and consists of a nave, a north porch, a chancel with a north vestry, and a north tower. The tower has three stages, in the bottom stage is a three-light window with a pointed head, the second stage is recessed behind a splayed water table, and contains a lancet window, a clock face, and large bell openings with pointed head, and at the top is embattled machicolation.	II
