= Paythorne =

Village and civil parish in Lancashire, England

Coordinates: 53.963°N 2.261°W

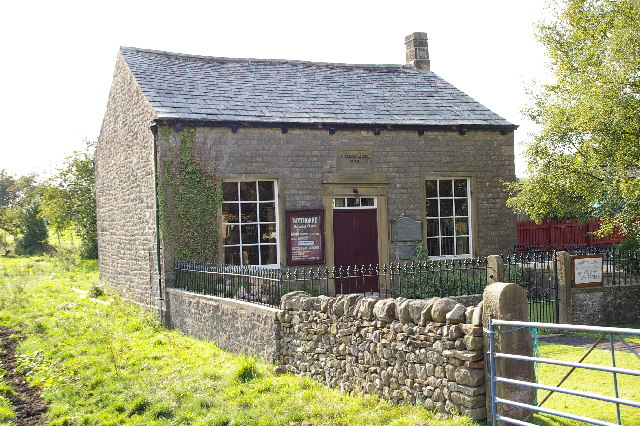
- Paythorne Methodist Chapel

- Shown within Ribble Valley Location within Lancashire
- Population: 95 (2001 census)
- OS grid reference: SD829519
- Civil parish: Paythorne
- District: Ribble Valley
- Shire county: Lancashire
- Region: North West
- Country: England
- Sovereign state: United Kingdom
- Post town: CLITHEROE
- Postcode district: BB7
- Dialling code: 01200
- Police: Lancashire
- Fire: Lancashire
- Ambulance: North West
- UK Parliament: Ribble Valley

Paythorne is a small village and civil parish in Ribble Valley, Lancashire, England. It is situated alongside the River Ribble, north-east of Clitheroe, and on the boundary with North Yorkshire. Other parishes adjacent to Paythorne are Halton West, Nappa (both in North Yorkshire), Newsholme, Horton, Gisburn, Sawley, Bolton-by-Bowland and Gisburn Forest (all in Lancashire). The nearest town is Barnoldswick, situated 7 kilometres (4.3 mi) south-east of the village. Paythorne is on the edge of the Forest of Bowland Area of Outstanding Natural Beauty, although only a small area in the west of the parish is within the area's boundary. The Ribble Way long-distance walk passes through the village.

Paythorne is a small village, with not many facilities although it has a pub (the Buck Inn) and a Methodist chapel. A mobile post office serves Gisburn; the nearest permanent Post Office is at Hellifield, 5 miles away. The area surrounding the village consists of several farms, and moorland including Paythorne Moor north of the village.

The meaning of the place name is uncertain, however suggestions have included "a thorn bush beside a pathway" and "a peacock shaped thorn bush".

The manors of Paythorne and Ellenthorpe were part of the Percy Fee which was listed under Craven in the Domesday Book. In the 1140s, William de Percy II, feudal baron of Topcliffe, granted Ellenthorpe, in the southwest of the civil parish, to the Cistercian monks who founded Sawley Abbey. The monks developed a grange here.

Historically, Paythorne was in the West Riding of Yorkshire, and before it became a parish, it was a township in the parish of Gisburn.

In the 2001 census, Paythorne had a population of 95, however in 2011 the parish was grouped with Newsholme and Horton (2001 pop. 50 and 76), giving a total of 253. From the 2011 Census population details had been included in Newsholme parish.

For local government, Paythorne is part of the ward of Gisburn, Rimington in the borough of Ribble Valley.

The Pennine Bridleway National Trail and Ribble Way pass through the parish, crossing the Ribble on the Paythorne Bridge.

== Media gallery ==
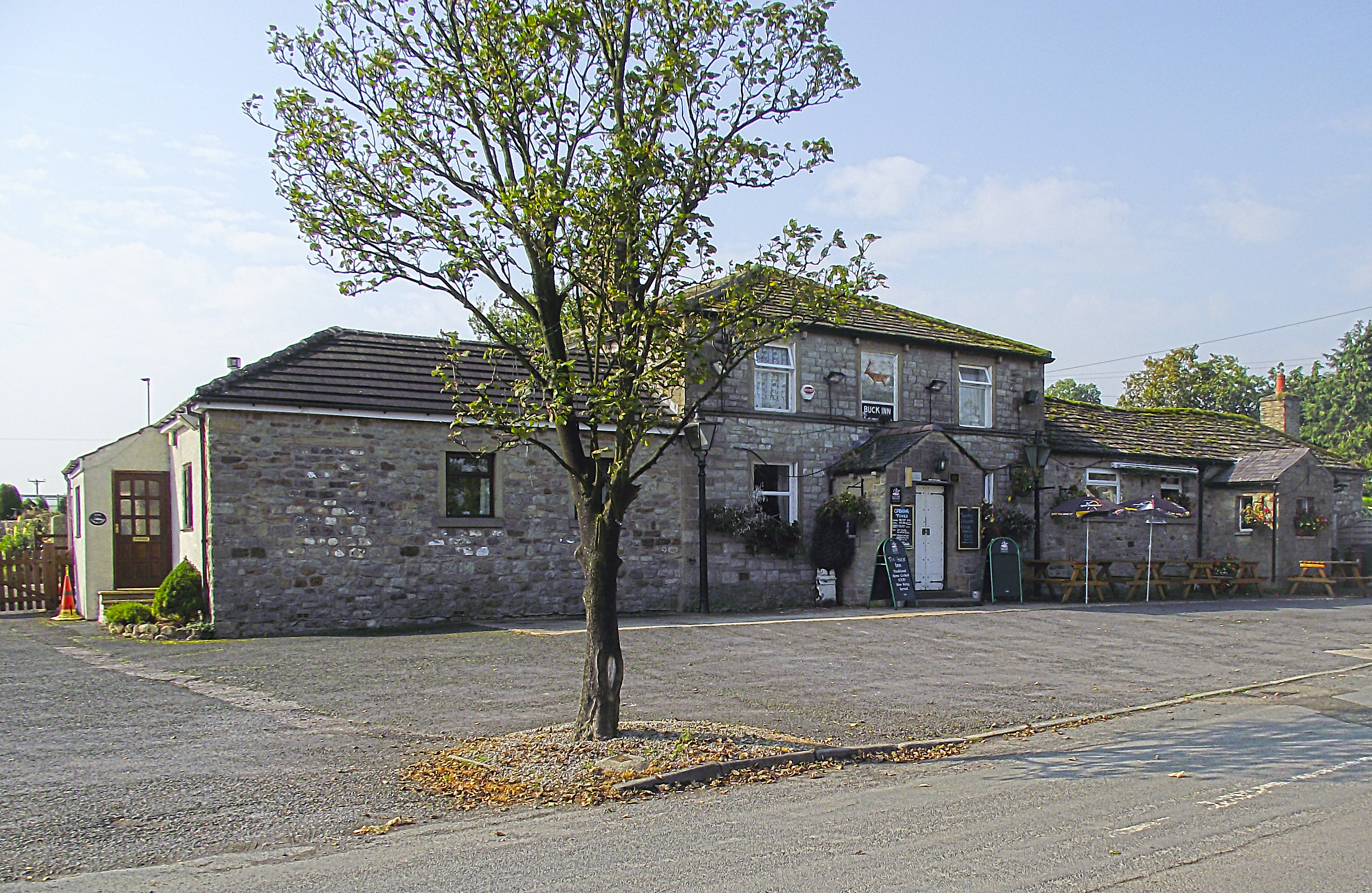
The Buck Inn

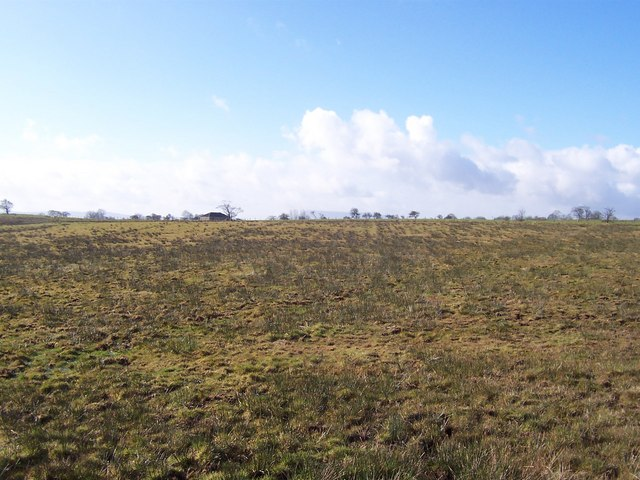
Paythorne Moor

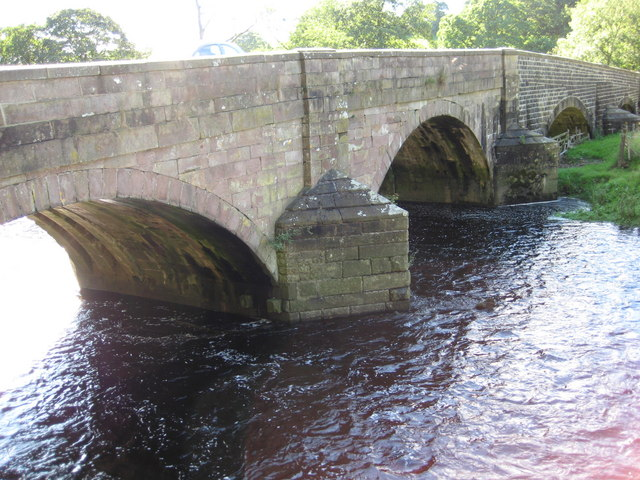
Paythorne Bridge over the River Ribble

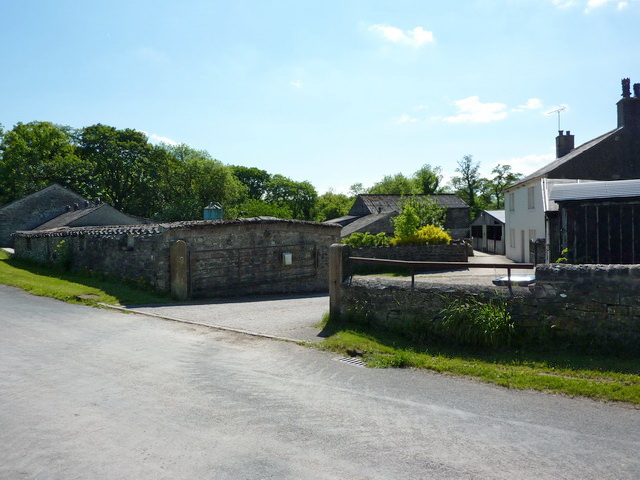
Ellenthorpe Farm in southwest of the parish (Thorp)

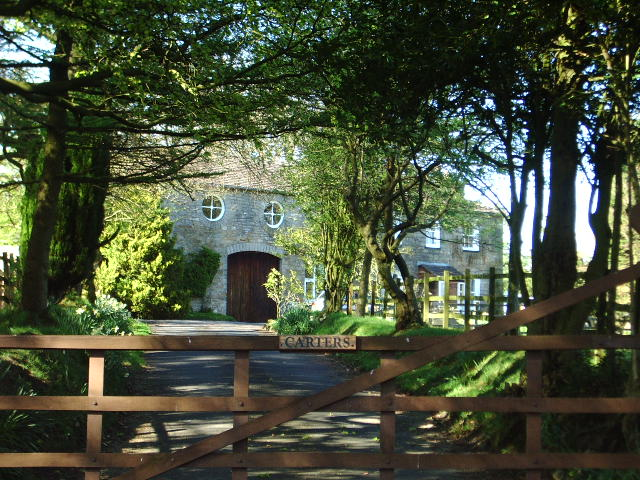
Carters Farmhouse

== See also ==
- Listed buildings in Paythorne
