= Medieval Craven =

Historic region in Yorkshire

Craven
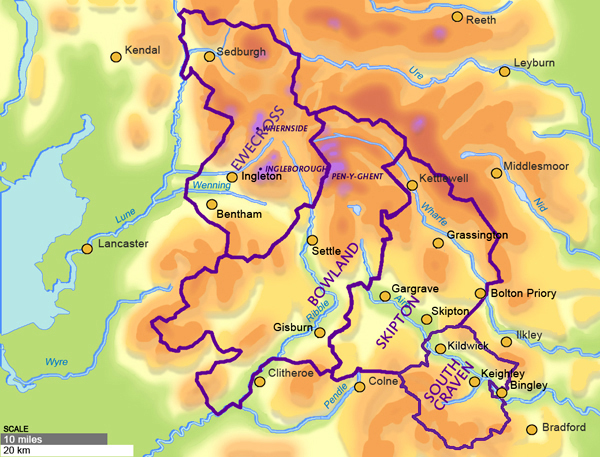

Geography
- Location: North of England; North Yorkshire, West Yorkshire, Lancashire and Cumbria

Medieval Craven refers to the polity in the north of England, which was likely founded in the Early Middle Ages, following the end of Roman rule in Britain.

While the name Craven is Brythonic in origin, its usage continued following the Anglo-Saxon settlement of Britain and the Norman conquest of England. As such, the name was used in the Domesday Book of 1086 with a number of places being described as 'in Craven' that are now found within the modern counties of North Yorkshire, West Yorkshire, Lancashire and Cumbria.

The former local government district of Craven (a much smaller area entirely within North Yorkshire) was defined in 1974 and abolished in 2023 and replaced by the unitary authority of North Yorkshire.

== Etymology ==
There are several theories regarding the origin of the name Craven. One suggestion is that it derives from the Welsh prefix craf which is used in words such as crafu 'to scratch/to scrape', crafwr 'a scratcher/a scraper' and crafanc 'a claw/talon'. This would suggest a meaning something like 'scraped land/scratched land', likely relating to the limestone features which are common to much of the area. This derivation corresponds with other known early British kingdom names.

An alternate proposal is that the name derives from the Middle Welsh crav, which commonly refers to wild garlic but may also have been used for various related plants such as other members of the onion and garlic families.

== History ==
Medieval Craven extended much further than modern Yorkshire, even today the Church of England's Deanery of South Craven, extends far beyond the borders of the historic county. Although the boundaries of Medieval Craven are the subject of much speculation, it seems that its south-eastern boundary was another British realm, the Kingdom of Elmet.

With the conquest of Scandinavian York, the area that is today's Yorkshire was divided into three Ridings (from Old Norse þriðjungr meaning "a third part"), each administered by its own thing (governing assembly). It has been suggested that the West Riding comprised the upland areas still occupied by Celtic Britons but under Viking control. This unified the Kingdom of Elmet with the areas of Craven that fell within modern Yorkshire. Although the West Riding was created during the Scandinavian period, it continued as an effective unit of administration until 1974, when it was abolished following the Local Government Act 1972.

Alternatively, it has also been suggested that numerous areas of Northern England were attached to Yorkshire as an administrative convenience by the compilers of the Domesday Book. This would suggest that the original boundaries of Viking Yorkshire were much smaller, and that Craven could have been a separate polity until the Norman Invasion of England.

== Craven in the Domesday Book ==
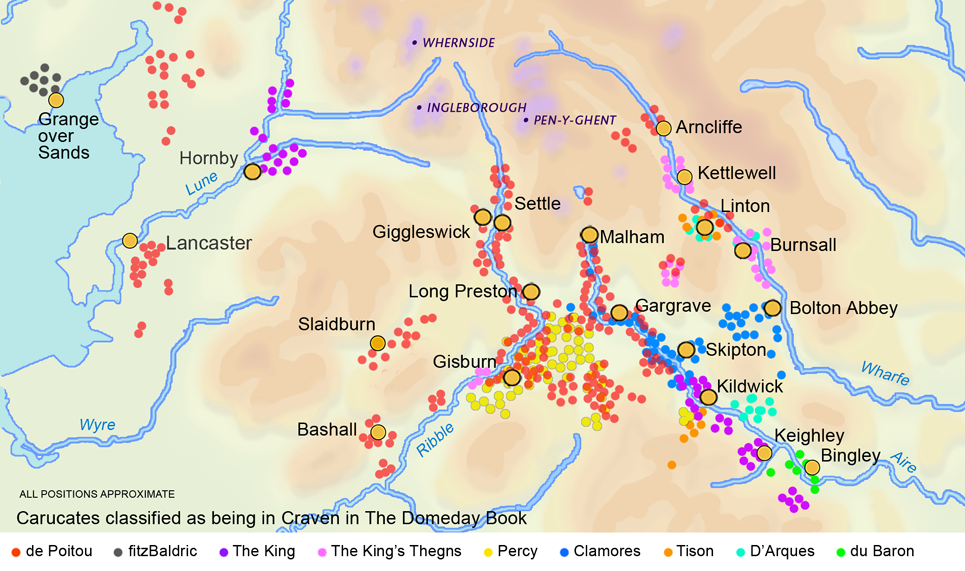
In the Domesday Book of 1086, which lists the lands ascribed to various lords, some pages have a sub-heading of In Craven, suggesting that many places in north-central England had previously belonged to an extinct geopolitical entity.

The Domesday Book (1086) was essentially an economic census of England, completed during the reign of William the Conqueror, to find out how much each landholder had in arable land and what that land was worth in terms of the taxes they used to pay under Edward the Confessor.

The areas of ploughland were counted in carucates: the land a farmer could manage throughout the year with a team of eight oxen. That area varied with the local soil but on average it was 120 acres, (50 hectares). Some carucates are designated Waste, many of these were devastated and depopulated by the Norman army during the Harrying of the North 1069–70, ca.17 years prior to this survey.

=== The Land of the King in Craven, Domesday Book folio 301v ===
Mostly in Airedale but also in Lonsdale for that was then considered part of Yorkshire.

The Land of the King in Craven
Location	Carucates	Previous	Current
Cononley	2	Thorkil	King William
Bradleys Both	7	Arnkeld, Thorkil, Gamel	King William
Farnhill	2	Gamel	King William
Kildwick	2 plus 1 church	Arnkeld	King William
Eastburn	2 1/2	Gamel Bern	King William
Utley	1	Vilts	King William
Keighley	6	Ulfkeld, Thole, Ravensvartr	King William
Wilsden	3	Gamel Bern	King William
Newsholme	1	Vilts	King William
Laycock	2	Ravensvartr	King William
Sutton-in-Craven	2	Ravenkeld	King William
Melling-with-Wrayton, Hornby-with-Farleton, Wennington	10 1/2	Ulf and Orm	King William
Thornton in Lonsdale, Burrow-with-Burrow	6	Orm	King William

=== The Land of The Clamores of Yorkshire in Craven, Domesday Book folio 380 ===
These lands centred on Bolton Abbey were soon after this date transferred to Robert de Romille. And since the Saxon manse at Bolton Abbey was beyond repair Romille built a castle elsewhere: Skipton Castle.

Location	Carucates	Previous	Soon to be
Bolton Abbey was the caput manor of a multiple estate	77, waste	Earl Edwin	Robert de Romille

=== The Land of William de Percy in Craven, Domesday Book folio 322 ===
William de Percy was the founder of the powerful English House of Percy.

The Land of William de Percy in Craven
Location	Carucates	Previous	Current
Rimington, Crooks, Little Middop, Starkeshergh	11 waste	Beornwulf	William de Percy
Bolton-by-Bowland, Raygill Moss, Holme	8 waste	Beornwulf	William de Percy
Painley, Gisburn, Paythorne, Newsholme, Ellenthorpe	12 1/2 waste	Beornwulf	William de Percy
Nappa, Horton	6 1/2 waste	Beornwulf	William de Percy
Thornton in Craven, Kelbrook	8 1/2 waste	Beornwulf	William de Percy
Swinden, Hellifield, Malham, Coniston Cold	13 1/2 waste	Beornwulf	William de Percy
Glusburn and Chelsis	3 waste	Gamal	William de Percy

=== The Land of Gilbert Tison in Craven, Domesday Book folio 327 ===
By 1118 Tison had suffered a demotion and his lands returned to the king then given to the Houses of Romille, Percy, Fitz John and d'Aubigny

The Land of Gilbert Tison in Craven
Location	Carucates	Previous	Current
Grassington, Linton, Threshfield	7	Gamal Bern	Gilbert Tison
Eastburn, Steeton	5 1/4	Gamal Bern	Gilbert Tison
Glusburn and Chelsis	3	Gamal Bern	Gilbert Tison
Oakworth	1	Gamal Bern	Gilbert Tison

=== The Land of Hugh fitzBaldric in Craven, Domesday Book folio 327v ===
An "in crave" entry in this folio is difficult to explain. It is followed by Holecher, Bretebi which Robert H Skaife identified with Holker Hall and neighbouring Birkby Hall east of Grange-over-Sands (now in Cumbria), ignoring the Craven title. William Farrer had connected them with Craven as parts of Kettlewell, although no longer traceable. All the rest of Hugh fitzBaldric's land were in East Yorkshire, and he was High Sheriff of Yorkshire 1069–1086.

Location	Carucates	Previous	Current
Holker?	8	Orm	Hugh FitzBaldric

=== The Land of Erneis du Buron in Craven, Domesday Book folio 327v ===
In 1066 a nephew of Ralph Tesson, Ernies de Buron, from Beuron near Mantes, Normandy provided William the Conqueror with money, men and the ships for the invasion of England. Ernies fought at the Battle of Hastings and is named in the Falaise Roll and in the Rolls of Battle Abbey. He settled in England 1068. The Domesday Book lists that he had seventy-two properties in Lincolnshire and Yorkshire. In 1086 he succeeded Hugh fitz Baldric as High Sheriff of Yorkshire. However between 1102 and 1118 his lands were confiscated by King Henry I and given to the House of Romille.

Location	Carucates	Previous	Current
Marley, Halton (in Bingley), Cottingley, Cullingworth, Hainworth	7 1/2	—	Erneis du Buron

=== The Land of Osbern D'Arques in Craven, Domesday Book folio 328 ===
Osbern de Arches (1059–1115) became High Sheriff of Yorkshire ca1100.

The Land of Osbern D'Arques in Craven
Location	Carucates	Previous	Current
Silsden	8	Five thegns	Osbern D'Arques
Hebden and Thorpe	4 1/4	Dreng	Osbern D'Arques
Burnsall and Drebley	2 1/4	Dreng	Osbern D'Arques
Cattal	5 waste	–	Osbern D'Arques

=== The Land of the King's Thegns in Craven, Domesday Book folio 331v ===
The term thegn means a retainer of a king or nobleman below the rank of high-reeve.

The Land of the King's Thegns in Craven
Location	Carucates	Previous	Current
Rylstone	4	Almund	Dolgfinnr
Hartlington	1	Almund	Dolgfinnr
Appletreewick	1 1/2	—	Dolgfinnr
Burnsall, Thorpe	3 1/2	Heardwulf	Heardwulf
Hartlington	3	Northmann	Northmann
Rylstone	1 1/2	Ramkel	Ramkel
Appletreewick	2	Ketil	Orm
Holdene	2	Ketil	Orm
Holdene	4	Gospatric and Ulfkil	Gospatrick and Ulfkil
Kilnsey	6	Hamal	Ulf
Heuurde	1	Gospatric	Gospatric
Conistone	3	Arnketil	Ketil

=== The Land of Roger de Poitou in Yorkshire, Domesday Book folio 332 ===
In looking for a definition of Craven, Roger de Poitou's entries on folio 332 are ambiguous for that page lacks the heading "In Craven". However some manors listed here as his are described elsewhere in the book as being in Craven. Thornton-in-Craven is quite outspoken in this matter. The omission of a heading could be considered a scribal error or, since the previous sub-section was entitled 'In Craven', the scribe may have decided it unnecessary to repeat the heading.

However Poitou's total lands cannot be used to determine the extent of Craven for he also held lands between the Ribble and the Mersey together with Amounderness.

After 1102 Roger rebelled against the King, so Henry I of England confiscated his lands and gave those in upper Wharfedale and upper Airedale to the House of Romille and those in Ribblesdale and around Gisburn to the House of Percy. Sometime after Domesday Poitou had given Bowland to Robert de Lacy, the Baron of Pontefract. The king allowed him to keep Bowland and expanded his lands with the whole of Blackburnshire and part of Amounderness. These lands formed the basis of the Honour of Clitheroe.
