= Horton, Lancashire =

Village in Lancashire, England

Coordinates: 53.9484°N 2.2209°W

Horton
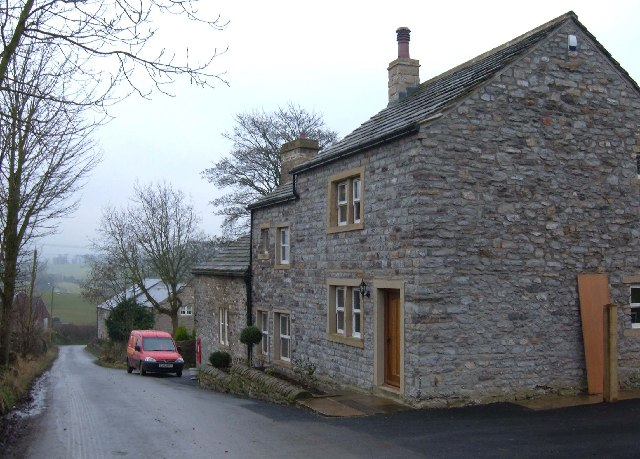
- Houses on Green Lane

- Shown within Ribble Valley Location within Lancashire
- Population: 76 (2001)
- Civil parish: Horton
- District: Ribble Valley
- Shire county: Lancashire
- Region: North West
- Country: England
- Sovereign state: United Kingdom
- Post town: Skipton
- Postcode district: BD23
- Dialling code: 01200
- Police: Lancashire
- Fire: Lancashire
- Ambulance: North West
- UK Parliament: Ribble Valley

Horton, historically known as Horton-in-Craven, is a village and a civil parish in the Ribble Valley district of the English county of Lancashire (historically in the West Riding of Yorkshire). Population details are now included in the civil parish of Newsholme. It is near the town of Barnoldswick. Horton has a place of worship, anciently called a chapelry or chapel of ease. For transport, there is the A59 nearby.

The parish adjoins the Ribble Valley parishes of Gisburn, Paythorne and Newsholme, the Pendle parish of Bracewell and Brogden and the parishes of Hellifield and Martons Both in the county of North Yorkshire. According to the census of 2001, the parish had a population of 76, however the United Kingdom Census 2011 grouped the parish with Newsholme and Paythorne (2001 pop. 50 and 95), giving a total of 253.

The name Horton is a common one in England. It derives from Old English horu 'dirt' and tūn 'settlement, farm, estate', presumably meaning 'farm on muddy soil'. This example is first attested in the Domesday Book of 1086. In the west of the parish in the Little Painley area, on high ground near the River Ribble, is the site of a Bronze Age Bowl barrow.

Horton was once a township in the ancient parish of Gisburn, in the Staincliffe Wapentake of the West Riding of Yorkshire. This became a civil parish in 1866, forming part of the Bowland Rural District from 1894 to 1974. It has since become part of the Lancashire borough of Ribble Valley.

Along with Rimington, Gisburn, Middop, Gisburn Forest, Paythorne and Newsholme, the parish forms the Gisburn, Rimington ward of Ribble Valley Borough Council.

The Pennine Bridleway National Trail and Ribble Way pass through the parish.

== Media gallery ==
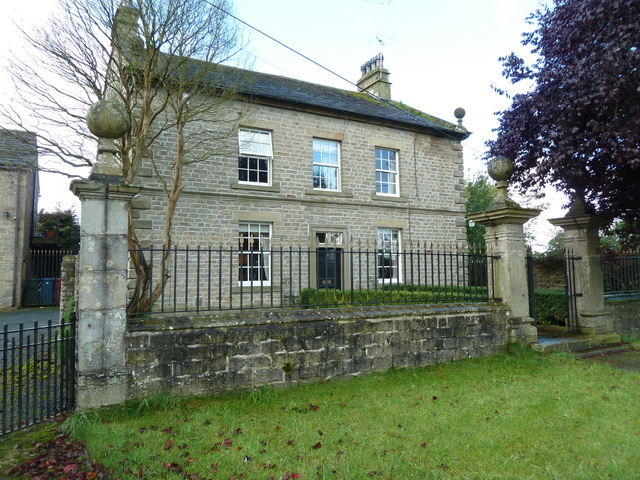
Horton House.

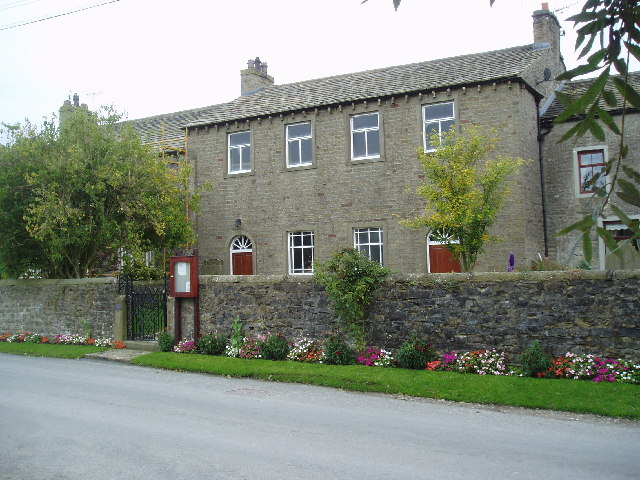
Higher Paradise Congregational Chapel.

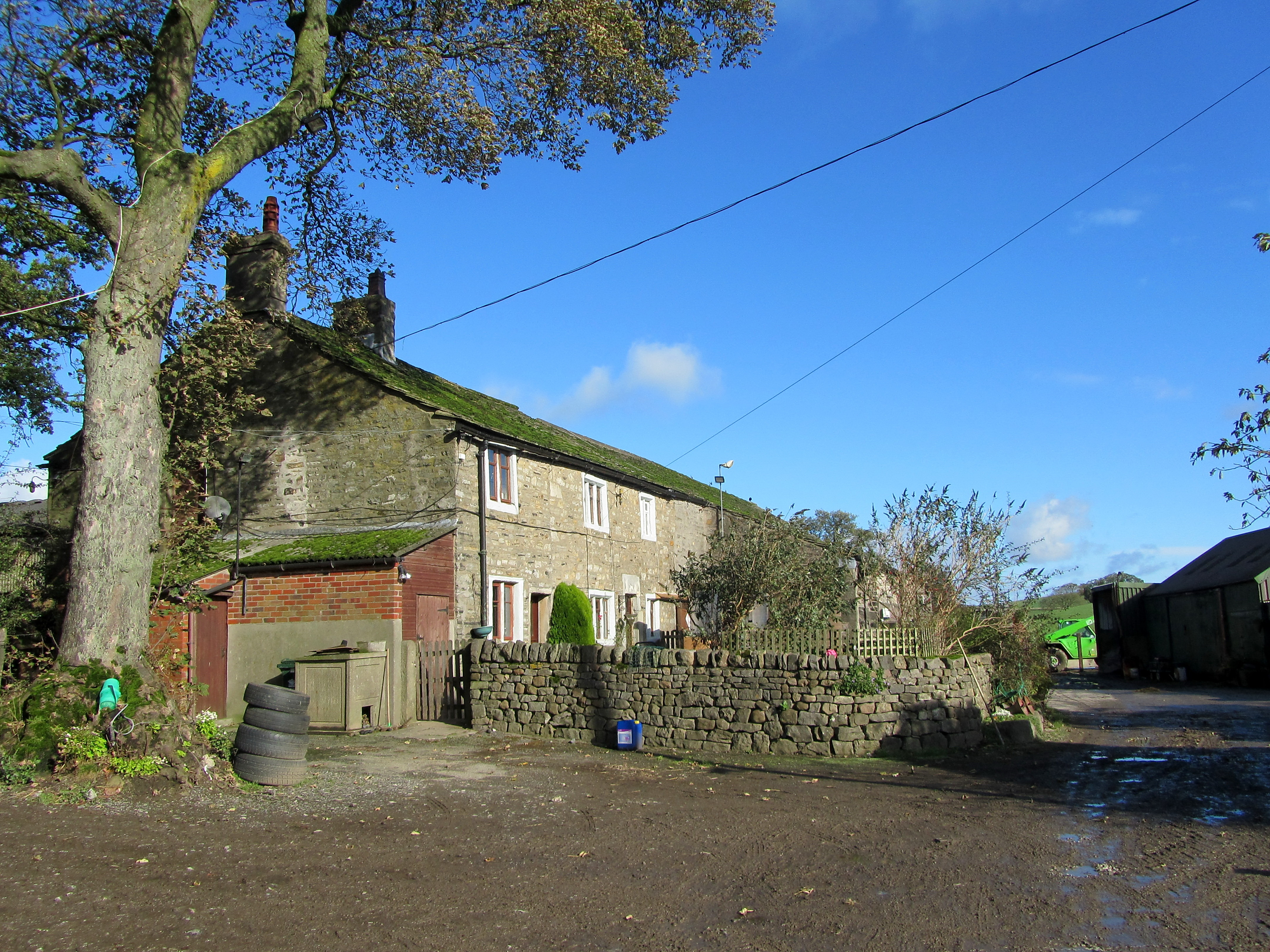
Hoober Farmhouse.

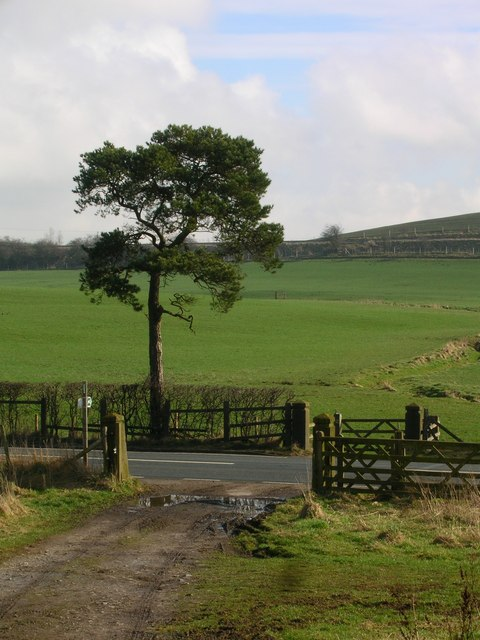
The A682 passes through the west of the parish, here joined by the Pennine Bridleway.

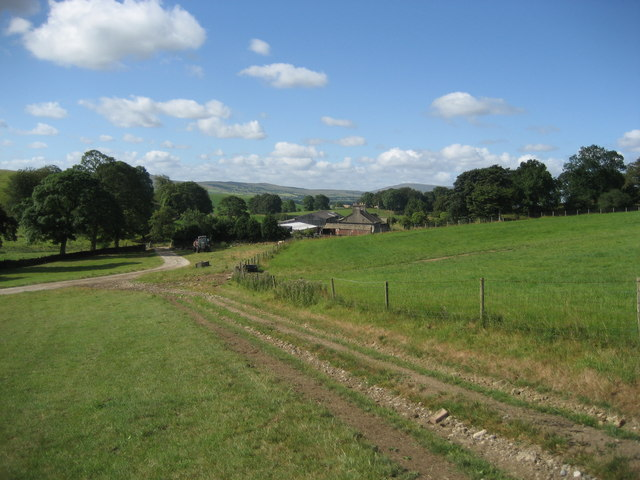
Horton Pasture Farm.

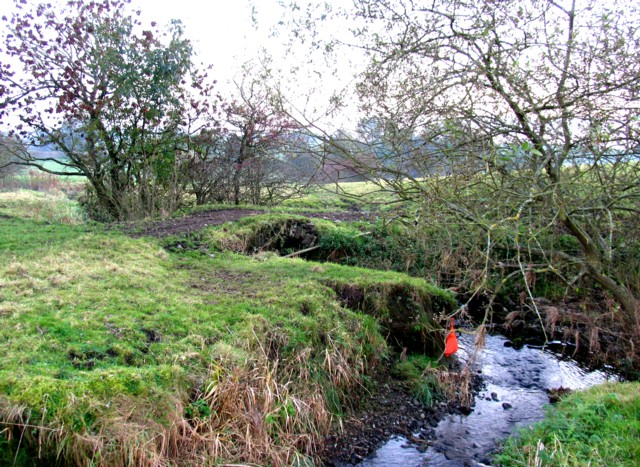
Horton Beck, a tributary of Stock Beck.

== See also ==
- Listed buildings in Horton, Lancashire
