= Hellifield Peel =

Building in Hellifield, North Yorkshire, England

Coordinates: 53°59′46″N 2°12′57″W

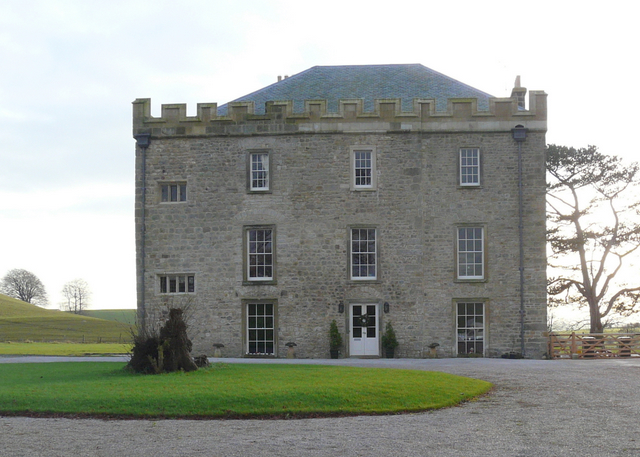
The building, in 2007

Hellifield Peel is a historic building in Hellifield, a village in North Yorkshire, in England.

The peel tower was constructed in the 14th century as a solar associated with a nearby aisled hall. In the following century was converted into a tower house. Licence to crenellate was granted in 1440. In the 17th century a west wing was added and the windows were altered, while in the late 18th century the angle between the west wing and the tower was filled in, and sash windows were installed. A servants' wing was added further to the west around this time, while a wing was added to the east in the early 20th century. During World War II, it was requisitioned in connection with a prisoner of war camp. After the war, the house was bought by the furniture maker Harry Lund, who stripped it of wood, and then sold the remaining fixtures. This left the building roofless, leading it to fall into ruin. It was grade II listed in 1958. In 2004, the ruin was bought by Francis and Karen Shaw for £165,000. They restored the building, other than the servants' wing and east wing, the work featuring on the television programme Grand Designs. In order to repay the cost of the work, they operated the house as a bed and breakfast.

The building is constructed of stone with a later embattled parapet, and has three storeys and three bays. The house contains windows with moulded surrounds, and in the left return are two staircase windows with chamfered surrounds, one with an ogee head. At the rear are two garderobe chutes.

== See also ==
- Listed buildings in Hellifield
