= Otterburn, North Yorkshire =

Village and civil parish in North Yorkshire, England

Coordinates: 54.01668°N 2.17982°W

Otterburn
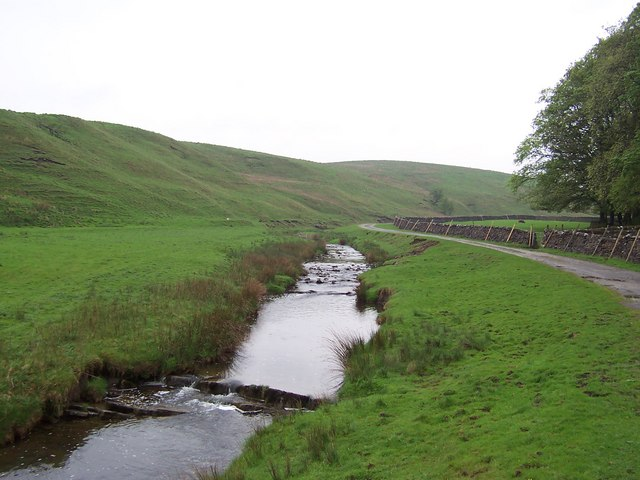
- Otterburn Beck, north of Otterburn

- Location within North Yorkshire
- OS grid reference: SD883578
- Civil parish: Otterburn
- Unitary authority: North Yorkshire
- Ceremonial county: North Yorkshire
- Region: Yorkshire and the Humber
- Country: England
- Sovereign state: United Kingdom
- Post town: SKIPTON
- Postcode district: BD23
- Police: North Yorkshire
- Fire: North Yorkshire
- Ambulance: Yorkshire

Otterburn (historically known as Otterburn-in-Craven) is a village and civil parish in the county of North Yorkshire, England. It is at OS Grid Reference SD8857, near Airton, Calton and the A65. The village is 9 miles (14 km) north west of Skipton and 1.9 miles (3 km) east of Hellifield.

At the 2011 census the population was less than 100, so the details are included in the civil parish of Airton.

== History ==
The village is mentioned in the Domesday Book, when it was listed as Otreburne and belonging to Roger de Poitou. The name Otterburn derives from Otter Stream, which is the beck that flows through the village. Otterburn Beck, as the stream is now known, drains a catchment covering over 7.3 square miles (19 km^{2}) and flows south east, covering a distance of 9.6 miles (15.5 km) before running into the River Aire at Bell Busk.

The low-lying pasture land between Otterburn and Bell Busk along which the Otterburn Beck travels, has been known to flood dramatically, with a particular great flood in July 1881. Speight postulates that the land is prone to flooding as it was the site of a lake in ancient times. As flooding here can have a detrimental effect on the downstream locations, it has been suggested as a possible tree-planting area to help alleviate flooding in times of high rainfall.

A Poll Tax in the 14th century determined that 14 families lived there with one being a blacksmith. It was also known as being the centrepoint of the Deanery of Craven. Historically, the land was divided between the monasteries of Fountains Abbey and Bolton Abbey. After the Dissolution of the Monasteries (c. 1538), the land was leased to John Lambert of Calton for 60 years.

In 1885, a large Neolithic barrow was discovered in a field to the south of the village. It was described as being perfectly circular and had a diameter of 30 yards (27 m). The site is now a scheduled ancient monument.

Otterburn was originally in the historic county of the West Riding of Yorkshire, but was moved into North Yorkshire when the boundary changes approved in 1973 came into effect in 1974. From 1974 to 2023 it was part of the Craven District, it is now administered by the unitary North Yorkshire Council.

As the population of the village numbered less than 100 people at the 2011 census, the village was included in the civil parish of Airton for census purposes. However, in 2015, North Yorkshire County Council estimated the population of the village to number 40 people, a drop from 50 recorded at the 2011 census.

== See also ==
- Listed buildings in Otterburn, North Yorkshire
