= Skipton Castle =

Medieval castle in Skipton, North Yorkshire, England

- Skipton, North Yorkshire, England
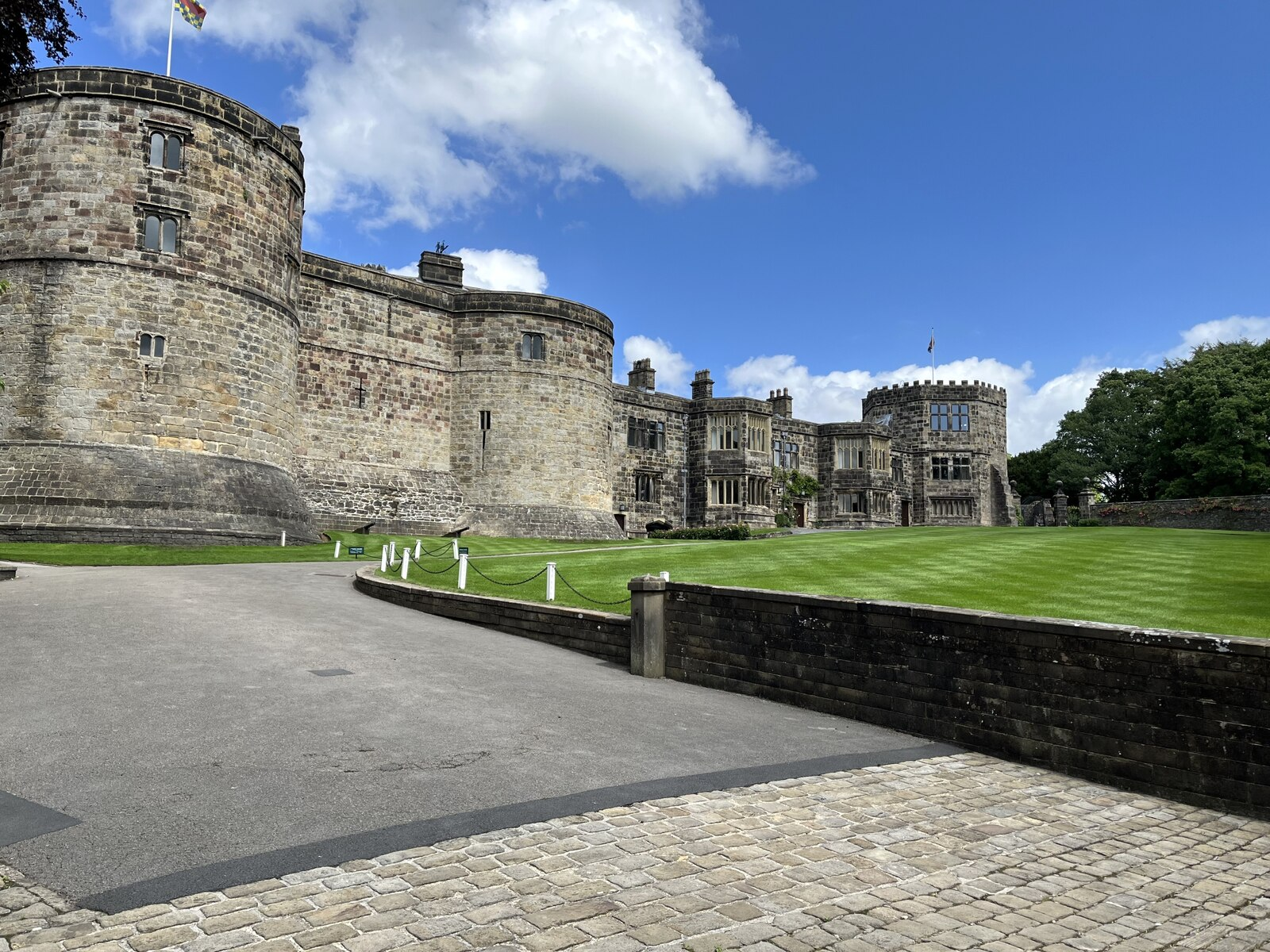
- A view of the castle

Site information
- Type: Castle
- Owner: The Fattorini family
- Open to the public: Yes
- Condition: Complete

Location
- Coordinates: 53°57′50″N 2°00′54″W

Site history
- Built: c. 1090
- Built by: Robert de Romille
- In use: Until December 1645
- Materials: millstone grit

Skipton Castle is a well-preserved Grade I Listed medieval castle in Skipton, North Yorkshire, England. It was built in 1090 by Robert de Romille, a Norman baron and is now a tourist attraction and private residence. It is located at the north end of Skipton's High Street.

== History ==
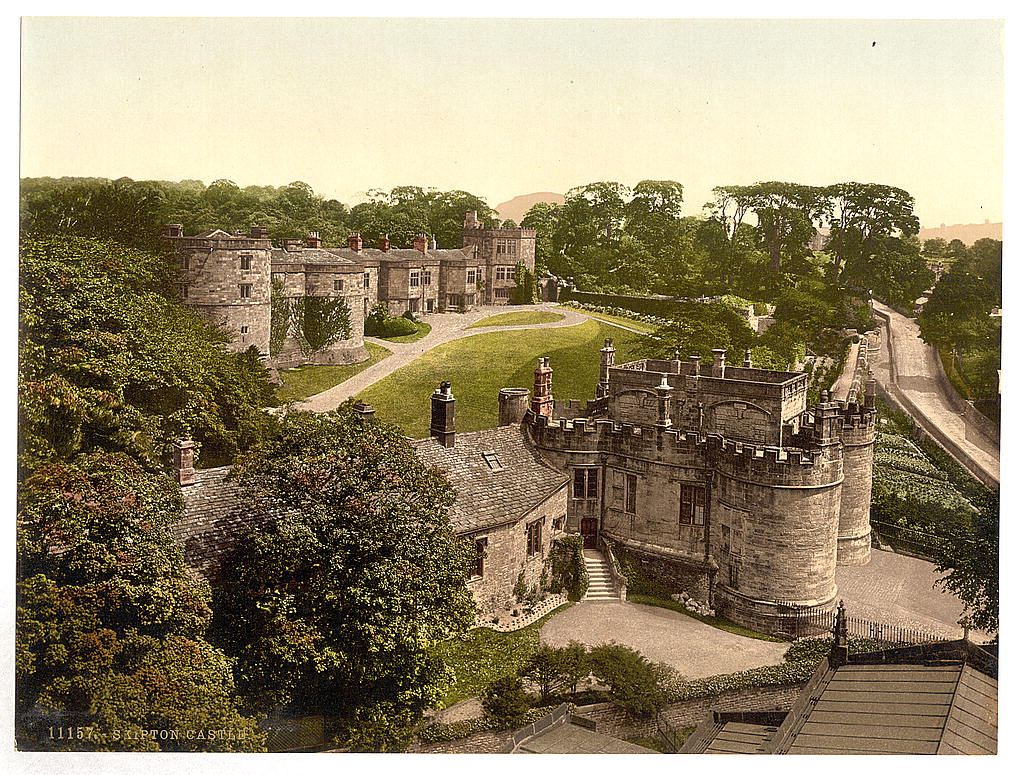
A colourised photochrom of Skipton Castle, c.1890–1900

Skipton Castle was originally a motte and bailey castle built in 1090 by Robert de Romille, lord of the multiple estates of Bolton Abbey. Shortly after 1102, Henry I extended Romille's lands to include all of upper Wharfedale and upper Airedale. The earth and wood castle was rebuilt in stone to withstand attacks by the Scots. Dropping down to Eller Beck, the cliffs behind the castle made it a perfect defensive structure. In 1310, after the Romille line had died out, Edward II granted the castle to Robert Clifford who was appointed Lord Clifford of Skipton and Guardian of Craven. Lord Clifford ordered many improvements to the fortifications, but he died in the Battle of Bannockburn in 1314 when the improvements were barely complete. Skipton was raided by the Scots during the Great Raid of 1322, yet the castle, with all its improvements, withstood the attack.

During the English Civil War, the castle was the last Royalist stronghold in the north of England to surrender, in December 1645. After a three-year siege, a surrender was negotiated on 21 December 1645 between Oliver Cromwell and the Royalists. Cromwell slighted the castle by ordering the removal of the roofs. Legend has it that during the siege, sheep fleeces were hung over the walls to deaden the impact from the rounds of cannon fire. Sheep fleeces feature in the town's coat of arms. Skipton remained the Cliffords' principal seat until 1676. Lady Anne Clifford (1590–1676) was the last Clifford to own the castle. After the siege, she ordered repairs and planted a yew tree in the central courtyard to commemorate its restoration after the war. Lady Anne's daughter, Lady Margaret Sackville (1614–1676), married John Tufton, 2nd Earl of Thanet (1609–1664), and the castle was then passed down through the Tufton family, becoming the seat of Lord Hothfield in 1871.

Reginaldus Flandrensis, who held an office of trust as Seneschal of Skipton Castle, witnessed a Skipton charter around 1130. "We must assume that these lands were given to him at about that time as a reward for his services. They amounted to 1 Knight's fee and 14 carucates, and were held under Skipton Castle for feudal service."

== Layout ==
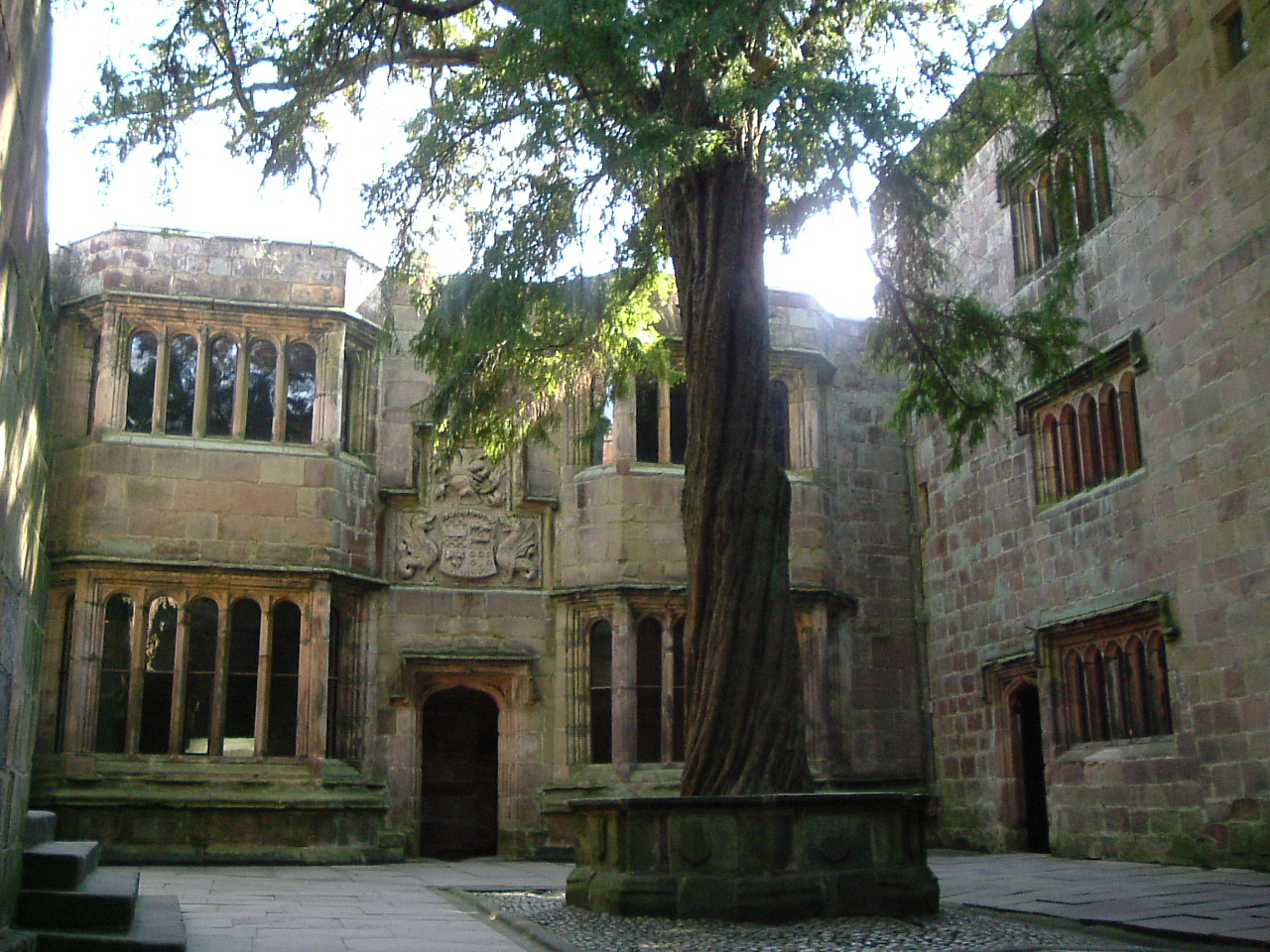
The Conduit Court and its yew tree

The castle has six fortified drum towers, with a domestic range connecting two towers on the northern side, protected by a precipice overlooking the Eller Beck. The first floor comprises the original kitchen, great hall, withdrawing rooms and the lord's bedchamber. New kitchens, storage and work cellars make up the ground floor. The remaining towers are military in nature and purpose. In the 16th and 17th centuries were added a new entrance staircase (replacing the original drawbridge), a further domestic wing, and larger windows in the original structure. The roof is fully intact. In the centre is a Tudor courtyard called the Conduit Court, which contains a yew tree, reputedly planted by Lady Anne in 1659.

The outer curtain wall encloses the inner wards and subsidiary buildings, including the ruins of a 12th-century chapel. The wall is mainly extant, and is pierced by a twin-towered Norman gatehouse. The east tower of the gatehouse contains a 17th-century shell grotto, one of two remaining grottos from this period (the other being at Woburn Abbey).

An ancient well may explain how the castle garrison survived the siege of 1643–1645.

== The castle today ==
The Fattorini family purchased the castle in 1956. The castle is the start of the 100-mile (160 km) Lady Anne's Way long-distance path to Penrith.

The castle gained free Wi-Fi as part of an internet connectivity effort in North Yorkshire.

== Gallery ==
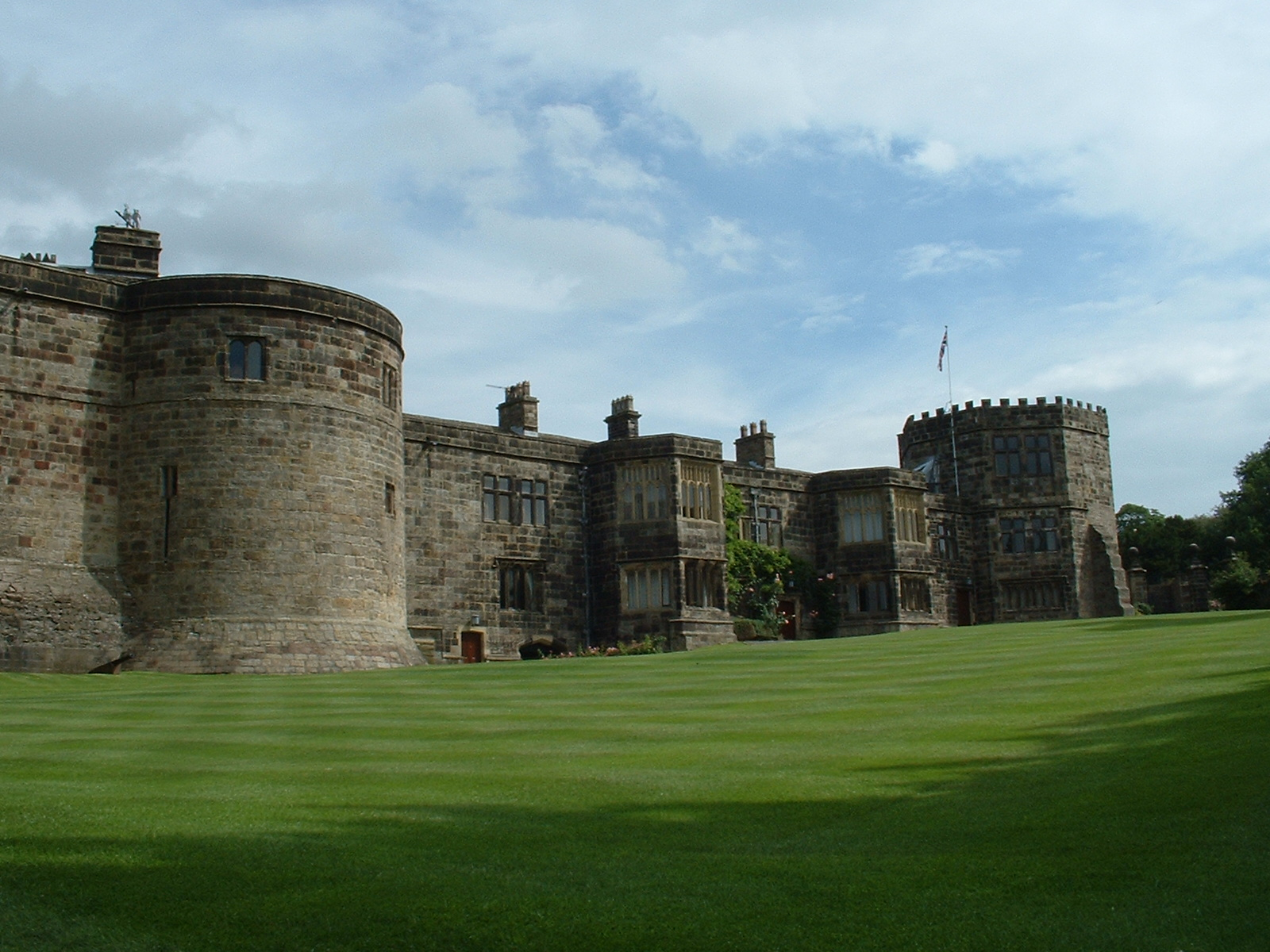
The Tudor Wing

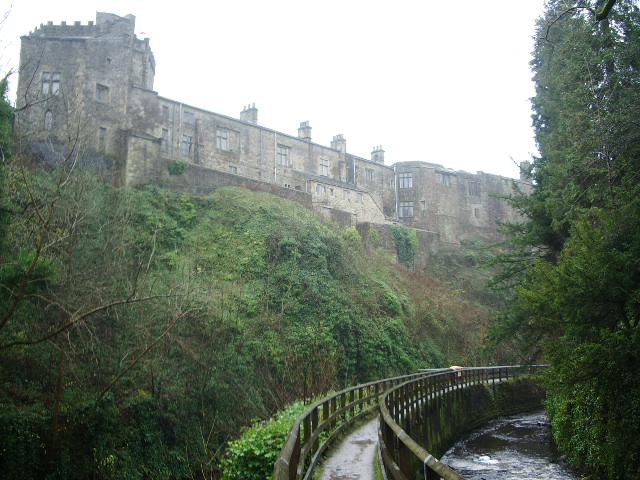
Skipton Castle seen from behind

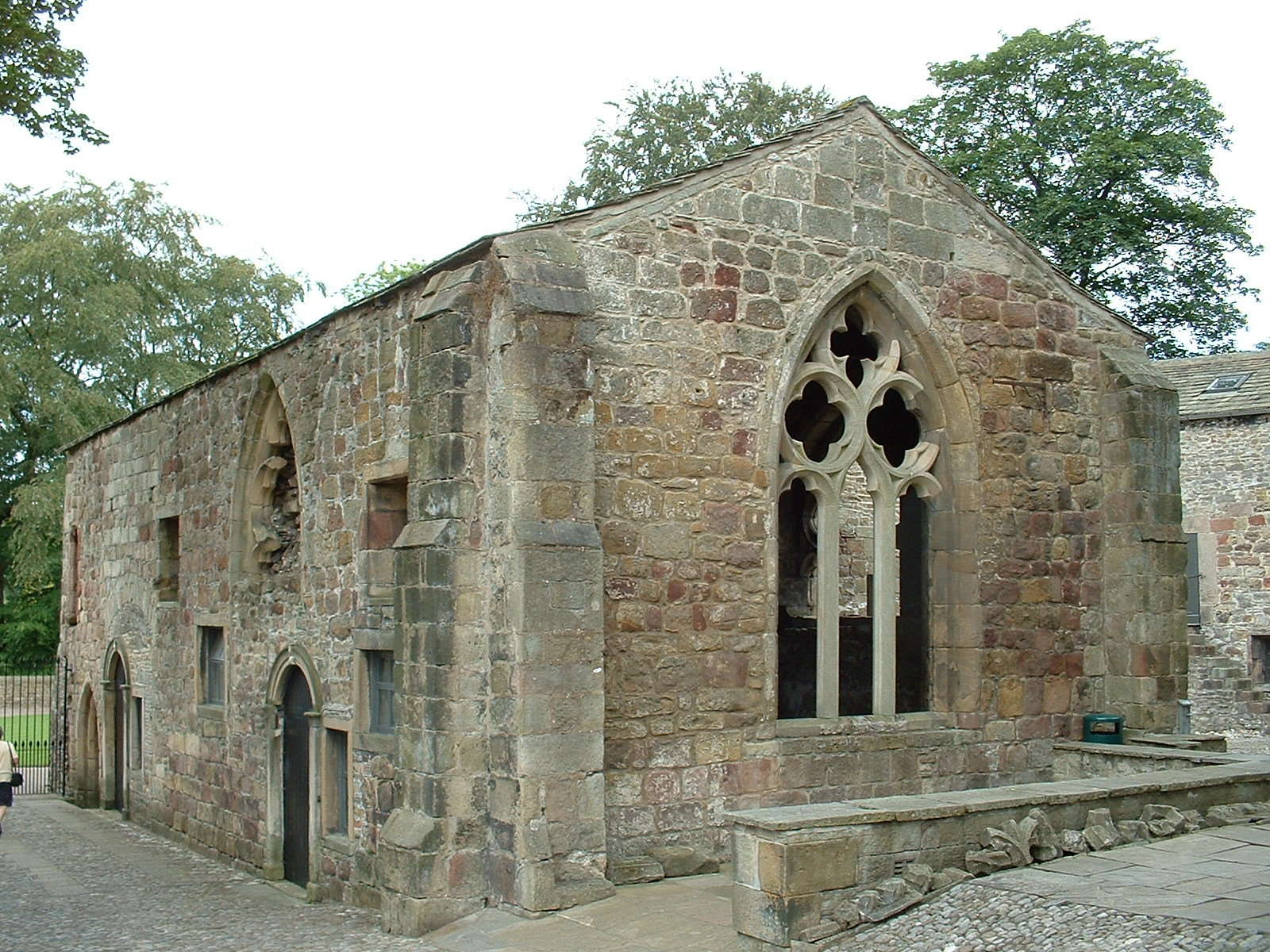
The 12th-century chapel of St John the Evangelist

== Burials ==
- Henry Clifford, 2nd Earl of Cumberland, in the family vault
- George Clifford, 3rd Earl of Cumberland, in the family vault

== See also ==
- History of Skipton
- Grade I listed buildings in North Yorkshire (district)
- Listed buildings in Skipton
