= St Aidan's Church, Hellifield =

Church in North Yorkshire, England

Coordinates: 54°00′15″N 2°13′13″W

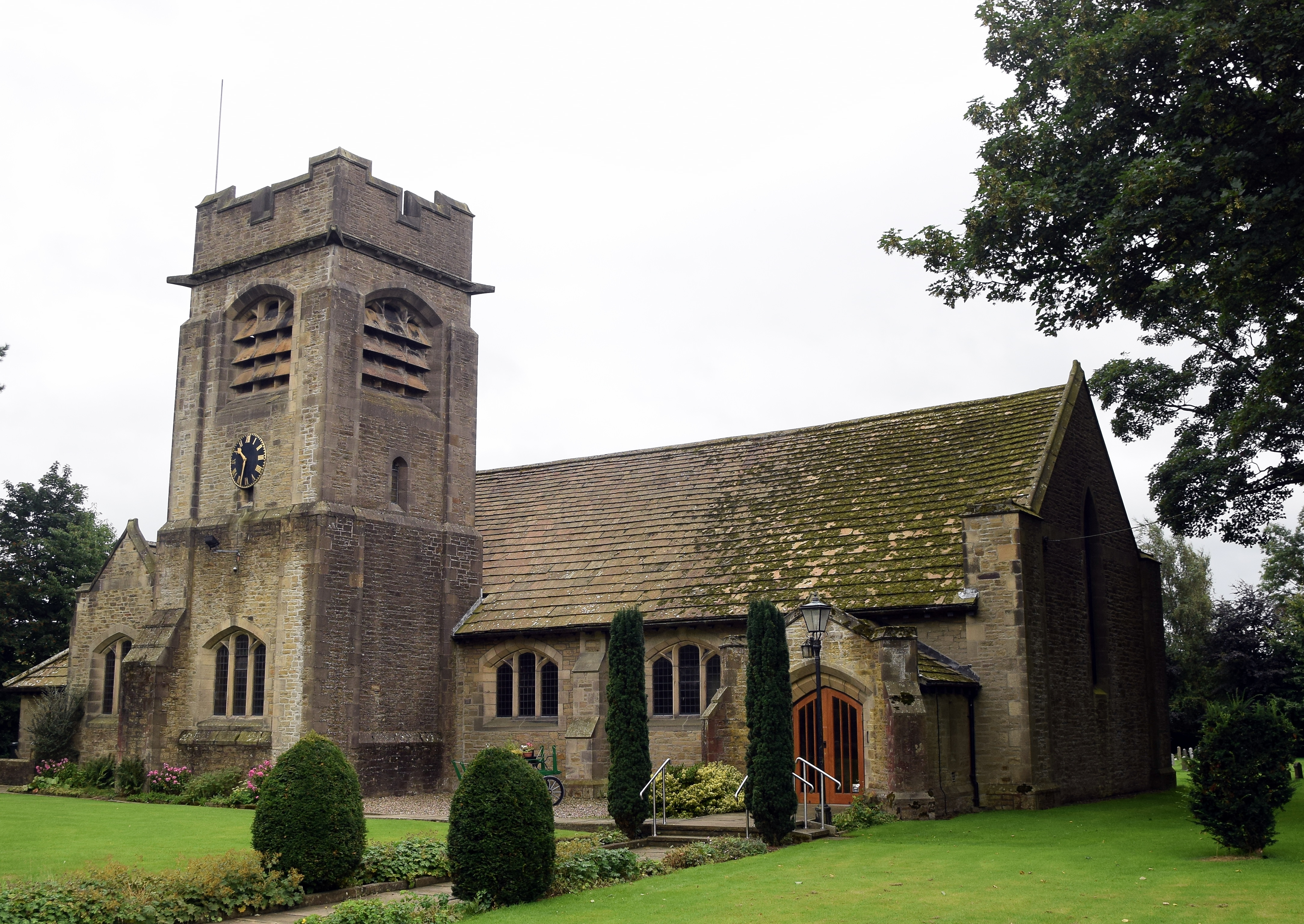
The church, in 2018

St Aidan's Church is the parish church of Hellifield, a village in North Yorkshire, in England.

Until the 20th century, Hellifield was in the parish of St Mary's Church, Long Preston. The church was designed by John Wreghitt Connon and Harry Sutton Chorley, and was constructed from 1905 to 1906. It is in the Neo Tudor style, and Nikolaus Pevsner describes it as "a successful design of its kind". It was grade II listed in 1987. In 2016, £8,000 was spent on removing the choir stalls and front two pews, to create a more flexible space, a carpeted platform with oak chairs.

The church is built of sandstone with a Westmorland slate roof, and consists of a nave, a north porch, a chancel with a north vestry, and a north tower. The tower has three stages, in the bottom stage is a three-light window with a pointed head, the second stage is recessed behind a splayed water table, and contains a lancet window, a clock face, and large bell openings with pointed head, and at the top is embattled machicolation.

== See also ==
- Listed buildings in Hellifield
