= Listed buildings in Otterburn, North Yorkshire =

Otterburn is a civil parish in the county of North Yorkshire, England. It contains four listed buildings that are recorded in the National Heritage List for England. All the listed buildings are designated at Grade II, the lowest of the three grades, which is applied to "buildings of national importance and special interest". The parish contains the village of Otterburn and the surrounding countryside. All the listed buildings are in the village, and consist of three houses and a bridge.

== Buildings ==
Name and location	Photograph	Date	Notes
Grove Farmhouse; 54.01670°N 2.18018°W	—	17th century	The house is in stone and has a coped stone slate roof with kneelers. There are two storeys, a main block of two bays, and a recessed right wing. The left bay in the main block is larger and contains mullioned windows. The right bay has a doorway with a fanlight and a pediment, and above it is a sash window. The windows in the wing are mullioned.
Otterburn Bridge; 54.01568°N 2.18004°W		Late 18th to early 19th century	The bridge carries Malham Road over Otterburn Beck. It is in stone, and consists of a single segmental arch springing from abutments treated as piers. The bridge has a solid parapet above a band, cranked over the arch.
Otterburn Hall; 54.01384°N 2.17814°W		Early 19th century	The house is in stone, with a slate roof, two storeys and three bays. The central doorway has pilasters, a fanlight, thin consoles and a pediment. The windows on the front are sashes, and at the rear they are mullioned.
Otterburn Lodge; 54.01403°N 2.18082°W	—	Early 19th century	The house is in stone, with a slate roof, two storeys and three bays. The doorway has a round head and a fanlight. The windows on the front are sash windows, and on the rear they are casements.
