= Arnford Farmhouse =

Listed building in North Yorkshire, England

General information
- Architectural style: West Riding vernacular / Post-Restoration
- Location: Hellifield, North Yorkshire, England
- Coordinates: 54.0023°N 2.2510°W
- Grid position: SD 83642 56279
- Construction started: c. 1700

Technical details
- Material: Stone rubble with millstone grit dressings and stone slate roof

Designations

Listed Building – Grade II*
- Designated: 20 February 1958
- Reference no.: 1317061

Arnford Farmhouse is a historic c. 1700 country house and Grade II* listed building situated in the parish of Hellifield, within the county of North Yorkshire, England.

The building is notable for its unusual design as a pair of semi-detached, mirror-image residences constructed under a single long roof structure—a rarity in contemporary Yorkshire Dales domestic architecture. Architectural historian Nikolaus Pevsner described Arnford Farmhouse as "a very remarkable building".

== History ==
=== Monastic origins ===
The settlement of Arnford (historically recorded as Arneforde) dates back to the medieval era, taking its name from the Old English for an eagle's river crossing. In the 12th century, the grange and pasture lands at Arnford belonged to the Cistercian monks of nearby Sawley Abbey, who farmed the estate until the Dissolution of the Monasteries in 1536.

=== 18th-century construction and dual tenure ===
The present farmhouse was built in approximately 1700 as two distinct, semi-detached dwellings designed symmetrically around a shared center axis. Agrarian historian Joan Thirsk noted that this mirrored layout strongly suggests the property was custom-built to accommodate two joint co-heirs dividing an inherited estate while sharing unified farm infrastructure.

In the 20th century, the partition was removed and the two dwellings were integrated into a single unified farmhouse.

=== Listing status ===
On 20 February 1958, Arnford Farmhouse was awarded Grade II* listed status by Historic England (List Entry 1317061), placing it among the top 5.8% of listed structures in England due to its high architectural significance and regional vernacular craftsmanship.

== Architecture ==
=== Structure and layout ===
Arnford Farmhouse is constructed of coursed local stone with fine millstone grit ashlar dressings, a stone slate roof, and stone coped gables fitted with carved kneelers. The building spans eight bays across two storeys.

=== Exterior features ===
The symmetrical facade reflects its mirror-image plan, each former house possesses a central doorway featuring a moulded stone surround, a pulvinated frieze, and a heavy moulded drip hood. The fenestration: on the facade features classic post-Restoration cross-windows framed with hood moulds. On the roofline there are gabled dormer windows featuring chamfered stone mullions, kneelers, and carved spike finials.

=== Interior ===
The interior retains a substantial historic inglenook fireplace and traditional timber framing dating to the original c. 1700 build.
