= Listed buildings in Paythorne =

Paythorne is a civil parish in Ribble Valley, Lancashire, England. It contains twelve listed buildings that are recorded in the National Heritage List for England. Of these, one is at Grade II*, the middle grade, and the others are at Grade II, the lowest grade. The parish contains the village of Paythorne, and is otherwise rural. Most of the listed buildings are houses, farmhouses, and farm buildings. The other listed buildings include two bridges, a church, a boundary stone, and a shelter for horses.

== Key ==
Grade	Criteria
II*	Particularly important buildings of more than special interest
II	Buildings of national importance and special interest

== Buildings ==
Name and location	Photograph	Date	Notes	Grade
Park House; 53.94306°N 2.29087°W	—	17th century	A house mainly in limestone with sandstone dressings and a slate roof in two storeys with a two-storey gabled porch. The outer doorway has a moulded surround and an elliptical head and moulded imposts, and the inner doorway has a chamfered surround and a Tudor arched head. The windows are mullioned with hoods.	II*
Paythorne Bridge; 53.95716°N 2.25895°W		17th century (probable)	The bridge carries a road over the River Ribble. It is in sandstone and consists of two segmental arches with two cutwaters on each side. The bridge has a solid parapet, coping, and piers at the ends. On the northwest approach are abutments largely in limestone that contain two arches for flood water. The bridge is also a scheduled monument.	II
Paa Farmhouse; 53.96722°N 2.24842°W	—	Late 17th century	The house is in pebbledashed stone with sandstone dressings and a stone-slate roof. There is a central two-storey porch, with one bay on each side. The windows are mullioned, the window in the porch being stepped with three lights. The doorway has a moulded surround, an elliptical head, and an inscribed lintel.	II
Windy Pike Farmhouse; 53.95221°N 2.27869°W	—	Late 17th century	A stone house with a modern tiled roof in two storeys. It has a two-storey gabled porch with a slate roof, and the doorway has a moulded surround and a shaped lintel. There are two bays to the left of the porch and one to the right. The windows are mullioned, the three-light window in the porch being stepped.	II
Ellenthorpe Farmhouse; 53.94515°N 2.27732°W		Mid 18th century	The farmhouse is in stone with a slate roof, and has two storeys and two bays. The windows are mullioned with three lights, and the doorway has a chamfered surround and a Tudor arched head. There is an outshut at the rear.	II
Gisburn Bridge; 53.94239°N 2.27296°W		18th century	The bridge carries Gisburn Road over the River Ribble. It is in sandstone, and consists of two segmental arches, with a floodwater arch at the southern end. The bridge has two triangular cutwaters, solid parapets, a string course, and weathered coping. The approaches have curved retaining walls.	II
Moor House Farmhouse and wall 53.95670°N 2.27701°W	—	Late 18th century	The house is in stone with sandstone dressings, quoins, and a slate roof. It has two storeys and a symmetrical three-bay front. The windows are mullioned, some containing sashes. In the centre is a porch with a moulded pediment. At the rear is a stair window with a semicircular head, and a re-used chamfered doorway with a triangular head. To the west is a limestone wall with sandstone dressings, a doorway, and four semicircular-arched recesses with a keystone and voussoirs.	II
Nappa Flats House and farm buildings 53.97789°N 2.22773°W		Late 18th century (probable)	The building is in stone with a stone-slate roof. The house has two storeys and three bays. The windows are mullioned; the light of one is a casement, and the others are sashes or are fixed. There are two doorways, both with plain surrounds, and one with two slates forming a hood. The house is flanked by two farm buildings, both of which have a door with a plain surround.	II
Huntsman's House; 53.94506°N 2.27812°W	—	c. 1800	The house, which was originally two houses, contains some 17th-century material. It is in stone with a stone-slate roof, and has two storeys and two bays. The windows have double-chamfered surrounds. The paired doorways have chamfered surrounds, that on the right having an inscribed lintel.	II
Paythorne Methodist Church; 53.96221°N 2.26129°W		1830	The church is in sandstone with a stone-slate roof, and has one storey and two bays. The windows are sashes with plain surrounds. Above the central doorway is an inscribed plaque.	II
Boundary stone 53.97547°N 2.27239°W	—	19th century	The stone marks the boundary between the parishes of Paythorne and Halton West. It is in sandstone, with a roughly rectangular plan, and is inscribed with the names of the parishes.	II
Horse shelter 53.94629°N 2.27617°W		19th century	A shelter for race horses in stone that has a slate roof with stone ridges. It has an octagonal plan, and contains two walls meeting at right angles, between which are round piers.	II
