= Listed buildings in Coniston Cold =

Coniston Cold is a civil parish in the county of North Yorkshire, England. It contains 13 listed buildings that are recorded in the National Heritage List for England. All the listed buildings are designated at Grade II, the lowest of the three grades, which is applied to "buildings of national importance and special interest". The parish contains the village of Coniston Cold, the hamlet of Bell Busk, and the surrounding countryside. Most of the listed buildings are houses, farmhouses and farm buildings, and the others include two bridges, an estate lodge and a church.

== Buildings ==
Name and location	Photograph	Date	Notes
Stainton Cotes; 53.98132°N 2.16488°W		17th century	The house is in stone with embattled gutters and a stone slate roof. There are two storeys and a south front of three bays. The outer bays are gabled and the left bay projects slightly. The windows are double-chamfered and mullioned, and in the left bay is a doorway with a chamfered surround, over which is a coat of arms. The east front has two bays, its windows have flat-faced mullions, and one sill has an inscribed name and date. The front contains a large shield with a coat of arms.
Stainton Cotes Farmhouse; 53.98137°N 2.16536°W	—	1666 (probable)	The farmhouse is in stone with quoins and a stone slate roof. There are two storeys, three bays, and a rear wing. On the front is a two-storey porch containing a doorway with a chamfered surround, and a coped gable with a ball finial. The windows are double-chamfered and mullioned, those in the ground floor with hood moulds.
Outbuilding, Bank Farm; 53.99053°N 2.15105°W	—	Late 17th century	The building is in stone, with pink sandstone quoins, and a stone slate roof. The gables are on the longer sides, and on the right is an outshut. The doorway is in the left gable side, there are three large round-headed chamfered vents, and a dovecote in the gable.
Lowlands Farmhouse; 53.99109°N 2.14819°W	—	c. 1700	The house is in stone with quoins and a stone slate roof. There are two storeys and four bays. The doorway is near the centre, and there is a blocked doorway with a chamfered basket-arched head. Some windows are double-chamfered, and others are sashes.
Old Post Office; 53.99105°N 2.14765°W	—	Late 17th or early 18th century	The house is in stone with a stone slate roof. There are three bays under a continuous roof, with two storeys on the left and one on the right, and an outshut on the left. The doorway has a plain surround, and the windows are sashes, most with plain surrounds, the window in the outshut with a chamfered surround. There is also a blocked circular window.
Raven Flatt Farmhouse and barn 54.00578°N 2.15107°W		Late 17th or early 18th century	The farmhouse and barn are in one range, they are rendered and have a stone slate roof. The farmhouse has two storeys and three bays. On the front is a full height gabled porch, containing a doorway in the left return with a Tudor arch and hollow spandrels. To the left is another doorway, with a chamfered surround, flanked by chamfered mullioned windows under a common hood mould, and there are similar windows elsewhere. In the barn is a segmental cart entry.
Hill Top Farmhouse; 53.99213°N 2.15206°W	—	Early 18th century	The farmhouse, which was extended in the 19th century, is in stone with a stone slate roof. There are two storeys, the earlier part has three bays, and the lower extension to the right has two bays. On the front is a gabled porch, and the windows, some of which have been altered, are double-chamfered.
Bell Busk Bridge; 54.00352°N 2.14586°W		Mid 18th century	The bridge carries Mark House Lane over the River Aire. It is in stone with some concrete, and consists of three segmental arches. The bridge has triangular cutwaters, and bands outside the voussoirs. The central arch has radiating consoles formed from the voussoirs, and the solid parapet has been cantilevered out on a widened concrete roadway.
Church Close Farmhouse; 53.99141°N 2.14828°W		Early 19th century	A stone house with quoins, and a stone slate roof with copings and kneelers. There are two storeys and five bays. The doorway has a rectangular fanlight, and the windows are sashes in plain surrounds.
Eshbottom Farmhouse and barn 54.00139°N 2.14806°W		Early 19th century	The farmhouse and the barn, which may be earlier, are in stone, the farmhouse whitewashed, and they have a stone slate roof. The farmhouse has two storeys, two bays and a rear outshut. It contains a central doorway and sash windows. The barn projects, and has a front outshut, and there are three doorways in the gable end.
Red Bridge; 54.00384°N 2.14740°W		Early 19th century	The bridge carries Mark House Lane over Otterburn Beck. It is in stone and consists of a single segmental arch. The bridge has rusticated voussoirs, a band, and a parapet swept out and ending in circular piers with domical caps.
Coniston Hall Lodge; 53.99325°N 2.15864°W		c. 1840	The lodge to Coniston Hall, now demolished, was designed by George Webster. It is in stone, with a floor band, an eaves cornice, and a slate roof. There are two storeys and a T-shaped plan. On the front is a Greek Doric porch with freestanding columns, and the windows are sashes.
St Peter's Church; 53.99434°N 2.14961°W		1841–46	The church, designed by George Webster in Early English style, is in stone with a stone slate roof. It consists of a single cell with four bays, and a west steeple. The steeple has a tower with three stages and a south doorway. The top stage is splayed to become octagonal, it contains small louvred bell openings, and is surmounted by a short octagonal spire. There are buttresses between the bays, and angle buttresses on the corners and the tower.
