= Listed buildings in Horton, Lancashire =

Horton is a civil parish in Ribble Valley, Lancashire, England. It contains 14 listed buildings that are recorded in the National Heritage List for England. Of these, one is at Grade II*, the middle grade, and the others are at Grade II, the lowest grade. The parish contains the village of Horton, surrounding countryside, and part of the grounds of Gisburne Park. Most of the listed buildings are houses and associated structures, farmhouses and farm buildings. The other listed buildings include a bridge, a chapel, a boundary stone, and a milestone.

== Key ==
| Grade | Criteria |
|---|---|
| II* | Particularly important buildings of more than special interest |
| II | Buildings of national importance and special interest |

== Buildings ==
| Name and location | Photograph | Date | Notes | Grade |
|---|---|---|---|---|
| Horton Hall and barn 53.95008°N 2.22682°W | — | Early 17th century (probable) | The house and barn are in stone, mainly sandstone, with sandstone dressings and a stone-slate roof. The house has two storeys and three bays with mullioned windows. In the front is a two-storey gabled porch and a doorway with a plain surround. To the left is a barn that has a wide entrance with long-and-short jambs, and a segmental arch with an inscribed keystone. | II* |
| Horton Grange Farmhouse; 53.94657°N 2.22114°W | — | Late 17th century | The farmhouse is rendered with a stone-slate roof, a T-shaped plan, and two storeys with attics. The front range has three bays, and contains sash windows, some of which are mullioned. Also on the front are canted bay windows, and a doorway with Tuscan pilasters, a semicircular head with a fanlight, a broken fluted frieze, and an open pediment. The rear wing contains mullioned windows, a stepped window in the attic, a doorway with a chamfered surround and an elliptical head, and a ball finial on the apex of the gable. | II |
| Pasture House Farmhouse; 53.95326°N 2.19463°W | — | Late 17th century | A rendered house with a stone-slate roof, in two storeys. The windows are mullioned. There are two doorways, one with a chamfered surround, the other with a plain surround and a hood of two pitched slates. | II |
| Horton House; 53.94832°N 2.22124°W | | Mid 18th century | A sandstone house with a stone-slate roof, quoins, and ball finials on the corners. It has two storeys with attics, and a symmetrical three-bay front. The windows in the front are artificial sashes, and the doorway has a repaired architrave. At the rear are mullioned windows, a cross window, and a window with mullions and transoms. | II |
| Wall, gate and railings, Horton House; 53.94844°N 2.22118°W | | Mid 18th century | The wall and gate piers are in sandstone and the gate and railings are in iron. There are two central gate piers with a square plan, moulded bases, friezes, cornices, and ball finials. Low walls with railings join these piers to lower and slimmer, but otherwise similar, end piers. | II |
| Keepers Cottages; 53.94259°N 2.26382°W | — | Mid 18th century | A pair of houses treated as pavilions, linked by a wall. They are in stone and have roofs of slate and stone-slate. The houses have two storeys, with one bay each, and contain sash windows with semicircular heads. They also have gables treated as open pediments. The linking wall is in two storeys and contains modern windows. | II |
| Poultry House Bridge; 53.94297°N 2.26465°W | | Mid 18th century (probable) | The bridge carries Park Road over the Stock Beck, a tributary of the River Ribble. It is in stone, and consists of a single narrow segmental arch. The bridge has solid parapets with chamfered copings. | II |
| The Temple; 53.94486°N 2.26612°W | — | Mid 18th century (probable) | A summer house in the grounds of Gisburne Park, in limestone with sandstone dressings and a slate roof. It has a single storey, and a Venetian doorway with Tuscan columns and an open pediment. At the rear is a doorway with a semicircular head. | II |
| Hoober Farmhouse; 53.95462°N 2.22889°W | | Late 18th century | A stone house with a stone-slate roof, in two storeys and three bays. The windows have plain surrounds and are mullioned. There are two doorways, one with a plain surround, the other with a chamfered surround and a re-used lintel. | II |
| Horton Grange Cottage; 53.94743°N 2.22107°W | — | Late 18th century | The house is in stone with a stone-slate roof, in two storeys and four bays. The windows are mullioned, some with sashes. One of the doorways has a plain surround, and the other has a chamfered surround and a Tudor arched head. | II |
| Boundary stone 53.95242°N 2.18442°W | — | Late 18th or early 19th century | The stone marks the boundary between the parishes of Horton and Martons Both. It consists of a round-headed stone with an inscription. | II |
| Sunny Bank; 53.94804°N 2.22058°W | | c. 1800 | A limestone house with sandstone dressings and a stone-slate roof, in two storeys and three bays. The windows are mullioned, and contain sashes, or casements imitating sashes. The central doorway has a plain surround, a semicircular head with a keystone, impost blocks, and a fanlight. | II |
| Congregational Chapel; 53.94793°N 2.22058°W | | 1812 | The chapel is in sandstone with a stone-slate roof, in two storeys and four bays. The windows have plain surrounds. There are doorways in the outer bays; these have plain surrounds, with semicircular heads, projecting keystones, impost blocks, and fanlights. At the rear are windows with pointed heads, and inside the chapel are galleries on three sides. | II |
| Milestone; 53.94803°N 2.19706°W | — | c. 1900 (probable) | The milestone is in cast iron on a sandstone base. The lower part is triangular, and the upper part is rectangular with a semicircular top. The inscriptions include the distances in miles to Clitheroe and Skipton. | II |
