= Richard Wright (cricketer, born 1877) =

English cricketer and educator

Personal information
- Full name: Richard Gane Wright
- Born: 1 January 1877; Gisburn, Yorkshire, England
- Died: 27 October 1942 (aged 65); Cookham, Berkshire, England
- Batting: Unknown

Domestic team information
- Years: Team
- 1896–1898: Hertfordshire
- 1922/23: Europeans

Career statistics
Competition	First-class
Matches	1
Runs scored	18
Batting average	18.00
100s/50s	–/–
Top score	18
Catches/stumpings	–/–
- Source: Cricinfo, 2 July 2019

Richard Gane Wright (1 January 1877 – 27 October 1942) was an English first-class cricketer and educator.

The son of Richard Wright senior and his wife, Anne Maria Jones, Wright was born on New Year's Day in 1877 at Gisburn, Yorkshire. He later went up to Queens' College at the University of Cambridge, graduating in 1902. He played minor counties cricket for Hertfordshire from 1896–98, making six appearances in the Minor Counties Championship. He served in the Indian Education Service in British India, where he was the assistant principle of Aitchison College in Lahore. While in India, Wright made a single appearance in first-class cricket for the Europeans against the Muslims at Lahore in 1923. Batting once in the match, he was dismissed for 18 runs in the Europeans first-innings by Saleh Mohammad. He had married Gladwys Chaning-Pearce at Colombo in 1910; however she died at Lahore in 1918. The following year he married her sister, Rosella Lois Chaning-Pearce. Wright died in October 1942, at Cookham, Berkshire.
