= St Peter's Church, Coniston Cold =

Church in Coniston Cold, North Yorkshire, England

Coordinates: 53°59′40″N 2°08′59″W

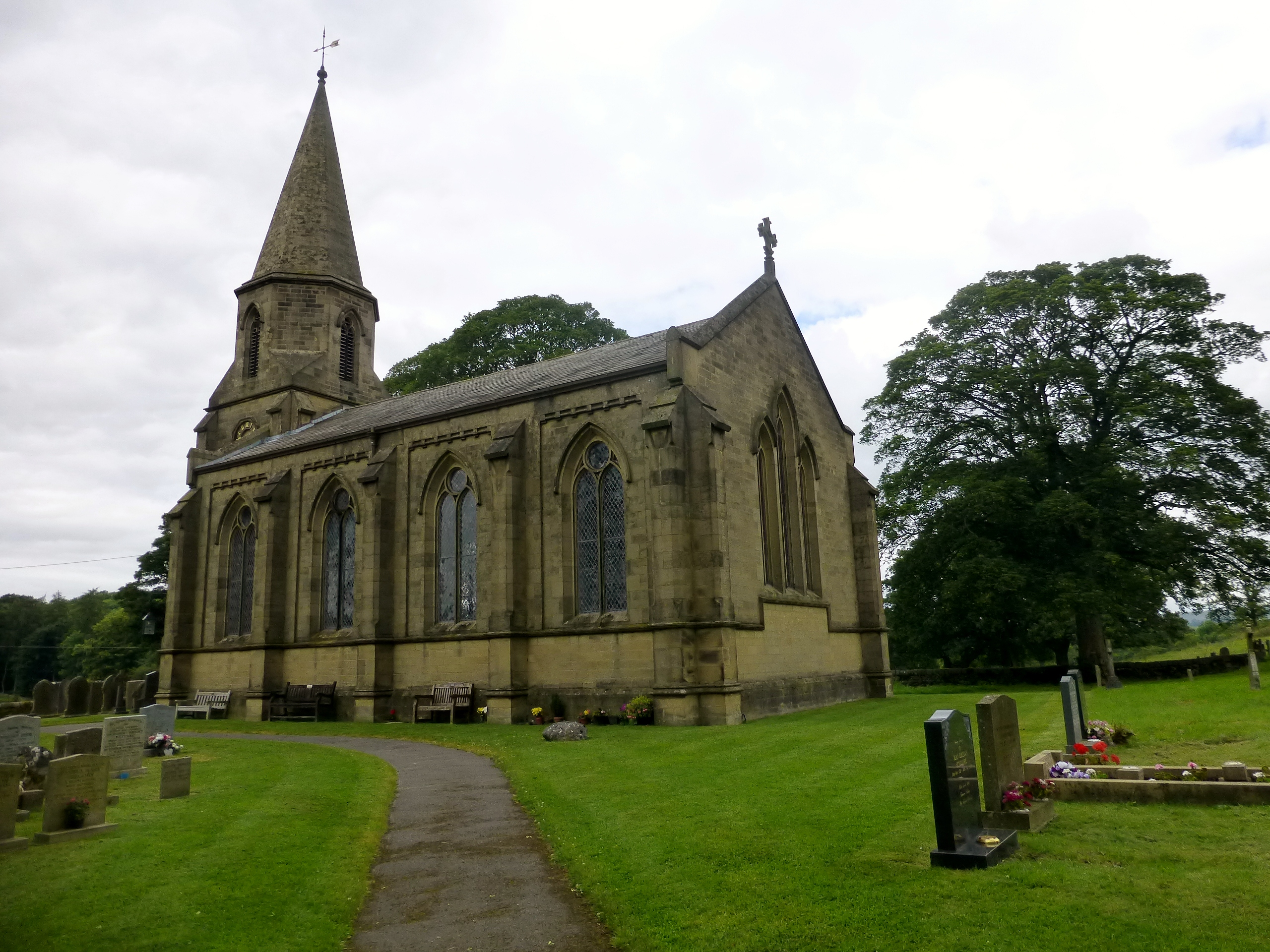
The church, in 2014

St Peter's Church is an Anglican church in Coniston Cold, a village in North Yorkshire, in England.

The church was designed in the Early English by George Webster, on land donated by James Braithwaite Garforth. It was completed in 1846 and dedicated in 1847, and was soon given its own parish. This survived until 1987, when it was placed in the parish of St Michael's Church, Kirkby Malham. The church was Grade II listed in 1989. In 2008, it was moved back into the parish of Gargrave.

The church is built of stone, with a stone slate roof. It consists of a single cell with four bays, and a west steeple. The steeple has a tower with three stages and a south doorway. The top stage is splayed to become octagonal, it contains small louvred bell openings, and is surmounted by a short octagonal spire. There are buttresses between the bays, and angle buttresses on the corners and the tower. Inside, there is a triple-decker pulpit, and under the tower there is a small organ gallery. There is a braced king post roof, and the glass is clear latticework.

== See also ==
- Listed buildings in Coniston Cold
