= Swinden =

Village in North Yorkshire, England

Coordinates: 53.98526°N 2.21343°W

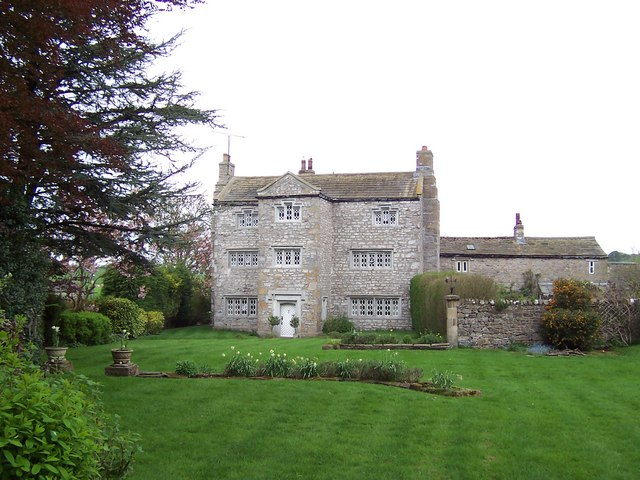
- Swinden Hall, built in 1657

- Location within North Yorkshire
- Population: 20
- OS grid reference: SD861543
- Civil parish: Hellifield
- Unitary authority: North Yorkshire
- Ceremonial county: North Yorkshire
- Region: Yorkshire and the Humber
- Country: England
- Sovereign state: United Kingdom
- Post town: Skipton
- Postcode district: BD23
- Police: North Yorkshire
- Fire: North Yorkshire
- Ambulance: Yorkshire
- UK Parliament: Skipton and Ripon

Swinden is a village in the civil parish of Hellifield, in North Yorkshire, England. It is near Halton West and Nappa and about 7 miles (11 km) north of Barnoldswick. The population was estimated at 20 in 2010.

Swinden was historically a township in the ancient parish of Gisburn in the West Riding of Yorkshire. It became a separate civil parish in 1866. It was transferred to the new county of North Yorkshire in 1974. The civil parish was abolished on 1 April 2014 and amalgamated with the parish of Hellifield. From 1974 to 2023 it was part of the Craven District, it is now administered by the unitary North Yorkshire Council.

== See also ==
- Listed buildings in Hellifield
