= Coniston Cold =

Village and civil parish in North Yorkshire, England

Coordinates: 53°59′29″N 2°09′00″W

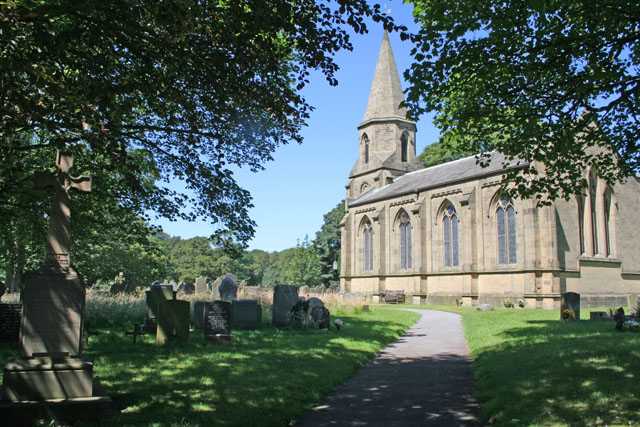
- St Peter's Church

- Location within North Yorkshire
- Population: 203 (2011 census)
- OS grid reference: SD 903 550
- Civil parish: Coniston Cold
- Unitary authority: North Yorkshire
- Ceremonial county: North Yorkshire
- Region: Yorkshire and the Humber
- Country: England
- Sovereign state: United Kingdom
- Post town: SKIPTON
- Postcode district: BD23
- Dialling code: 01756
- Police: North Yorkshire
- Fire: North Yorkshire
- Ambulance: Yorkshire
- UK Parliament: Skipton and Ripon

Coniston Cold is a village and civil parish in the county of North Yorkshire, England. The village lies 7 miles (11 km) north-west of Skipton along the A65.

It was historically part of the Staincliffe Wapentake of the West Riding of Yorkshire. From 1974 to 2023 it was part of the Craven District, it is now administered by the unitary North Yorkshire Council.

St Peter's Church, Coniston Cold, was built in 1846.

According to the 2001 UK census, Coniston Cold parish had a population of 186, increasing to 203 at the 2011 Census.

== See also ==
- Listed buildings in Coniston Cold
