= Gisburn =

Village in Lancashire, England

Coordinates: 53.932°N 2.265°W

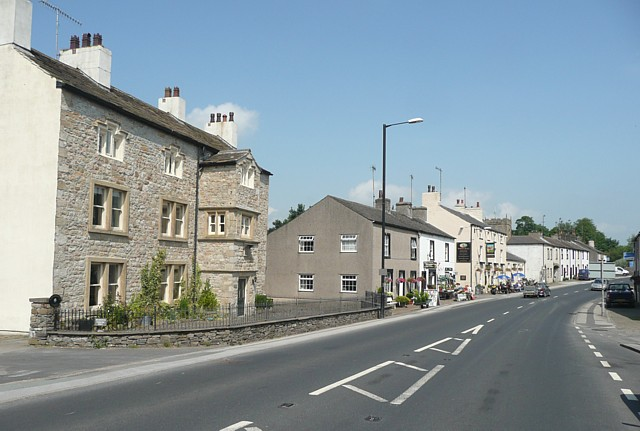
- Main Street, showing the former Ribblesdale Arms public house, built 1635

- Shown within Ribble Valley Location within Lancashire
- Population: 521 (2011 Census)
- OS grid reference: SD825485
  - London: 190 miles (306 km) SSE
- Civil parish: Gisburn
- District: Ribble Valley
- Shire county: Lancashire
- Region: North West
- Country: England
- Sovereign state: United Kingdom
- Post town: CLITHEROE
- Postcode district: BB7
- Dialling code: 01200
- Police: Lancashire
- Fire: Lancashire
- Ambulance: North West
- UK Parliament: Ribble Valley

Gisburn (formerly Gisburne) is a village and civil parish within the Ribble Valley borough of Lancashire, England. Historically within the West Riding of Yorkshire, it lies 8 miles (13 km) northeast of Clitheroe and 11 miles (18 km) west of Skipton. The civil parish had a population of 506, recorded in the 2001 census, increasing to 521 at the 2011 Census.

The civil parish adjoins the Ribble Valley parishes of Horton, Paythorne, Sawley and Rimington and the Pendle parish of Bracewell and Brogden.

== Toponymy ==
Gisburn is first named in the Domesday Book of 1086, where it takes the form Ghiseburne. The name is next attested in the twelfth century, as Giselburn. The name is thus thought to originate in the reconstructed Old English word *gysel ('gushing') and the common Old English word burna ('stream'). It is possible, however, that the first element was originally an Old English personal name *Gysla. Thus the name once meant either 'gushing stream' or 'Gysla's stream'.

The former spelling of Gisburne was phased out after the introduction of railways in the parish. Gisburn railway station was closed under the Beeching Axe in 1962. Gisburne and similar spellings were also sometimes used for Guisborough, also in Yorkshire (now in North Yorkshire), leading to Gisburn often being referred to as "Gisburn in Craven".

== Geography ==
Gisburn lies within a rural area, surrounded by hilly and relatively unpopulated areas, with Bowland Forest to the west, Pendle Hill to the south, and the Yorkshire Dales and Pennines not far to the north and east. The relatively flat Ribble valley runs through the parish with the A59 running parallel.

== History ==
Gisburn's ancient parish boundaries are shown in purple, broken into its modern civil parishes. The modern civil parish is shaded blue. This map illustrates Gisburn's administrative geography: the historic boundaries of Lancashire (in red) exclude the village, whereas the boundaries of the ceremonial county (in green) include it.

The old Roman road from Ribchester to Ilkley passes to the south of the modern civil parish, with the remains of a 4th-century Romano-British farmstead known as Bomber Camp located just over the boundary with Bracewell and Brogden.

The layout of this linear village, with properties facing the main street and tenement plots running down to a back lane, is common of many established in the tenth century.

The manor of Gisburn was part of the Percy Fee which was listed under Craven in the Domesday Book. In the 1140s, William de Percy II, granted the Dudland area, in the southwest of the parish, to the Cistercian monks who founded Sawley Abbey. And in 1242, William de Percy, 6th Baron Percy donated the manor. By 1571, the manor was among the former monastic lands owned by Henry Darcy, the son of Sir Arthur Darcy. He sold it to William Lister.

Gisburn was the centre of a large ancient parish, which also included the townships of Gisburn Forest, Paythorne, Newsholme, Horton, Rimington, Middop, Nappa and Swinden.

In 1612 a village resident, Jennet Preston, was tried at the Lancashire witch trials, accused of causing the death of Thomas Lister by witchcraft. Her trial took place in York as the village then lay within Yorkshire. Preston was found guilty and was hanged at York Knavesmire.

Markets were held on Main Street until 1911, when the livestock market moved to its present site at the western end of the village next to the former railway station.

The Pennine Bridleway National Trail and Ribble Way pass through the parish, with former crossing Gisburne Park and the latter following roads through the village.

== Governance ==
Gisburn was historically part of the West Riding of Yorkshire, within the Deanery of Craven, and Wapentake of Staincliffe. All these townships became separate civil parishes in 1866, and all except two became part of Bowland Rural District when it was formed in 1894. Gisburn and the other parishes of Bowland Rural District were transferred from Yorkshire to Lancashire in 1974. Nappa and Swinden became part of Settle Rural District in 1894, and remained in Yorkshire in 1974 as part of the new county of North Yorkshire.

The civil parish previously had a detached area on the western side of Sawley, with a larger part of that parish on the southern side of Gisburn. In 1938 these areas were joined with the respective parishes.

Along with Rimington, Middop, Gisburn Forest, Paythorne, Newsholme and Horton, the parish forms the Gisburn, Rimington ward of Ribble Valley Borough Council. The ward had a population of 1287 in 2001, rising to 1405 in 2011. The ward elects a single councillor, who currently is Charles McFall of the Conservative Party.

== Landmarks ==
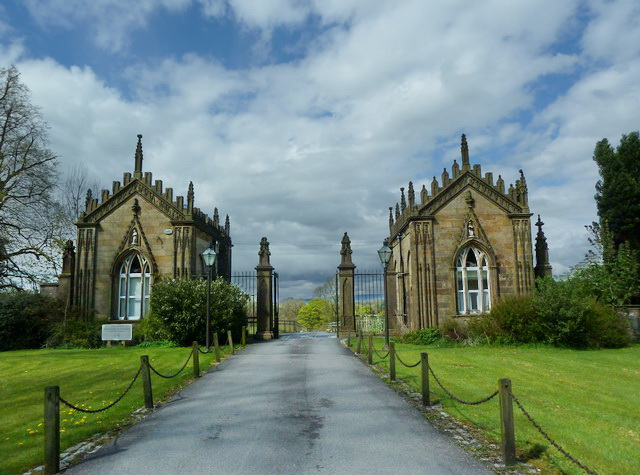
The entrance to Gisburne Park

=== Gisburne Park ===
To the north of the village, between it and the River Ribble is a 68 hectares (168 acres) 18th-century former deer park and country house, today used as a private hospital, equestrian centre and the Ribblesdale Holiday Park.

The present Grade I listed house, was originally constructed between 1727 and 1736 by Thomas Lister and has been since extended. The Lister family produced a number of Members of Parliament for Clitheroe and later Barons Ribblesdale, and had been previously based at Arnoldsbiggin (Westby Hall). Although the manorof Gisburne was first acquired by the Lister's in 1614, the family only moved to this site, then called Lower Hall, in 1706. In the mid-18th century, the park was roamed by wild white cattle and deer, and the estate continues outside it, with an unusual tree nursery enclosure known as the ‘Great Nursery' situated on Coppy Hill to the west. The park is listed in Register of Historic Parks and Gardens and contains a number of notable buildings including the gate lodges at the principal entrance from the village which are listed Grade II*.

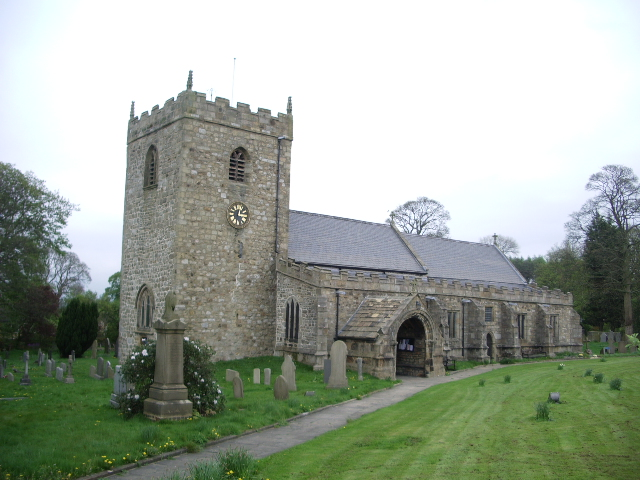
Church of St Mary the Virgin

=== The Church of St Mary the Virgin ===
In the graveyard lies buried one of England's greatest writers of hymn tunes, Francis Duckworth (1862–1941). His most famous tune is "Rimington", to which several hymns including Jesu Shall Reign Where'er the Sun may be sung. The opening lines of the tune are inscribed on his gravestone.

The church is a Grade II* listed building. The south porch has a wide outer entrance with moulded round arch and moulded imposts. The inner door, probably C13th, has a pointed arch with two orders of sunk quadrant moulding. The porch roof has two short king posts rising from collars.

In May 2015 it was announced that a rare King James Version of the Bible, printed in 1611, had been found at the church.

== Notable people ==
- Richard Wright (1877–1942), cricketer and educator, was born in Gisburn

== See also ==
- Listed buildings in Gisburn
