= A65 road =

Road in England

Coordinates: 53.99276°N 2.16482°W

A65

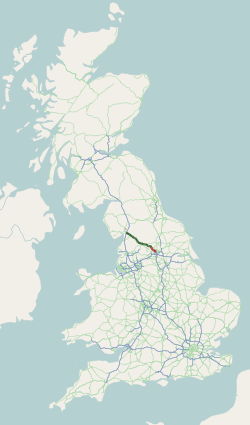

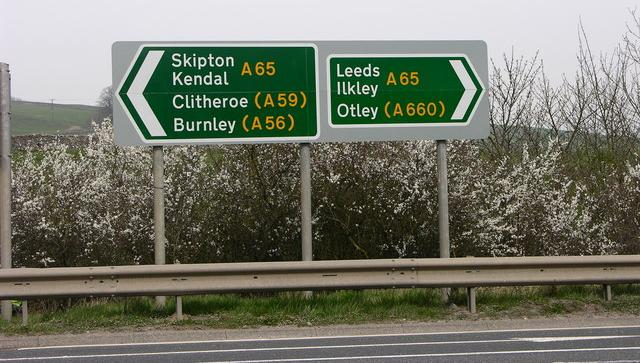

Route information
- Length: 69.0 mi (111.0 km)

Major junctions
- Southeast end: A58(M) / A58 in Leeds
- A59 in Skipton
- Northwest end: A6 in Kendal

Location
- Country: United Kingdom
- Counties: West Yorkshire; North Yorkshire; Lancashire; Cumbria
- Primary destinations: Skipton; Kirkby Lonsdale

Road network
- Roads in the United Kingdom; Motorways; A and B road zones
← A64	→ A66

The A65 is a major road in England. It runs north west from Leeds in West Yorkshire via Kirkstall, Horsforth, Yeadon, Guiseley, Ilkley and Skipton, west of Settle, Ingleton and Kirkby Lonsdale before terminating at Kendal in Cumbria.

== Bypasses ==
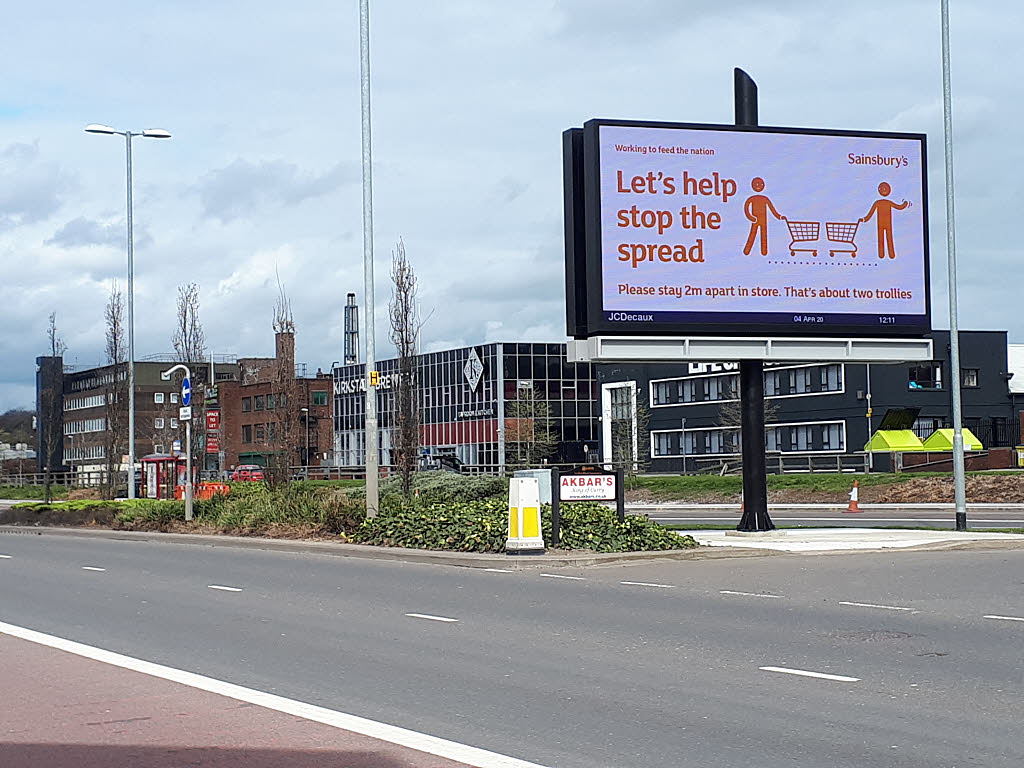
The Kirkstall Road dual carriageway near the end of the A65 in Leeds

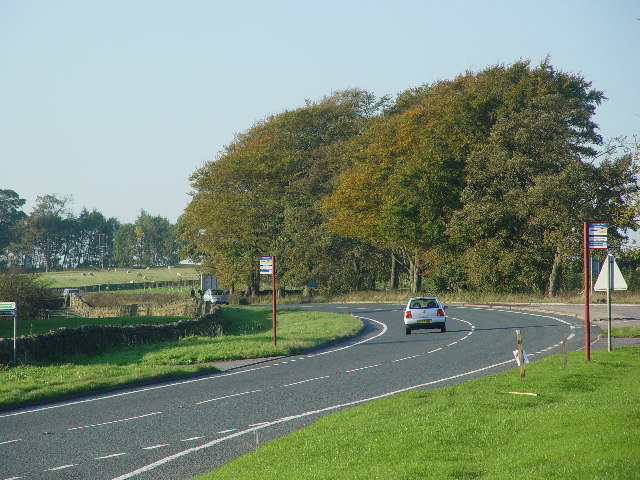
The A65 just north of Addingham, near Skipton

Listed from south to north, beginning at Leeds:

- The 2-mile (3.2 km) £5.5 million dual-carriageway Burley in Wharfedale Bypass opened in April 1995.
- The 2-mile (3.2 km) £4 million Addingham bypass opened in January 1991.
- The £2.8 million Draughton Bypass opened in December 1991.
- The north section of the £16.4 million Skipton Bypass opened in December 1981, which is part of the A59.
- North of Skipton, where the road meets the busy A629 from Bradford, there have been plans for a bypass around Gargrave, which is where the road crosses the Pennine Way.
- The 4-mile (6.4 km) £8.5 million Settle & Giggleswick Bypass opened in December 1988.
- The 1-mile (1.6 km) Clapham bypass is the earliest of these bypasses. The National Archives have a file "West Riding CC: Clapham Bypass (A65); consideration of proposals" covering 1948–1969.

== Road safety ==
The A65 between Long Preston and junction 36 of the M6 motorway has a poor safety record, according to EuroRAP being listed as a medium-high risk road. This 26-mile (42 km) stretch of single carriageway road suffered 48 fatal or serious injury accidents between 2002 and 2004. The road features in the list of highest risk roads in Britain (excluding motorcycle accidents). The section between Leeds and Long Preston is listed as being a low-medium risk road.

== Junction list ==
County	Location	mi	km	Destinations	Notes
West Yorkshire	Leeds	0.0	0.0	A58(M) east / A58 west to Wellington Street / M621 / M1 / M62 / A64(M) / A64 / A62 / A647 – City centre, Wetherby, York, Harrogate, Halifax, Huddersfield, Bradford	Southeastern terminus; western terminus of A58(M)
West Yorkshire	Horsforth	4.6	7.4	A6120 (Ring Road) to M62 / M1 / A647 / A61 / A58 / A64 – Bradford, Harrogate, Wetherby, York, Pudsey, Shipley	To A61, Harrogate and Shipley signed northwest only, To A58, A64, Wetherby and York southeast only
West Yorkshire	Rawdon– Yeadon boundary	7.0	11.3	A658 (Apperley Lane / Green Lane) to A61 – Bradford, Greengates, Harrogate, Pool	
West Yorkshire	Guiseley	9.1	14.6	A6038 south (Bradford Road) to A650 – Bradford, Shipley, Baildon	Southeastern terminus of A6038 concurrency
West Yorkshire	Menston	10.2	16.4	A6038 north (Otley Road) to A61 – Otley, Harrogate	To A61 and Harrogate signed northwest only; northwestern terminus of A6038 concurrency
West Yorkshire	Burley in Wharfedale	11.7	18.8	A660 southeast to A658 – Leeds, Harrogate, Otley	Otley signed southeast only; northwestern terminus of A660
West Yorkshire	Addingham	19.4	31.2	A6034 south / B6160 (Silsden Road) to A629 – Keighley, Addingham, Silsden	Northern terminus of A6034
North Yorkshire	Skipton	23.5	37.8	Otley Road (A6069 west) – Skipton	Eastern terminus of A6069
North Yorkshire	Skipton	23.8	38.3	A59 east – Harrogate	Southeastern terminus of A59 concurrency
North Yorkshire	Skipton	24.4	39.3	The Bailey (A6131 south) – Skipton, Embsay	Northern terminus of A6131
North Yorkshire	Stirton with Thorlby	26.5	42.6	A59 west / A629 south (Rotary Way) to A56 / A650 – Clitheroe, Burnley, Keighley, Bradford, Earby	Routes, Clitheroe, Burnley, Keighley and Bradford signed northwest only, Earby southeast only; northwestern terminus of A59 concurrency; northern terminus of A629
North Yorkshire	Long Preston	36.4	58.6	A682 south to A59 – Nelson, Gisburn, Nappa	Northern terminus of A682
North Yorkshire	Thornton in Lonsdale	51.2	82.4	A687 west to A683 / M6 south – Burton in Lonsdale, Lancaster	Eastern terminus of A687
Lancashire– Cumbria boundary	Burrow-with-Burrow– Casterton boundary	56.1	90.3	A683 south (Burrow Road) to M6 south – Lancaster, Caton, Hornby	Eastern terminus of A683 concurrency
Cumbria	Casterton	56.3	90.6	A683 north – Sedbergh, Casterton, Barbon	Western terminus of A683 concurrency
Cumbria	Preston Patrick	62.3	100.3	A590 southwest / A6070 south to M6 / A591 – Kendal, Barrow, Holme, Burton	A590 signed northwest only, To A591 southeast only; northeastern terminus of A590; northern terminus of A6070
Cumbria	Kendal	68.7	110.6	Romney Road / Natland Road to A6 / M6 / A590 / A591 – Lancaster, Barrow, Windermere, Natland	To A591 and Windermere signed northwest only
Cumbria	Kendal	69.0	111.0	A6 (Kirkland) to M6 / A591 / A590 – Lancaster, Windermere, Skipton, Barrow	Northwestern terminus
1.000 mi = 1.609 km; 1.000 km = 0.621 mi: Concurrency terminus
