= Ribble Way =

72-mile footpath in northern England

Coordinates: 53°44′12″N 2°49′01″W

The Ribble way is a long-distance walk between the Lancashire coast and the Yorkshire Dales National Park largely following the course of the River Ribble.

The route begins in Longton and ends at the source of the Ribble at Gayle Moor near Ribblehead, it is around 116 kilometres (72 mi) in length.

The route passes through a variety of landscapes including tidal marsh, open moorland and limestone gorges. It begins to the south of the Ribble estuary, the route then runs through Preston and on to the historic town of Clitheroe. Next it heads up into the Pennines to reach its source on remote Cam Fell.

== History ==
The idea of opening a walk along the Ribble called the Ribble Way was first suggested back in 1967 at the inaugural meeting of the Preston and Fylde branch of the Ramblers' Association. The Guardian reported in 1972 that the Ramblers Association were planning Britain's first riverside long footpath called the Ribble Way. At that time, the route being discussed was 103 kilometres (64 mi) from the estuary of the River Ribble at Walmer Bridge close to Preston to its source near the farmhouse of Far Gearstones in the West Riding of Yorkshire fells; just 45 kilometres (28 mi) of the planned route was designated right-of-way. The idea eventually attracted official support and was opened in 1985. The Ribble Valley is an area of 632 square kilometres (244 sq mi) of natural beauty from the north-west coast to the Lake District. The official course of the Ribble Way that is marked on the Ordnance Survey (2010) OS Openspace maps starts at Longton, the mouth of the river just west of Preston, 5 metres (16 ft) above mean sea level and finishes at Grove Head, just north of Cam Fell, 558 metres (1,831 ft) above mean sea level. Grove Head is actually the source of the Gayle Beck, which feeds into the River Ribble near Ribblehead. (Ribblehead is the area of moorland at the head of the River Ribble in the area known as Ribblesdale.)

== Route ==
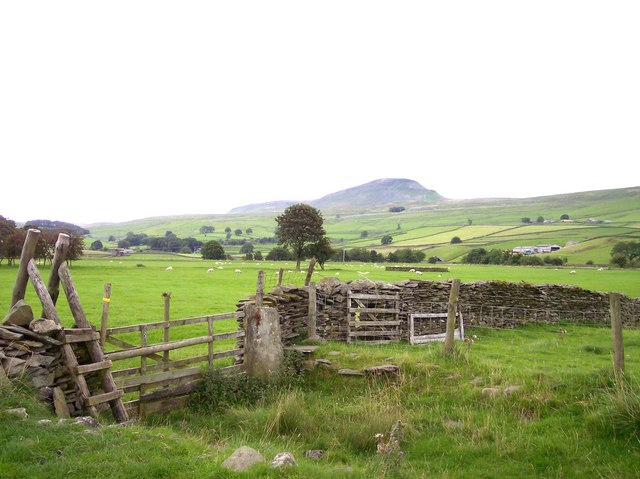
Stile on the Ribble Way

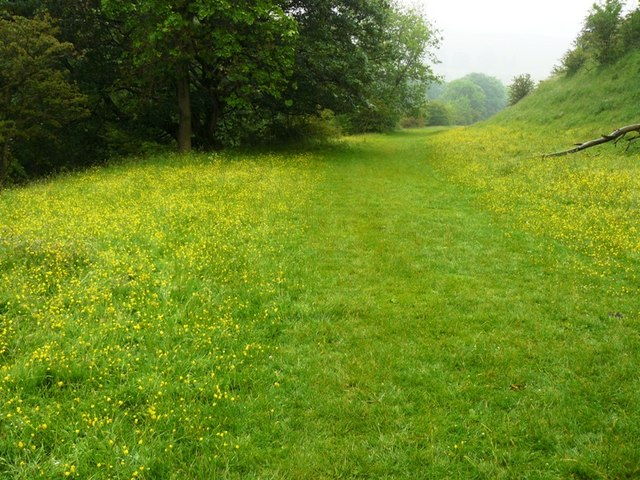
Ribble Way near Stainforth

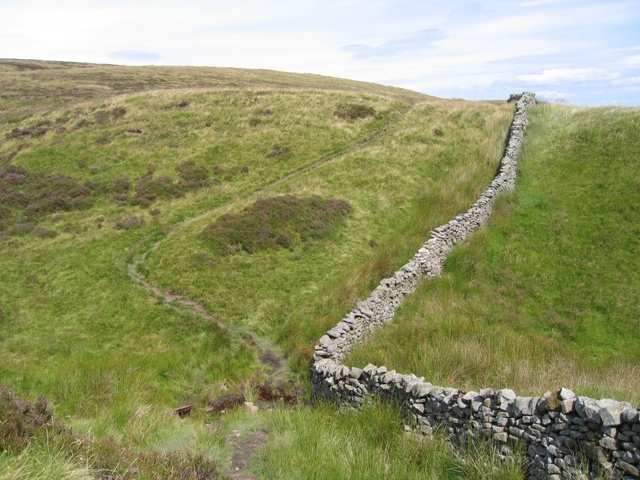
Ribble Way at Sikesdale Gill

The official start of the Ribble Way is the Dolphin Inn on Marsh Lane in Longton.

The Ribble Way connects with several other long-distance walks, including the Dales Way, the Pennine Way, the Pennine Bridleway and the Round Preston Walk.

=== Settlements ===
- Longton
- Preston
- Frenchwood
- Ribchester
- Little Town
- Winckley Hall
- Clitheroe
- Horrocksford
- Paythorne
- Rathmell
- Giggleswick
- Stainforth
- Horton in Ribblesdale
- Chapel-le-Dale

After which the route joins the Dales Way
