= Nappa, North Yorkshire =

Hamlet in North Yorkshire, England

Coordinates: 53.977000°N 2.221012°W

Nappa
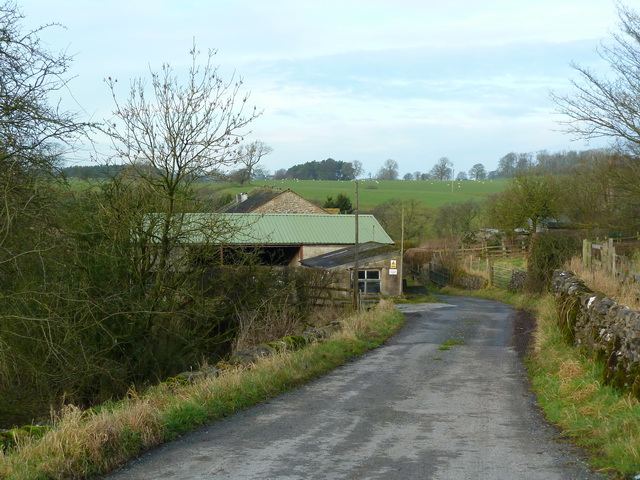
- Road to Manor Farm

- Location within North Yorkshire
- Population: 10
- OS grid reference: SD855534
- Civil parish: Hellifield
- Unitary authority: North Yorkshire
- Ceremonial county: North Yorkshire
- Region: Yorkshire and the Humber
- Country: England
- Sovereign state: United Kingdom
- Post town: SKIPTON
- Postcode district: BD23
- Police: North Yorkshire
- Fire: North Yorkshire
- Ambulance: Yorkshire
- UK Parliament: Skipton and Ripon

Nappa is a hamlet in the civil parish of Hellifield, in North Yorkshire, England. It is on the A682 road and 6 miles (9.7 km) north-west of Barnoldswick and 10.5 miles (17 km) west of Skipton. The population was estimated at 10 in 2010.

The place name Nappa, first mentioned in the Domesday Book as Napars, is of uncertain origin, but possibly derives from the Old English hnæpp ġehæġ, meaning "enclosure in a bowl-shaped hollow".

Nappa was historically a township in the ancient parish of Gisburn in the West Riding of Yorkshire. It became a separate civil parish in 1866. It was transferred to the new county of North Yorkshire in 1974. The civil parish was abolished on 1 April 2014 and amalgamated with the parish of Hellifield. From 1974 to 2023 it was part of the Craven District, it is now administered by the unitary North Yorkshire Council.

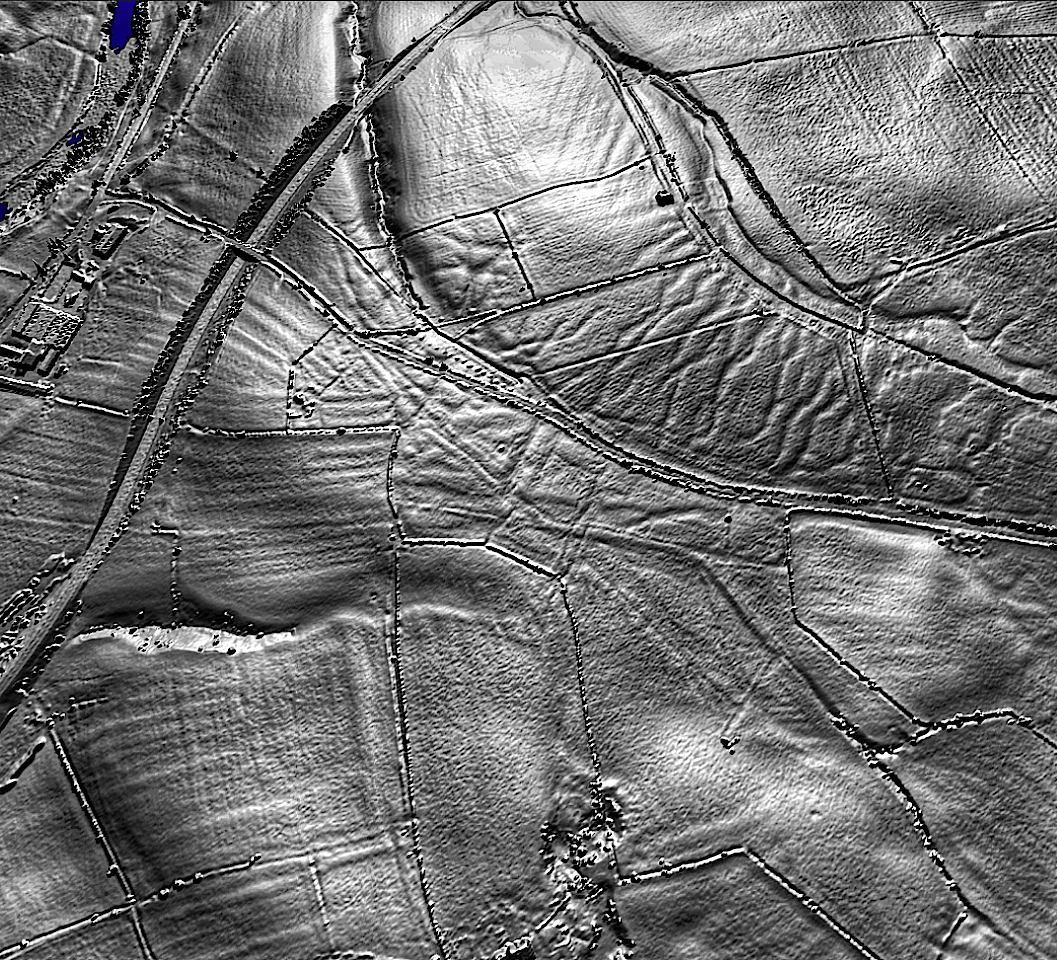
A lidar view of the possible site of Medieval Nappa (MNY40778)

== See also ==
- Listed buildings in Hellifield
