= Hellifield =

Village and civil parish in North Yorkshire, England

Coordinates: 54°00′21″N 2°13′18″W

- Village and parish
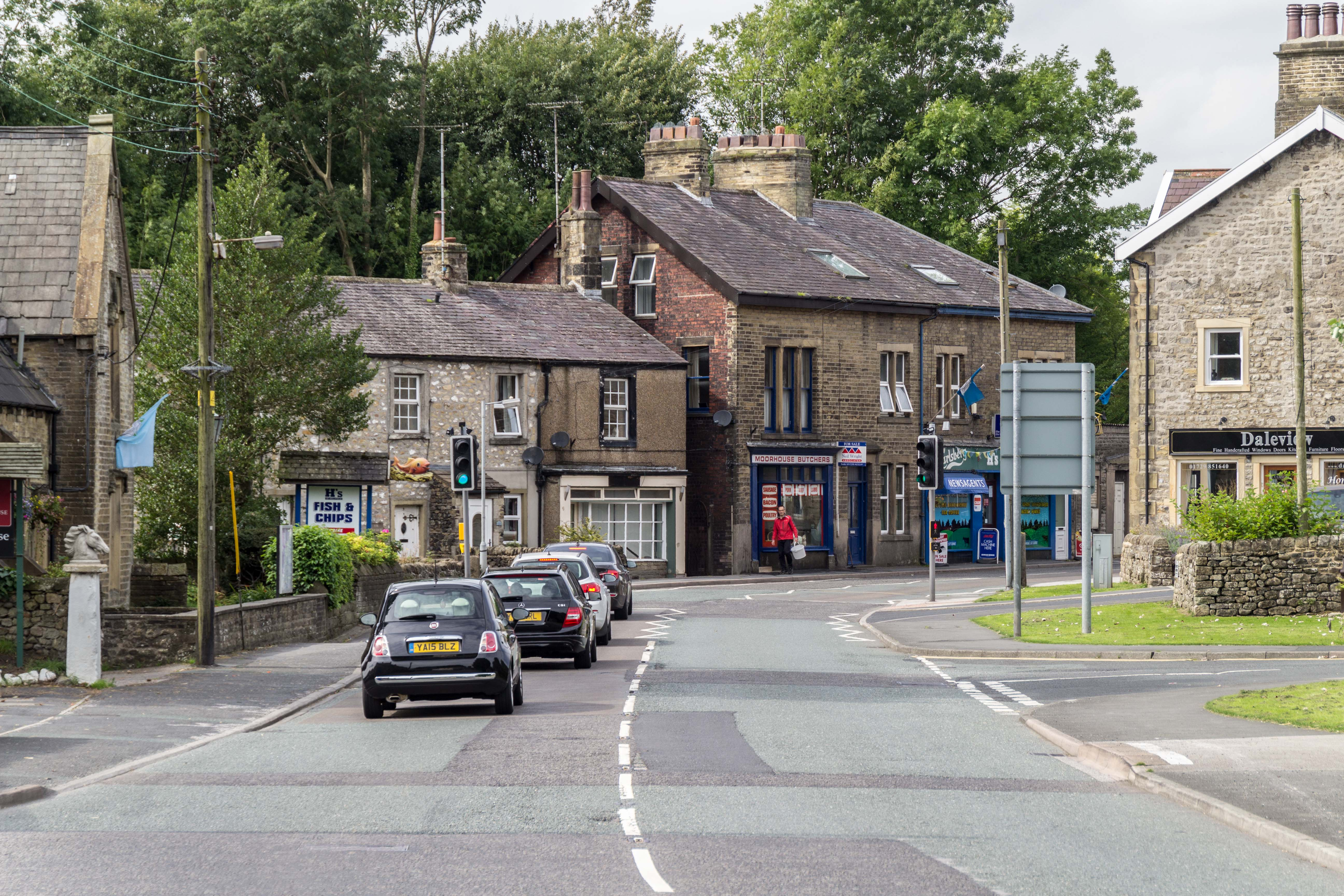

- Location within North Yorkshire
- Population: 1,426 (2011 census)
- OS grid reference: SD855565
- Civil parish: Hellifield
- Unitary authority: North Yorkshire
- Ceremonial county: North Yorkshire
- Region: Yorkshire and the Humber
- Country: England
- Sovereign state: United Kingdom
- Post town: SKIPTON
- Postcode district: BD23
- Dialling code: 01729
- Police: North Yorkshire
- Fire: North Yorkshire
- Ambulance: Yorkshire
- UK Parliament: Skipton and Ripon

Hellifield is a village and civil parish in North Yorkshire, England (grid reference SD855565). Historically part of the West Riding of Yorkshire. The village is an important railway junction on the Settle-Carlisle Railway between the Midland Railway and the Lancashire and Yorkshire Railway. It served by Hellifield railway station.

The village, which had a population of 1,060 residents at the 2001 census, increasing to 1,426 at the 2011 census is situated on the A65, between Skipton and Settle.

== History ==
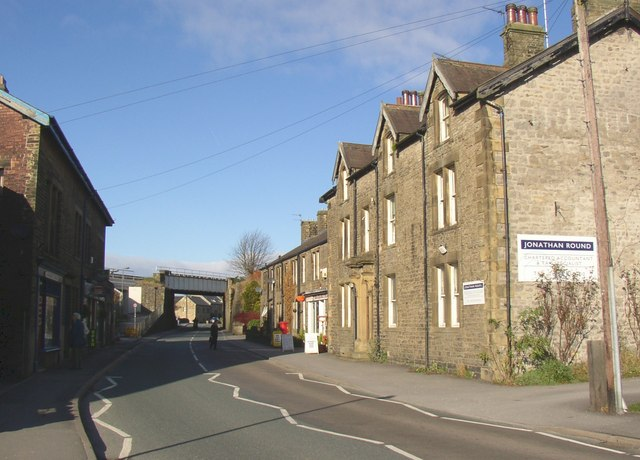
A rare quiet spell on the A65 road through Hellifield

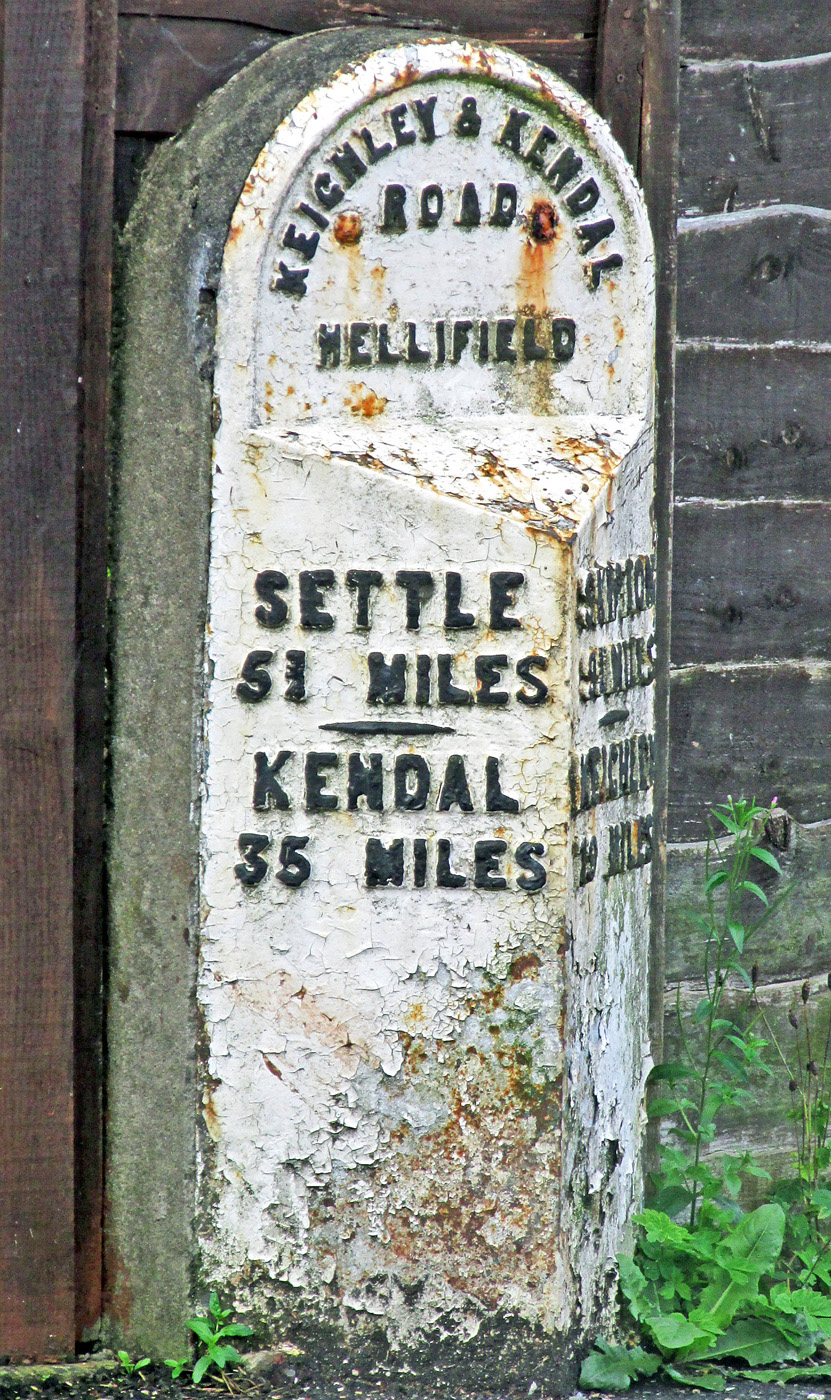
Old milestone near the village centre

In the Domesday Book of 1086, Hellifield is mentioned as Helgeflet; meaning 'Holy Marsh or Stream', translated from Anglo-Saxon, the village also could have been dedicated to the Anglo-Saxon Goddess 'Hel'. There is also the possibility that the name derives from the Norse 'The Farm of Helgi'. The village name changed over the years; in the 12th century, Hellifield was referred to as "Nether Hellifield" and in the 17th and 18th centuries the village was named "Hellifield Pele" and slightly later "Hellifield Cochins". The modern spelling of Hellifield appears in the mid-19th century, on maps and drawings.

In medieval times it seems that the area between Hellifield and Long Preston was hunted by wolves, so men were employed to guide travellers between the two settlements. Livestock suffered until the extinction in Britain of the grey wolf.

Hellifield was historically a township in the ancient parish of Long Preston in the West Riding of Yorkshire. It became a separate civil parish in 1866. From 1974 to 2023 it was part of the Craven District, it is now administered by the unitary North Yorkshire Council. In 2014 the small former civil parishes of Nappa and Swinden were added to the parish.

In the mid-19th century, the village was nothing more than a hamlet. The local workforce mainly concentrated within agriculture and associated trades.

Cotton weaving did take place in the village and several weaving sheds were constructed in the area. During the 19th century, the railway revolution reached the village, which dramatically changed the growth and population changes of the small hamlet. The original railway station was located on Haw Lane, but in 1880 a new station replaced the old one. This coincided with the opening of the Lancashire and Yorkshire Railway Company's new line from Blackburn to Hellifield. This line and the Midland Railway's Settle to Carlisle Railway (opened 1876), turned Hellifield into a major passenger and freight interchange. Consequently, many houses and streets were built in the early 20th century to house a large railway population.

The Methodist Church in Haw Grove was opened in 1893. Part of the church, known as the Wesley Centre, now serves as a community centre. St Aidan's Church, Hellifield, the Anglican church, opened in 1906.

Regular passenger services to Blackburn were cut in 1962, and the Motive Power Depot closed in 1963. New houses were constructed on top of previous railway land and the auction mart.

A proposal to build a 4-mile (6.5 km) bypass for the A65 around Hellifield and Long Preston has been in discussion since the end of the Second World War. The project was the subject of an inquiry in 1992–1993 and an archaeological survey. A decision to de-trunk the route in 2006 means that if the bypass were to go ahead, it would have to be funded by the county council.

== Geology ==
Hellifield mostly lies on mudstone that dates to the Carboniferous period; there are some patches of glaciofluvial deposits and peat around the village.

== Governance ==
Hellifield is a major part of the electoral ward called Hellifield and Long Preston. Its population at the 2011 census was 2,168. From 1974 to 2023 it was in the Craven local government district, and is now in North Yorkshire unitary authority area.

== Nature ==
The Hellifield Flashes (Yorkshire dialect for a pond in a field) are part of the village life and history. There are three flashes. The largest is Hellifield Flash or Gallaber Lake, the second Dunbars and the smallest is known as either Little Dunbars or Dunbars Two. The Flashes provide habitat for wildfowl and migratory birds providing habitats for 12 species on the RSPB "red list'.

== See also ==
- Listed buildings in Hellifield
