= Turton and Edgworth railway station =

Former railway station in England

Coordinates: 53.6366°N 2.4092°W

Turton and Edgworth
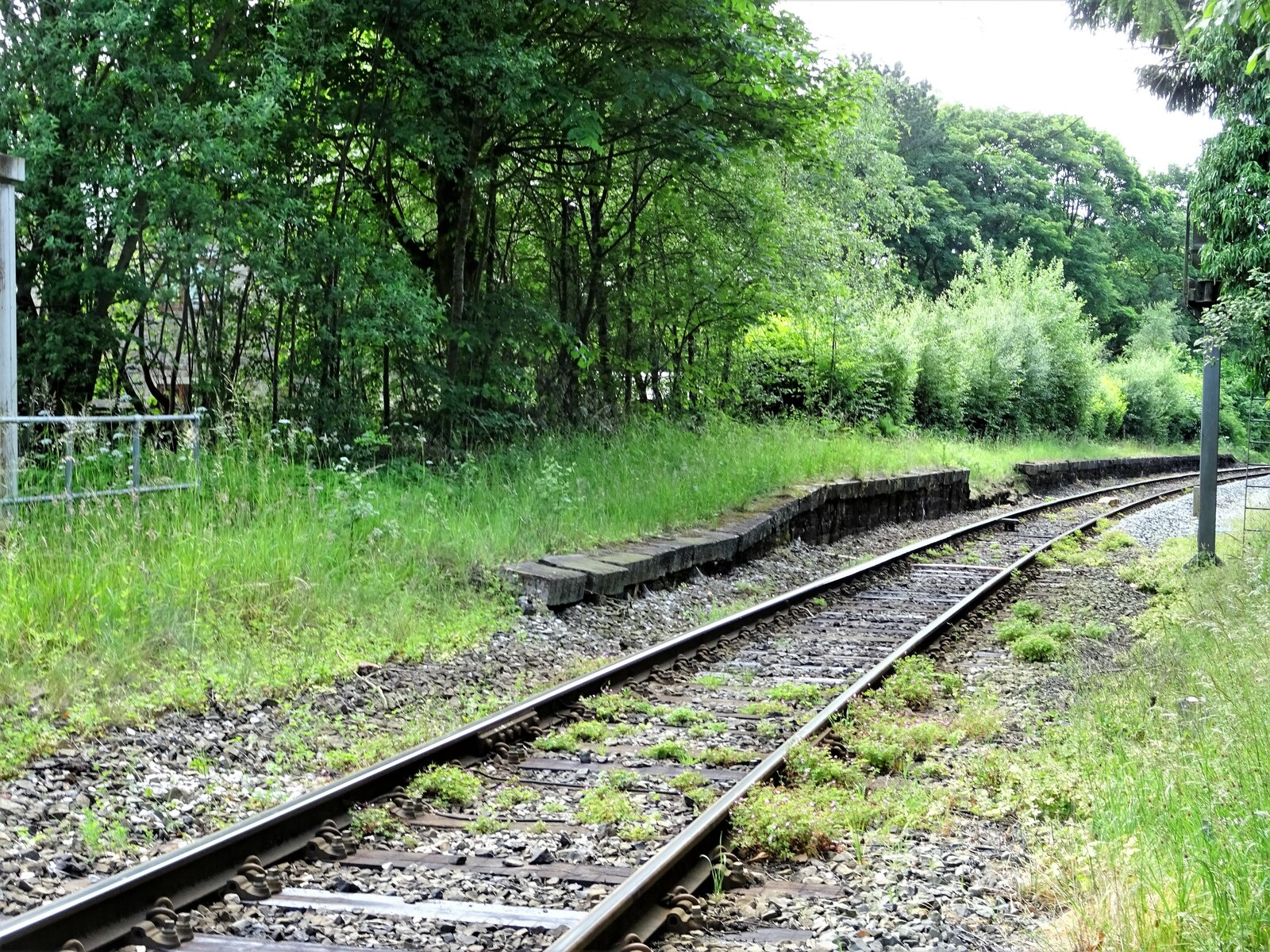
- The site of the station in 2021

General information
- Location: Chapeltown, Blackburn with Darwen; England
- Grid reference: SD730155
- Platforms: 2

Other information
- Status: Disused

History
- Original company: Bolton, Blackburn, Clitheroe & West Yorkshire Railway
- Pre-grouping: Lancashire and Yorkshire Railway; London and North Western Railway
- Post-grouping: London, Midland and Scottish Railway; London Midland Region of British Railways

Key dates
- 12 June 1848: Opened (Chapel Town)
- 1 July 1877: Renamed (Turton)
- 2 March 1891: Renamed (Turton and Edgworth)
- 6 February 1961: Closed to passengers
- 28 December 1964: Closed to freight
Location

Turton and Edgworth railway station, located at 4 miles, 856 yards from Bolton, on the Bolton to Blackburn line, opened as Chapel Town Station. The short length original low height platform seen in early photographs at the front of the station building are replicated exactly at Bromley Cross, itself known to have opened in June 1848. Permanent station buildings were provided along the line in 1859, constructed with locally quarried sandstone, by Joseph Greenup and Co of Manchester. The original minutes of the railway company held at National Archives, Kew, reveal that the engineers drew up the plans for the 1859 building at Chapel Town and minute 273, dated 25 May 1859, reveals that tenders were sought for a station and detached cottage and loading shed at Chapel Town, at an estimated cost of £500. The 'detached cottage' survives as a private house close to the automated level crossing and the distinct two-half structure there appears identical to that surviving at the former Oaks Station, down the line towards Bolton, both being built as part of the same contract.

The original name Chapel Town became Turton in 1877 and finally Turton & Edgworth in 1891.

Station improvement works were carried out at the station in 1886 and a report published in The Bolton Chronicle revealed that 'the improvements at Turton Station are now completed by Mr Riley of Fleetwood, one of the best railway contractors in Lancashire.' The report told of two new waiting rooms on the Blackburn side, whilst on the platform for Bolton 'the booking office and old waiting rooms have been remodelled, with additional accommodation for the company's officials and passengers.' The original stone building was expanded to provide a ladies' waiting room, a general waiting room, lamp room and porters' room, with the booking office also extended. The works began in February 1886. and also included the raising of platform heights and the installation of the footbridge. The station also exhibited a large outside wall platform clock, as confirmed by early 1900s photographs and still seen at 'sister' station Bromley Cross today. The station closed to passengers in February 1961, but continued to deal with coal traffic in the sidings to the rear of the building. This facility was withdrawn in December 1964, the connections to the yard being removed in February 1965. Full demolition of the 1859 sandstone station buildings took place in the years following and all that remains are a few scattered large stone blocks under an overgrown area.

Its neighbouring stations are still operational, Entwistle being an unstaffed platform halt, but Bromley Cross with its staffed booking office. There have been calls to reopen the station by the Ribble Valley Rail user group.

== Signal Box ==
The original box was a Yardley/Smith type 1 brick structure as survives today at nearby Bromley Cross. It had a 20 lever Smith and Yarley frame and opened in 1876, possibly under the original name of Chapeltown. In 1927 the box received a new LNWR type 5 top and a 20 lever L&Y rear-mounted frame. The box finally closed in August 1975 when the crossing became automated and with the box ceasing to be a block post in 1973.

== Former services ==
| Preceding station | Disused railways | Following station |
|---|---|---|
| Entwistle | L&YR; Ribble Valley Line | Bromley Cross |
