= Entwistle railway station =

Railway station in Lancashire, England

Entwistle
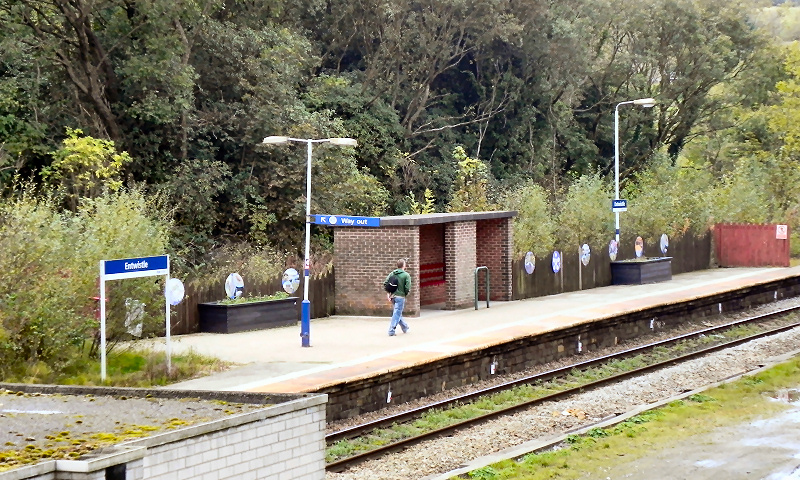

General information
- Location: Entwistle, Blackburn with Darwen; England
- Coordinates: 53.656°N 2.415°W
- Grid reference: SD727177
- Manager: Northern Trains
- Platforms: 1

Other information
- Station code: ENT
- Classification: DfT category F2

History
- Original company: Bolton, Blackburn, Clitheroe and West Yorkshire Railway
- Pre-grouping: Lancashire and Yorkshire Railway
- Post-grouping: London Midland and Scottish Railway

Key dates
- 1 August 1848: Opened

Passengers
- 2021/22: ▲19,296
- 2022/23: ▲20,426
- 2023/24: ▼18,112
- 2024/25: ▲19,988
- 2025/26: ▲21,916
Location
Notes
- Passenger statistics from the Office of Rail and Road

Entwistle railway station serves the village of Entwistle, Lancashire, as well as being the closest station to Edgworth. It is served by Northern Trains services on the Ribble Valley line, on which it is between Darwen and Bromley Cross. It is sited 16 miles 47 chains (26.7 km) from Manchester Victoria.

== History ==
A station was opened at Whittlestone Head, north of Entwistle, on 12 June 1848 by the Bolton, Blackburn, Clitheroe and West Yorkshire Railway. It was a very short-lived station, only being open for one and a half months before closing on 1 August 1848 and being relocated to Entwistle.

A more substantial stone building was built at Entwistle in 1859, as part of a larger contract, with similar stations being erected along the branch at The Oaks, Bromley Cross and Turton, by Manchester firm Joseph Greenup and Co. The 1859 contract was for both a station building and staff 'cottage' as erected at other stations along the branch. The 1891 OS map survey revealed that only two immediately nearby cottages existed - The Strawbury Duck Inn (then called Bridge House) and also a divided cottage alongside, Bridge Cottages.

The station underwent major expansion and refurbishment in 1902, when the line was rebuilt including new platform arrangements, a new signal box and an extensive goods yard built. Following the Beeching cuts in the 1960s, the station was reduced to its status as an unstaffed country halt, and in the 1970s the line was singled.

=== Signal box ===
Typically for this branch line, a Yardley/Smith type 1 brick signal box opened here in 1876, situated on the Down side north of the station, containing an 18 lever Smith frame. This box was replaced in 1902 or 1904 by a new 60 lever, gantry-mounted size 12 L&YR box, in connection with the quadrupling of the line through to Waltons Siding 1453 yds to the north. Numerous highly detailed large scale original drawings survive for these track and related works from the early 1900s.

== Facilities ==
The station has a ticket machine, a shelter and cycle spaces. As there are no facilities to purchase tickets, passengers must buy one in advance, or from the guard on the train.

== Passenger volume ==
Passenger volume at Entwistle
| | 2004–05 | 2005–06 | 2006–07 | 2007–08 | 2008–09 | 2009–10 | 2010–11 | 2011–12 | 2012–13 | 2013–14 | 2014–15 | 2015–16 | 2016–17 | 2017–18 | 2018–19 | 2019–20 | 2020–21 | 2021–22 | 2022–23 | 2023–24 | 2024–25 |
|---|---|---|---|---|---|---|---|---|---|---|---|---|---|---|---|---|---|---|---|---|---|
| Entries and exits | 9,158 | 10,025 | 9,089 | 8,756 | 9,442 | 7,718 | 11,542 | 15,458 | 15,498 | 14,762 | 15,036 | 10,596 | 16,662 | 12,852 | 10,890 | 15,778 | 5,748 | 19,296 | 20,426 | 18,112 | 19,988 |

The statistics cover twelve month periods that start in April.

== Services ==
Generally there is an hourly service northbound to Blackburn and Clitheroe and southbound to Manchester Victoria and Rochdale. Sunday trains terminate at Manchester Victoria.

Owing to the remote location and low passenger numbers, Entwistle was a request stop for several years. It is now a compulsory stop for all services.

| Preceding station | National Rail | Following station |
|---|---|---|
| Darwen | Northern Trains Ribble Valley line | Bromley Cross |
| | Historical railways | |
| Spring Vale | L&YR; Bolton, Blackburn, Clitheroe and West Yorkshire Railway | Turton and Edgworth |

== Bibliography ==
- Wills, Dixe (2014). Tiny Stations (Paperback, 1st reprint ed.). Basingstoke: AA Publishing. ISBN 978-0-7495-7732-2.
