= Rimington =

Village in Lancashire, England

Coordinates: 53.908°N 2.295°W

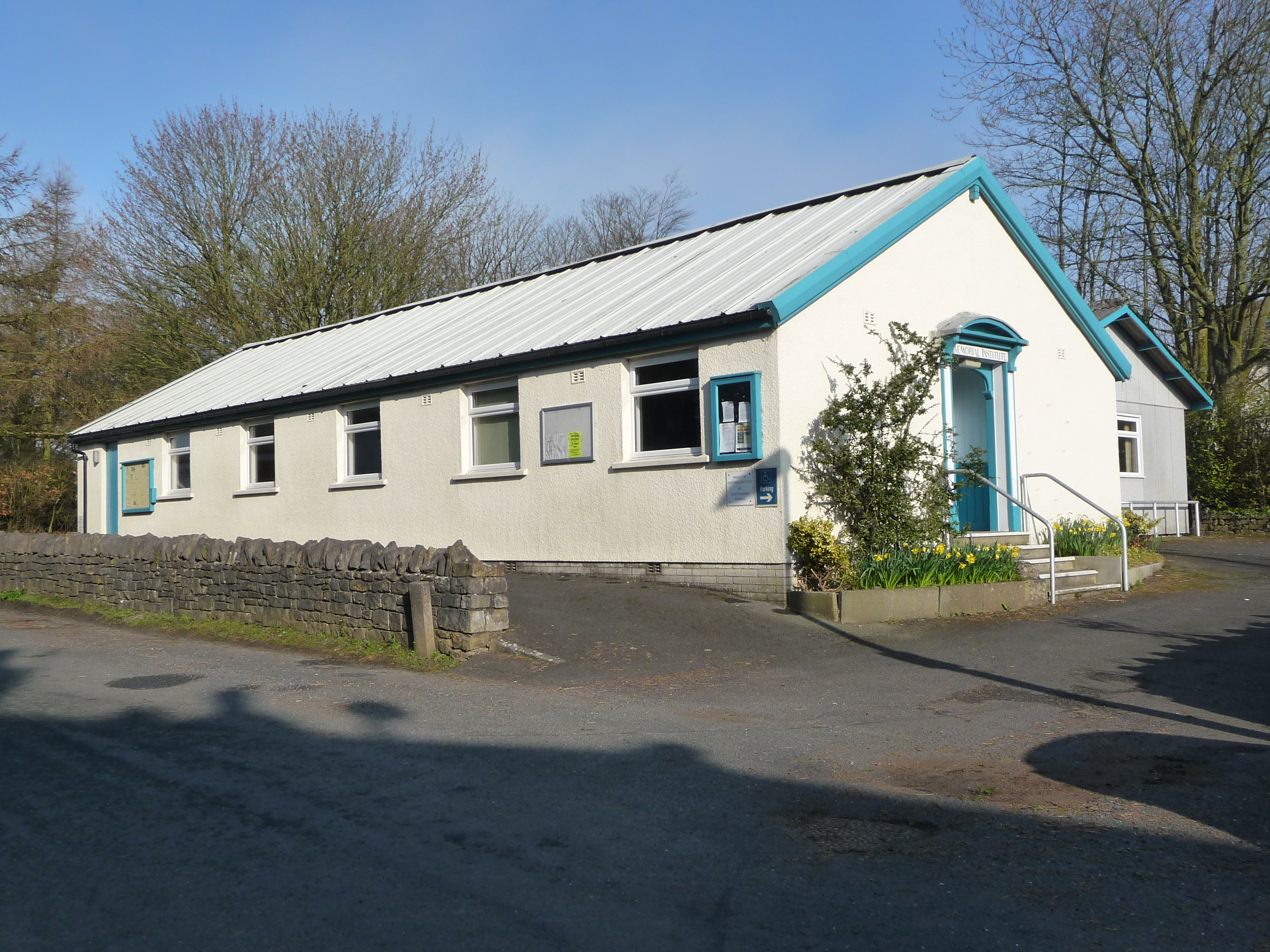
- The Memorial Institute, built 1927

- Shown within Ribble Valley Location within Lancashire
- Population: 382 (2001 census)
- OS grid reference: SD806458
- Civil parish: Rimington
- District: Ribble Valley
- Shire county: Lancashire
- Region: North West
- Country: England
- Sovereign state: United Kingdom
- Post town: CLITHEROE
- Postcode district: BB7
- Dialling code: 01200
- Police: Lancashire
- Fire: Lancashire
- Ambulance: North West
- UK Parliament: Ribble Valley

Rimington is a rural village and civil parish in the Ribble Valley, Lancashire, England. The population of the civil parish was 382 at the 2001 Census, however at the 2011 Census Middop was included with Rimington giving a total of 480. It is east of Clitheroe and south of the A59 road. The village consists of the hamlets of Howgill, Martin Top, Newby, and Stopper Lane, and is in the historic West Riding of Yorkshire.

The parish adjoins the Ribble Valley parishes of Gisburn, Sawley, Downham, Twiston and Middop the Pendle parish of Barley-with-Wheatley Booth.

== History ==
The village was listed in the Domesday Book as "Renistone". The name Boulton (Bolton) is listed in land deeds of 1302, and Robert Elwald son of Alan listed 1304.

Since Tudor times, until the late 19th century, lead mining was an important industry around the village. At one time silver was derived as a by-product of the mining, to the extent that Queen Elizabeth I declared the Stopper Lane Mine as being a Mine Royal.

Francis Duckworth (1862–1941) was born in the village, and composed several hymn tunes including one named after the village. There is a plaque to his memory was placed above the doorway to the former Methodist Chapel in Stopper Lane. Salem Chapel, the local Congregational Church at Martin Top, was founded in 1816 and continues to serve the area.

Rimington railway station opened in 1872 and closed in 1959, and was on the Ribble Valley Line.

Rimington Memorial Institute was built in 1927 to serve as the village's war memorial. The institute, which is run a Registered Charity, is run by a Committee comprising mainly, but not solely, representatives of the various groups who regularly use its facilities. It is a focus for a range of local activities including meetings of the parish council and of the Women's Institute. The building was renovated in 2016.

== Governance ==
Rimington was once a township in the ancient parish of Gisburn, in the Staincliffe Wapentake of the West Riding of Yorkshire. This became a civil parish in 1866, forming part of the Bowland Rural District from 1894 to 1974 within the West Riding County Council administrative boundaries. It has since become part of the borough of Ribble Valley, which is in the administrative county of Lancashire. The parish council is called Rimington and Middop, and is shared with Middop, a small rural parish east of Rimington with a population of 43 at the 2001 census, (2001 census)

Along with Middop, Gisburn, Gisburn Forest, Paythorne, Newsholme and Horton, the parish forms the Gisburn, Rimington ward of Ribble Valley Borough Council.

== Media gallery ==
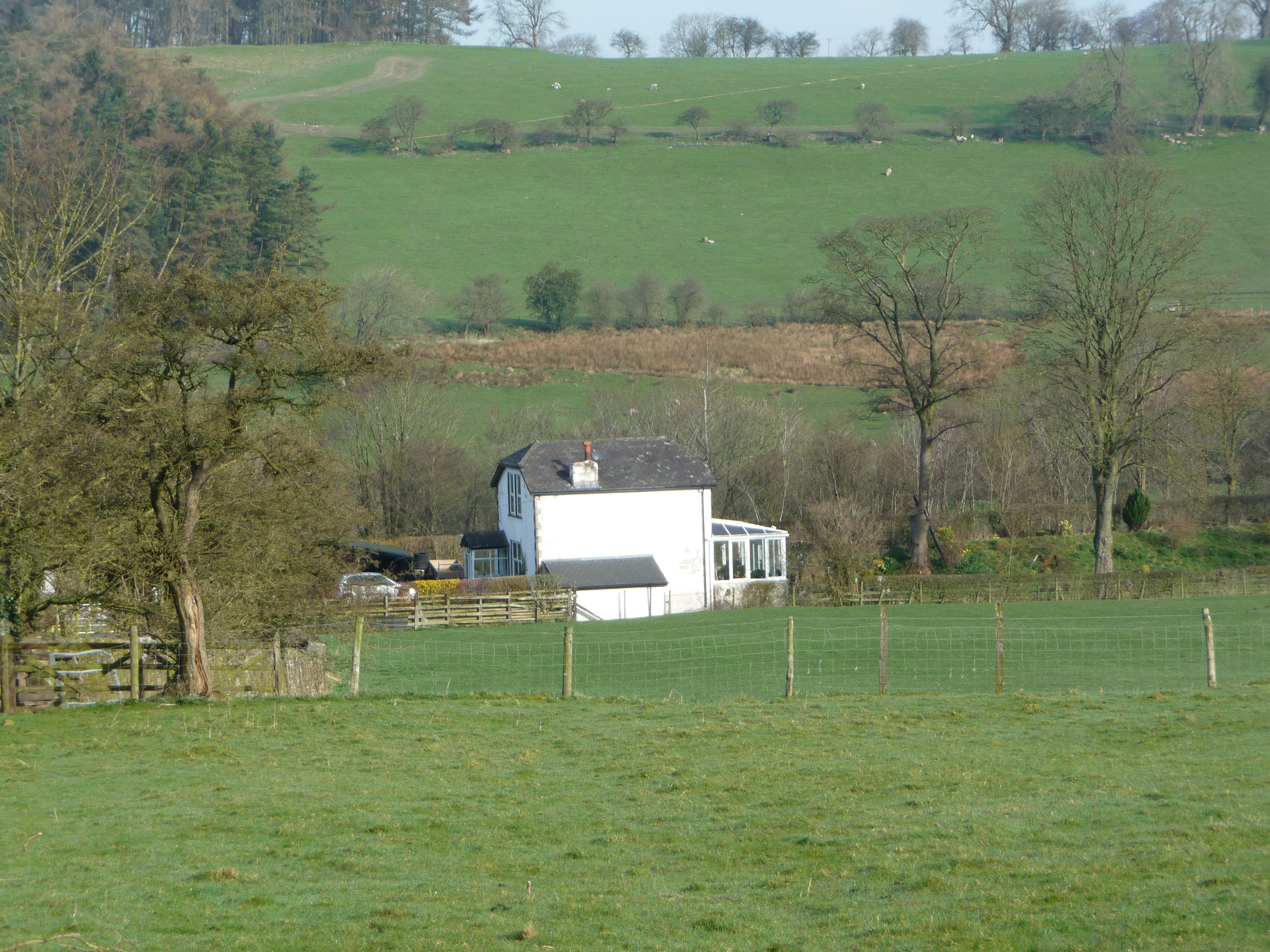
The site of the former Rimington railway station.

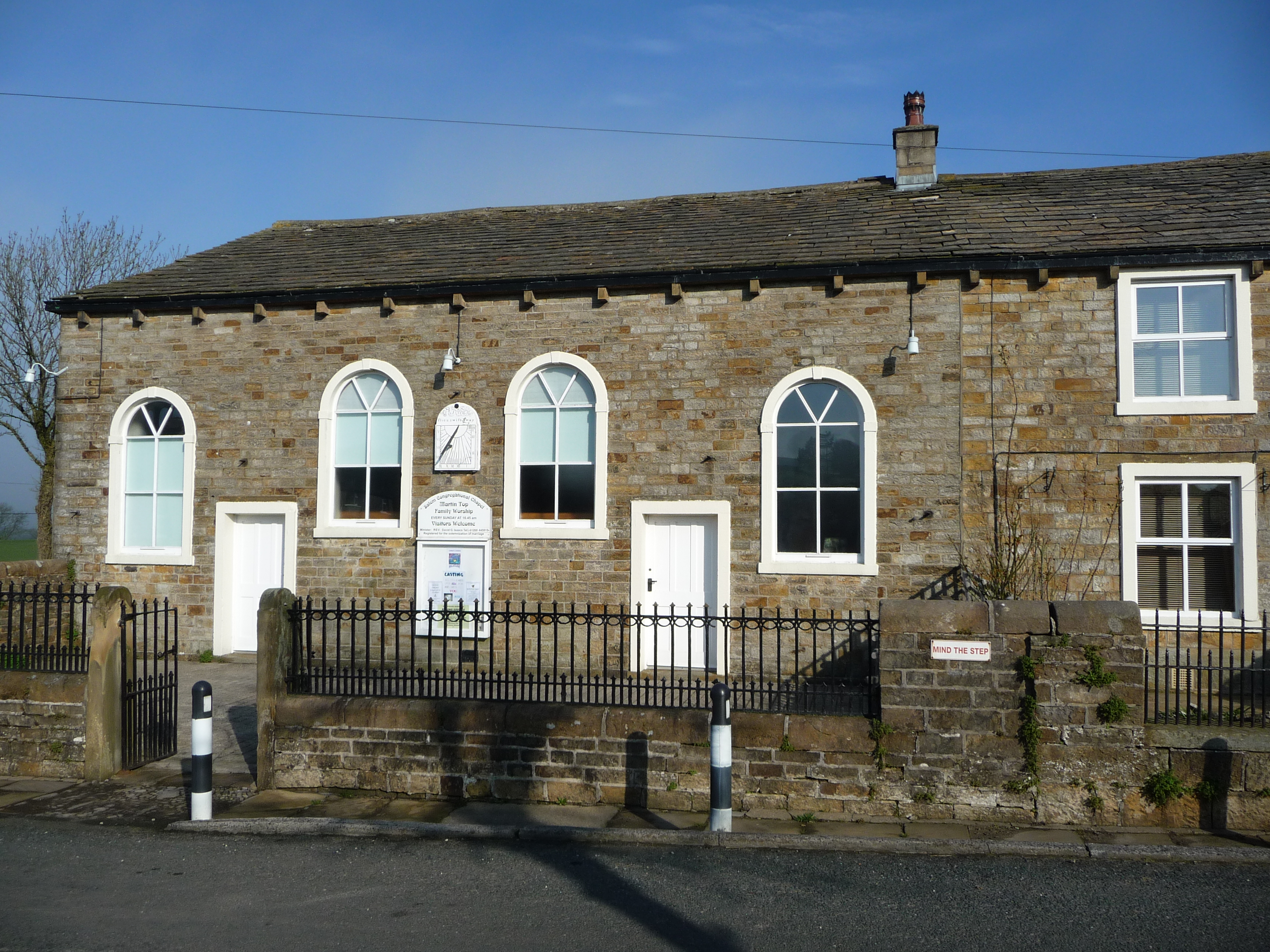
Salem Congregational Chapel on Long Lover Lane, founded 1816.

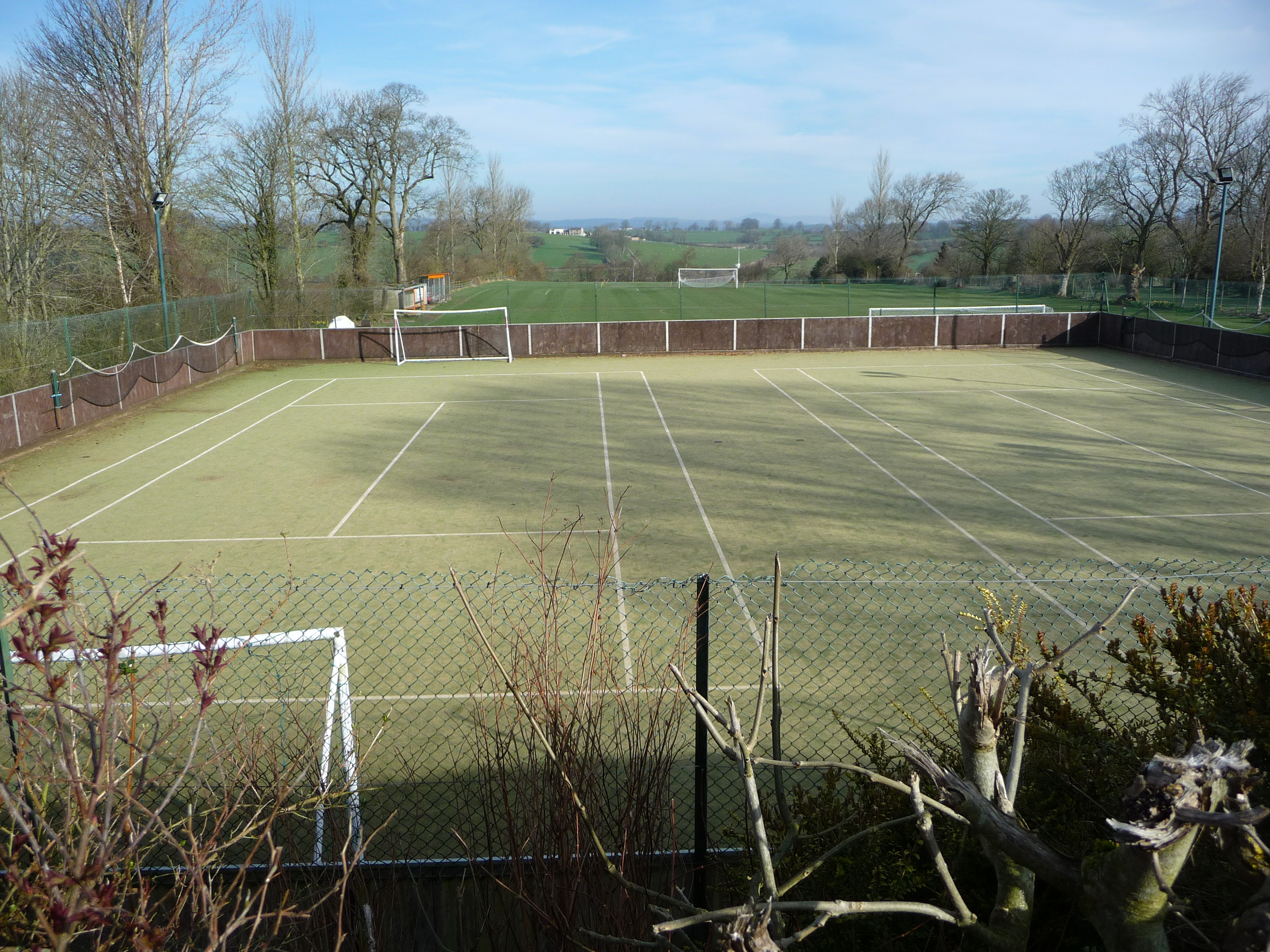
Sports facilities provided by Rimington Recreation Association.

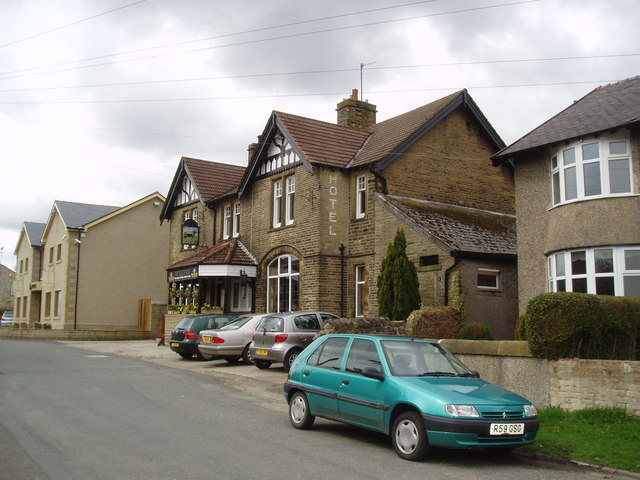
The Black Bull Hotel.

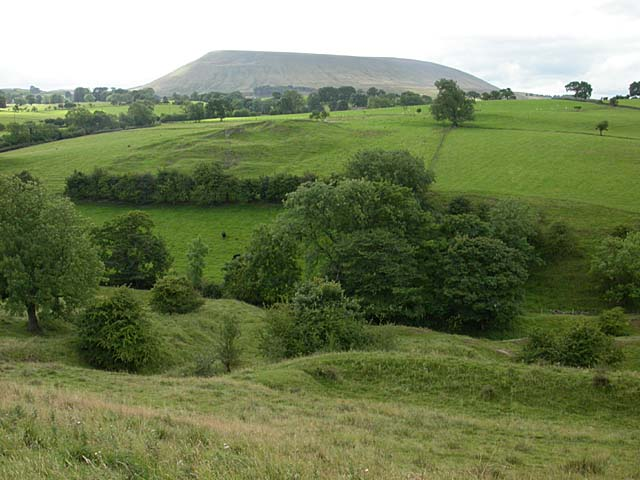
Part of the former Rimington mines with Pendle Hill in the background.

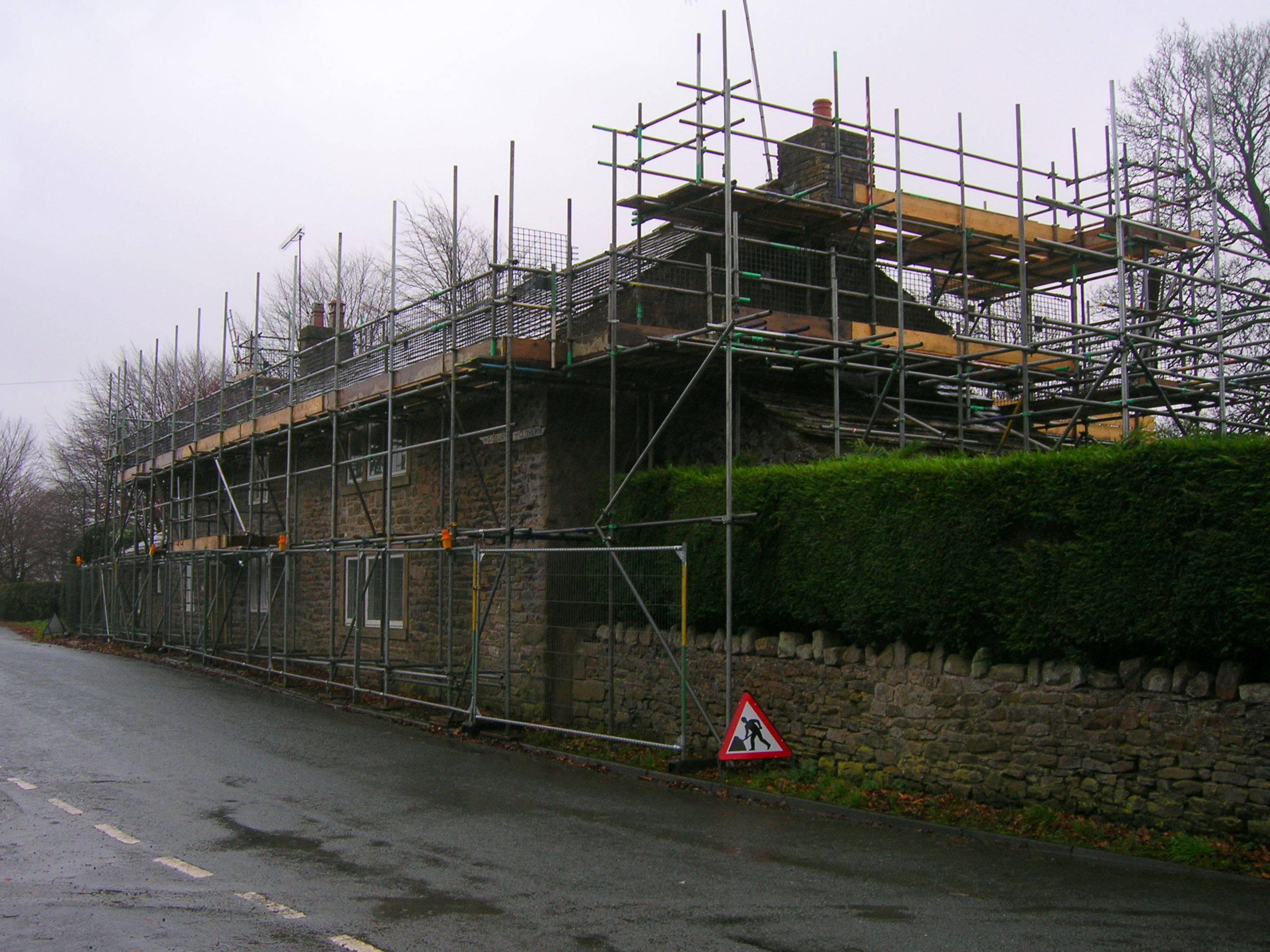
Bustards Farmhouse undergoing repairs.

== See also ==
- Listed buildings in Rimington
