= Hall i' th' Wood railway station =

Railway station in Greater Manchester, England

Coordinates: 53.5969°N 2.4132°W

Hall i' th' Wood
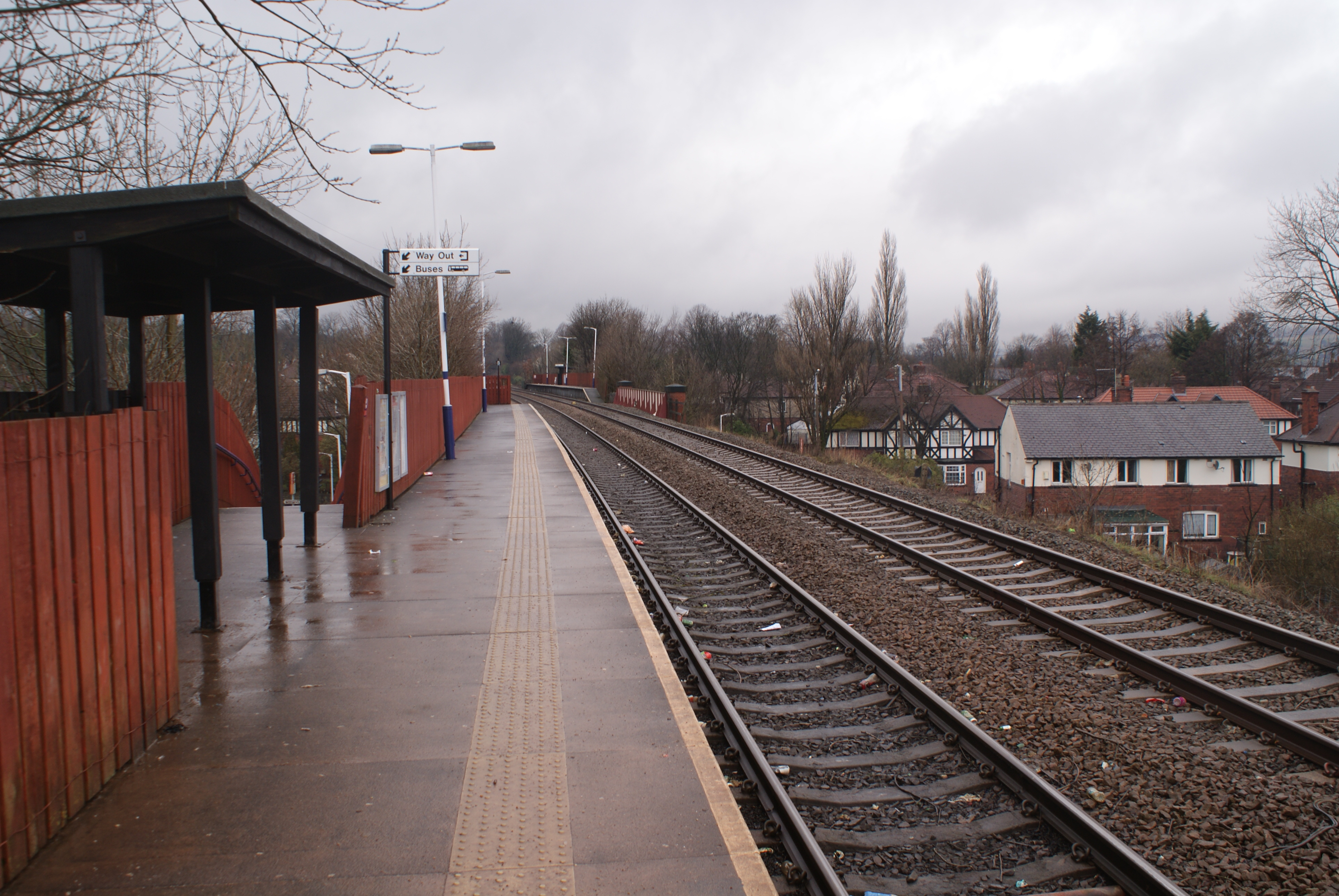
- Hall i' th' Wood station looking north

General information
- Location: Bolton, Bolton; England
- Grid reference: SD727112
- Manager: Northern Trains
- Transit authority: Transport for Greater Manchester
- Platforms: 2

Other information
- Station code: HID
- Classification: DfT category F2

History
- Opened: September 1986
- Original company: London Midland Region of British Railways

Key dates
- 29 September 1986: Station opened

Passengers
- 2021/22: ▲0.108 million
- 2022/23: ▲0.143 million
- 2023/24: ▲0.170 million
- 2024/25: ▲0.196 million
- 2025/26: ▲0.202 million
Location
Notes
- Passenger statistics from the Office of Rail and Road

Hall i' th' Wood railway station is the last stop before Bolton on the Northern Trains franchise's Ribble Valley line into Blackburn and Clitheroe in England.

The station was opened by British Rail on 29 September 1986. It is located in the middle of a housing estate and forms an unofficial footpath between the two sides. In March 2008 work began on a new car park for the station.

It takes its name from the nearby Hall i' th' Wood, now a museum which is within walking distance of the station.

== Facilities ==
The station is unstaffed and has basic amenities - waiting shelters and timetable posters on each platform, plus a telephone. The wooden platforms are staggered, with the southbound one the further north of the two. There is no step-free access to either platform (the ramps from the road that passes beneath the line both have steps).

== Services ==
The former franchise operator Arriva Rail North announced a much enhanced all day half-hourly service Weekdays and Saturdays in both directions from Dec 2017, rather than merely at morning and evening peak periods as before. The additional services however start/terminate at Blackburn, so the service through to Clitheroe remains hourly; southbound trains extend through to Rochdale. The Sunday service is hourly to Clitheroe and Manchester.

The timetable was affected by weekend engineering work south of Bolton (as part of the heavily delayed Manchester to Preston Line electrification project) for much of 2018.

Preceding station	National Rail	Following station
Bromley Cross	Northern Trains Ribble Valley line	Bolton
