= Entwistle, Lancashire =

Village in Lancashire, England

Coordinates: 53.654°N 2.413°W

Entwistle
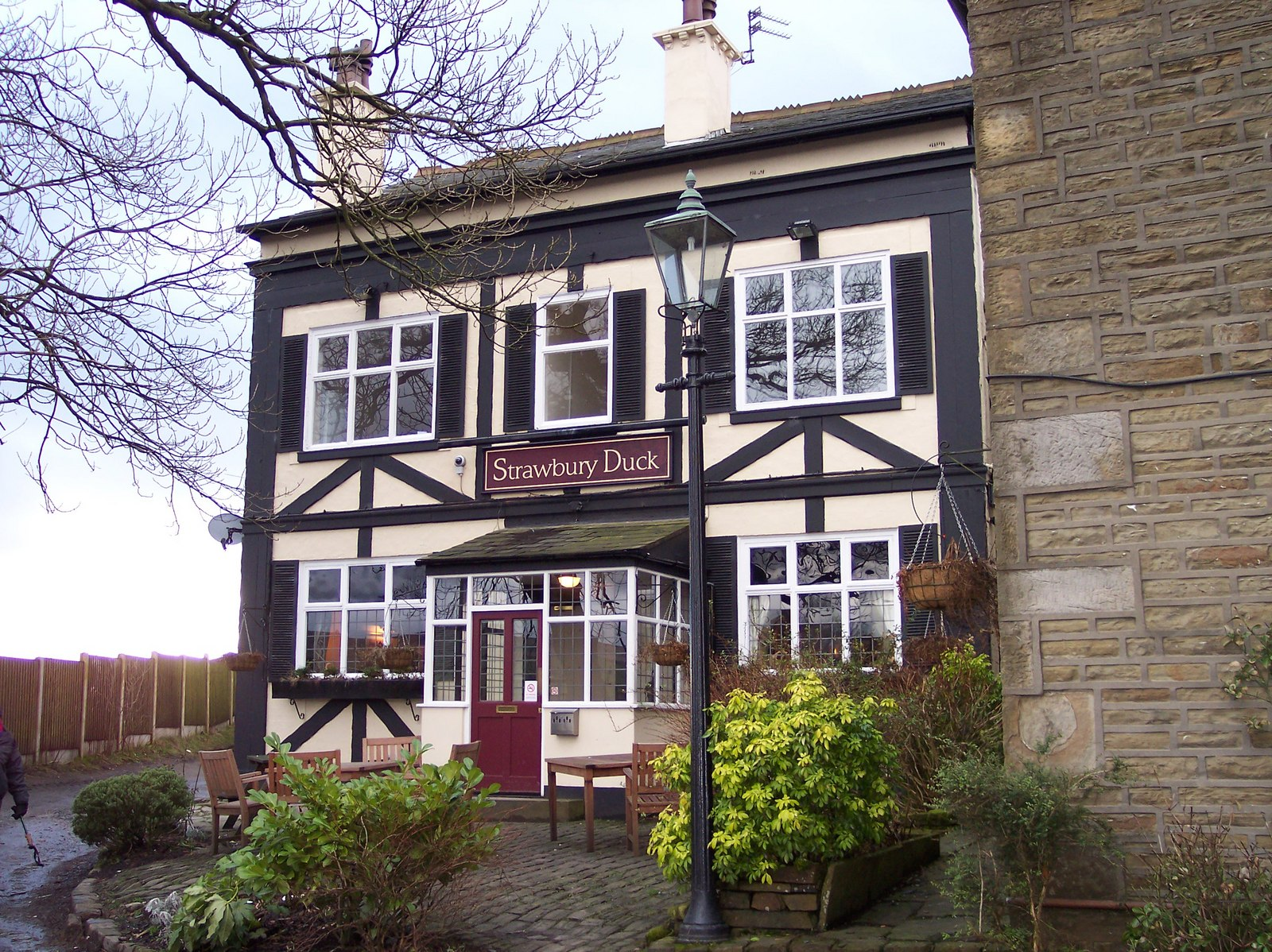
- The Strawbury Duck public house, Entwistle

- Shown within Blackburn with Darwen Location within Lancashire
- OS grid reference: SD727176
- Civil parish: North Turton
- Unitary authority: Blackburn with Darwen
- Ceremonial county: Lancashire
- Region: North West
- Country: England
- Sovereign state: United Kingdom
- Post town: BOLTON
- Postcode district: BL7
- Dialling code: 01204
- Police: Lancashire
- Fire: Lancashire
- Ambulance: North West
- UK Parliament: Rossendale and Darwen

Entwistle is a village in the civil parish of North Turton, in the Blackburn with Darwen unitary authority area in the ceremonial county of Lancashire, England.

Its name derives from the Old English ened and twisla which means a river fork frequented by ducks. The name was recorded as Hennetwisel in 1212, Ennetwysel in 1276 and Entwissell in 1311. Entwistle is situated in a fork between the Edgeworth Brook and a smaller tributary. Entwistle was originally a township in the chapelry of Turton which was part of the large ecclesiastical parish of Bolton le Moors in the hundred of Salford. In 1866 Entwistle became a separate civil parish, on 30 September 1898 the parish was abolished and merged with Edgworth. In 1891 the parish had a population of 287.

Entwistle Hall is a 16th-century farmhouse which dates from the time of the Entwistle family. It is a Grade II listed building. The south facing front of the Hall still has many Tudor features including mullioned windows with dripstone headings.

Entwistle railway station, situated between Darwen and Bromley Cross railway stations on the line between Blackburn and Bolton, was a request stop until the May 2023 timetable change. The station is situated close to the Strawbury Duck public house.

Nearby streams have been dammed to form the Wayoh and Turton and Entwistle Reservoirs. The area is popular with walkers, anglers and joggers.

Entwistle, which lies to the north-eastern corner of the old Turton Urban District (which also includes Edgworth, Quarlton, Bradshaw, Harwood, Turton, and Longworth), is about 1,000 feet above sea level and consists of some 1,668 acres.

== Notable people ==
- James Brandwood (1739–1826), Quaker minister
