= Darwen railway station =

Railway station in Lancashire, England

Darwen
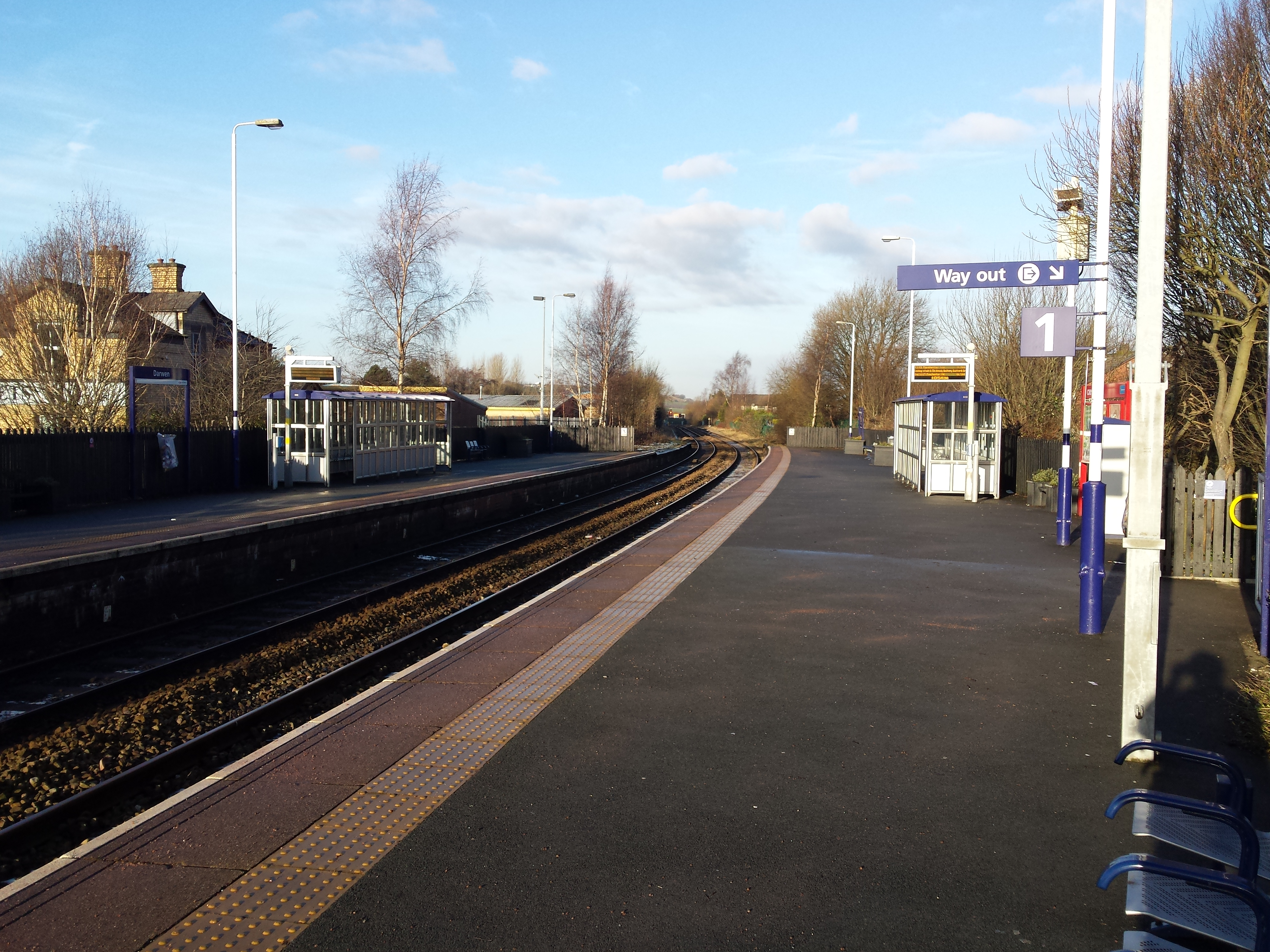
- Darwen railway station looking north in 2014

General information
- Location: Darwen, Blackburn with Darwen; England
- Coordinates: 53.698°N 2.465°W
- Grid reference: SD694225
- Manager: Northern Trains
- Platforms: 2

Other information
- Station code: DWN
- Classification: DfT category F1

History
- Opened: 1847
- Original company: Bolton, Blackburn, Clitheroe and West Yorkshire Railway
- Pre-grouping: Lancashire and Yorkshire Railway
- Post-grouping: London, Midland and Scottish Railway

Key dates
- 3 August 1847: Opened as Over Darwen
- 1 December 1883: Renamed Darwen

Passengers
- 2021/22: ▲0.235 million
- 2022/23: ▲0.269 million
- 2023/24: ▲0.302 million
- 2024/25: ▲0.346 million
- 2025/26: ▲0.385 million
Location
Notes
- Passenger statistics from the Office of Rail and Road

Darwen railway station serves Darwen, a town in Lancashire, England. It was opened in 1847 by the Bolton, Blackburn, Clitheroe and West Yorkshire Railway, which was subsequently taken over by the Lancashire and Yorkshire Railway twelve years later. It is now served by Northern Trains services on the Ribble Valley Line from Rochdale/Manchester Victoria to Blackburn and into Clitheroe.

Darwen is set amongst the hills of East Lancashire. Arriving from or departing towards Bolton involves journeying through the long Sough Tunnel, some 2,015 yd (1,843 m) in length.

== History ==
The railway line between Blackburn (Bolton Road) and Bolton was built by the Blackburn, Darwen and Bolton Railway, but it had amalgamated with the Blackburn, Clitheroe and North Western Junction Railway to form the Bolton, Blackburn, Clitheroe and West Yorkshire Railway by the time that the first section, from Blackburn to Sough, including the station at Over Darwen, 4 1/4 miles (6.8 km) from Blackburn, was opened on 3 August 1847. The station was renamed Darwen on 1 December 1883.

The neighbouring stations either side which also served the area, at Lower Darwen and Spring Vale, were both closed in 1958 and the nearest surviving station to the south is now Entwistle.

== Facilities ==
The station has two platforms. It is one of only two passing points on the otherwise single track Blackburn to Bolton part of the route, but trains normally cross here only in the morning and evening peak periods. The loop was extended in length by a mile (1.6 km) either side of the station during a six-week-long engineering blockade in July & August 2015 to increase capacity on the line and eventually allow a half-hourly service to operate (as specified in the new Northern franchise agreement, due to come into effect in April 2016).

The station is currently unstaffed, with waiting shelters on each platform; step-free access is available to both. Ticket machines are available, along with a long-line P.A system and passenger information screens to convey train running information.

== Services ==
Since the December 2017 timetable change, the weekdays and Saturday service to Blackburn northbound and to Bolton and Manchester Victoria southbound is now half-hourly all day. Alternate northbound trains continue through to Clitheroe, whilst nearly all southbound trains continue beyond Manchester to Rochdale. On Sundays the service is usually hourly to both Clitheroe and Manchester.

Preceding station	National Rail	Following station
Blackburn	Northern Trains; Ribble Valley Line	Entwistle or Bromley Cross
	Historical railways	
Goosehouse; Line open, station closed	Lancashire and Yorkshire Railway; Blackburn, Darwen and Bolton Railway	Spring Vale; Line open, station closed
