= Newsholme, Lancashire =

Village in Lancashire, England

Coordinates: 53.959°N 2.245°W

Newsholme
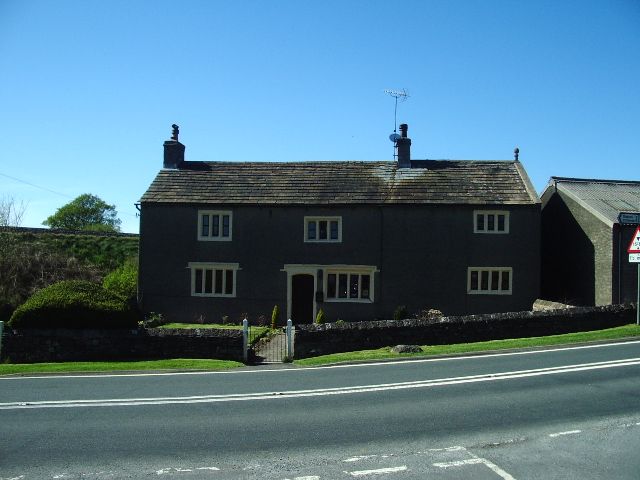
- Stankas Hall Farmhouse

- Shown within Ribble Valley Location within Lancashire
- Population: 50 (2001 Census)
- OS grid reference: SD839514
- Civil parish: Newsholme
- District: Ribble Valley
- Shire county: Lancashire
- Region: North West
- Country: England
- Sovereign state: United Kingdom
- Post town: CLITHEROE
- Postcode district: BB7
- Dialling code: 01200
- Police: Lancashire
- Fire: Lancashire
- Ambulance: North West
- UK Parliament: Ribble Valley

Newsholme is a small village and civil parish in the Ribble Valley, Lancashire, England, but lies within the historic West Riding of Yorkshire. According to the 2001 census, the parish had a population of 50, however the United Kingdom Census 2011 grouped the parish with Horton and Paythorne (2001 pop. 76 and 95), giving a total of 253. Today it lies near the boundary with North Yorkshire on the A682, 4 miles (6 km) north of Barnoldswick and 12 miles (19 km) west of Skipton.

The parish adjoins the Ribble Valley parishes of Paythorne and Horton, and the parish of Hellifield in the county of North Yorkshire.

In the west of the parish, on high ground overlooking the River Ribble, are the remains of a late Anglo-Saxon or early Norman Ringwork castle, called Castle Haugh but also known locally as Cromwell's Basin. On the eastern side of the village, next to Demesne Farm is the site of a Medieval Manorial Hall called the Old Hall.

Between 1872 and 1957 the village had a railway station on the Ribble Valley Line.

Newsholme was once a township in the ancient parish of Gisburn, in the Staincliffe Wapentake of the West Riding of Yorkshire. This became a civil parish in 1866, forming part of the Bowland Rural District from 1894 to 1974. It has since become part of the Lancashire borough of Ribble Valley.

Along with Rimington, Gisburn, Middop, Gisburn Forest, Paythorne and Horton, the parish forms the Gisburn, Rimington ward of Ribble Valley Borough Council.

The Pennine Bridleway National Trail and Ribble Way pass through the parish, crossing the Ribble on the Paythorne Bridge.

== Media gallery ==
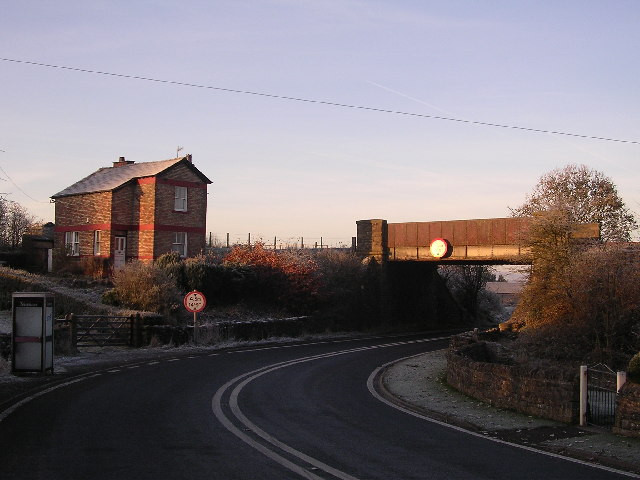
Newsholme Railway Bridge on the Ribble Valley Line.

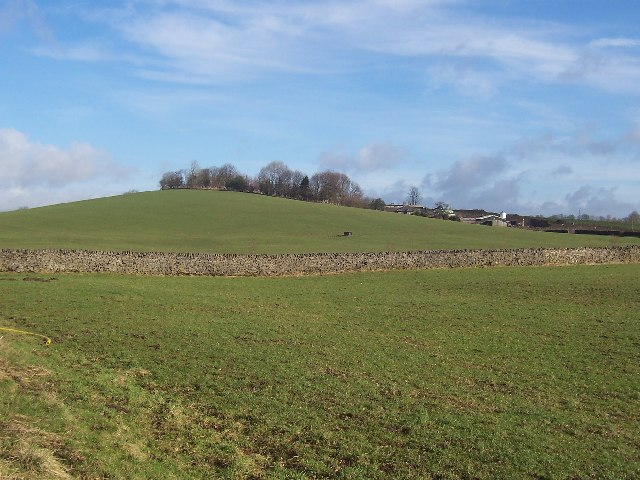
Middle Breaks Hill and Farm.

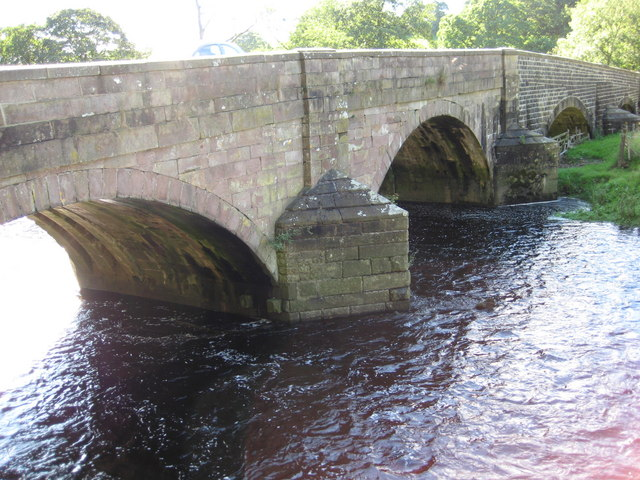
Paythorne Bridge over the River Ribble.

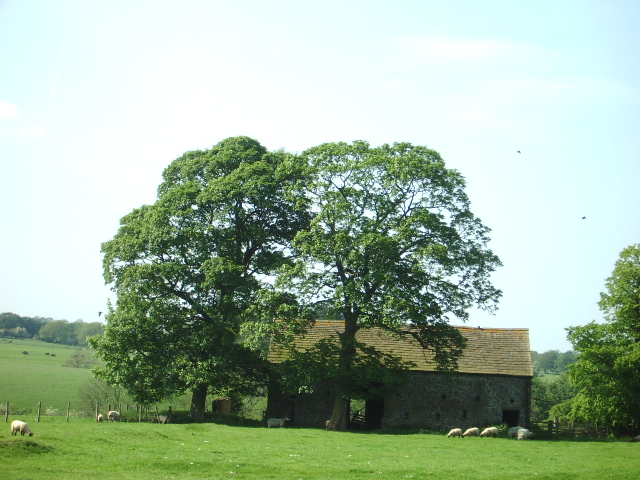
Old Barn at Low Laithe.

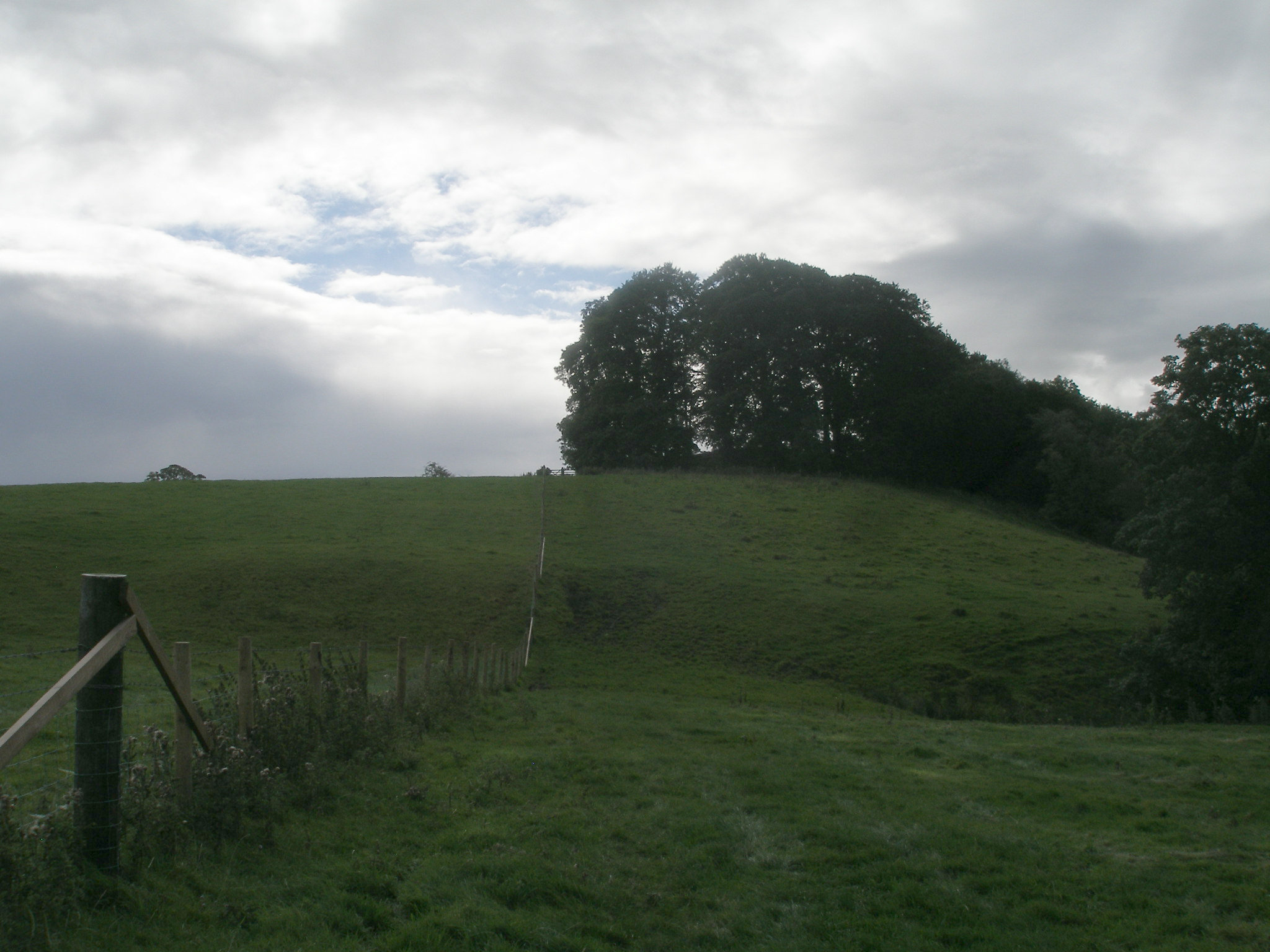
The site of Castle Haugh viewed from the Pennine Bridleway.

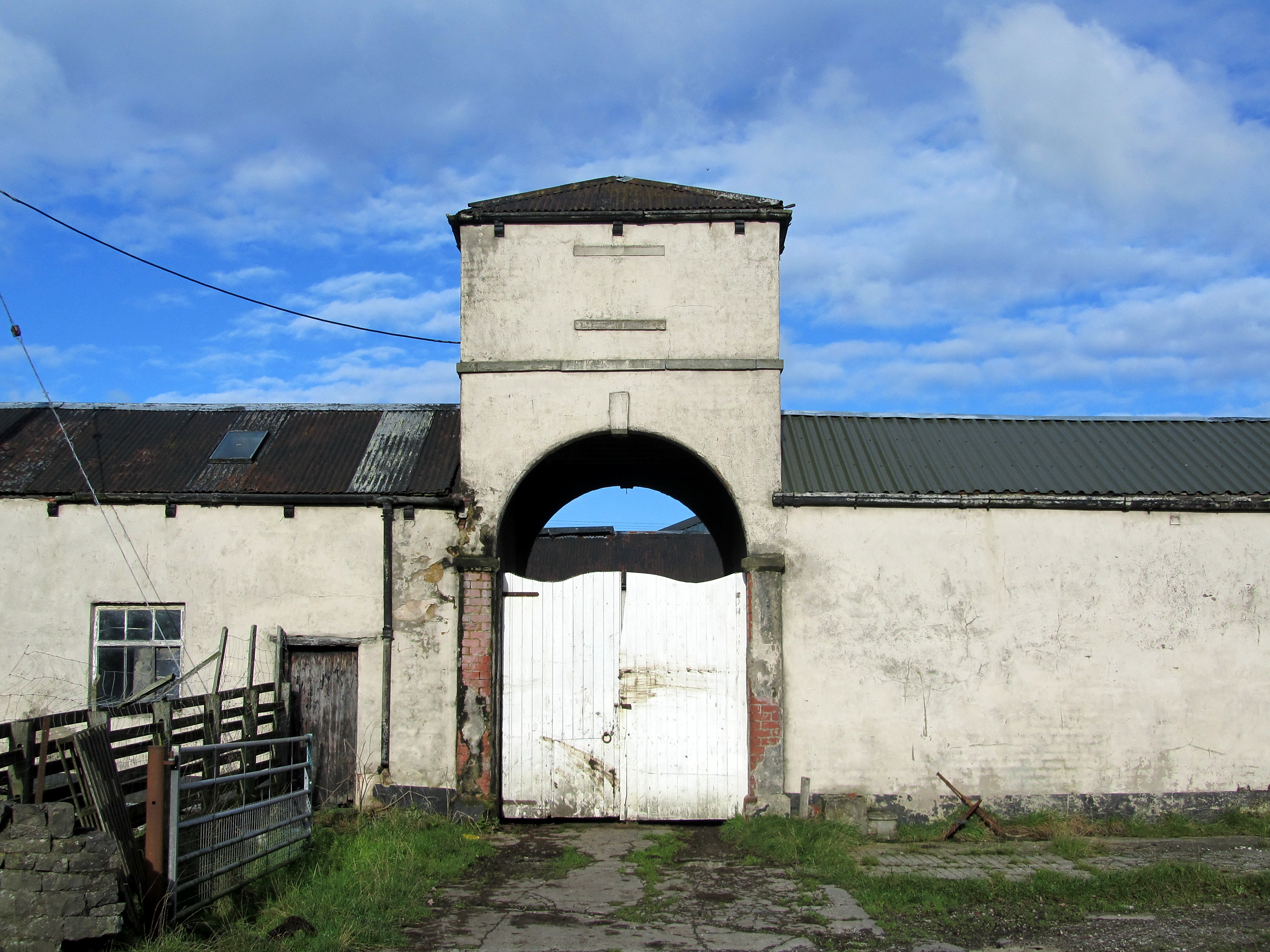
Demesne Farm.

== See also ==
- Listed buildings in Newsholme, Lancashire
- Scheduled monuments in Lancashire
