= Bromley Cross railway station =

Railway station in Greater Manchester, England

Coordinates: 53.61411°N 2.41081°W

Bromley Cross
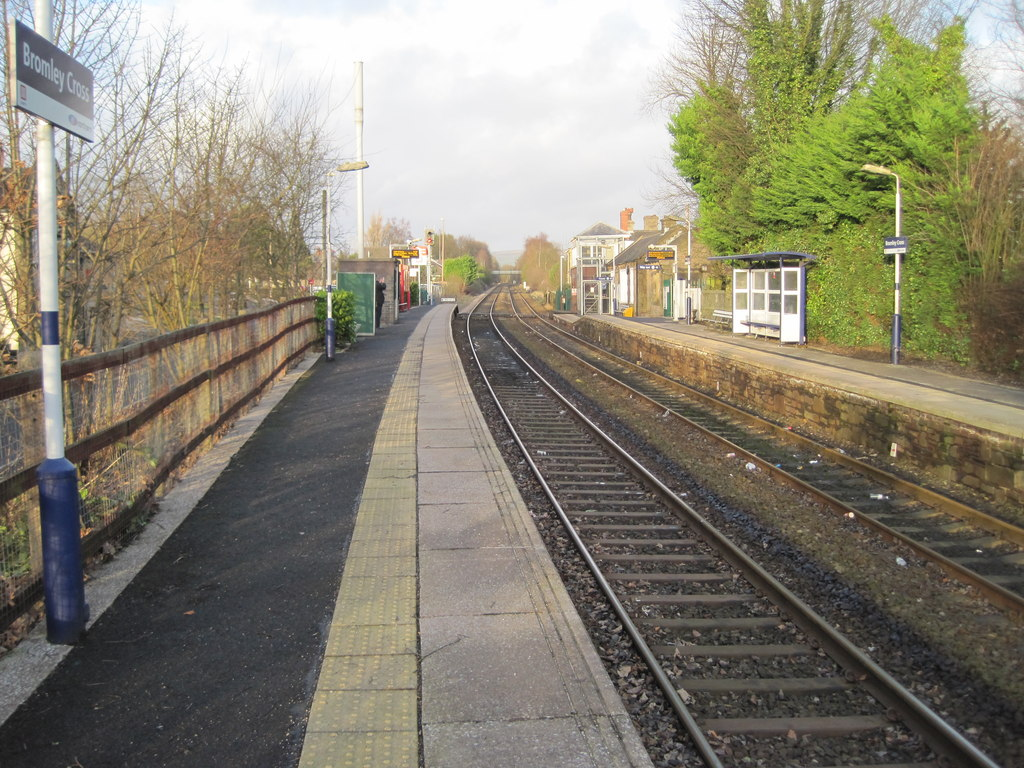
- Bromley Cross railway station in 2012.

General information
- Location: Bolton, Bolton; England
- Grid reference: SD729131
- Manager: Northern Trains
- Platforms: 2

Other information
- Station code: BMC
- Classification: DfT category E

History
- Opened: 1848

Passengers
- 2021/22: ▲0.211 million
- 2022/23: ▲0.239 million
- 2023/24: ▲0.264 million
- 2024/25: ▲0.312 million
- 2025/26: ▲0.343 million
Location
Notes
- Passenger statistics from the Office of Rail and Road

Bromley Cross railway station, on Chapeltown Road in Bromley Cross, a suburb to the north of Bolton, England, is served by the Northern 'Ribble Valley' line 2 3/4 miles (4.4 km) north of Bolton.

== History ==
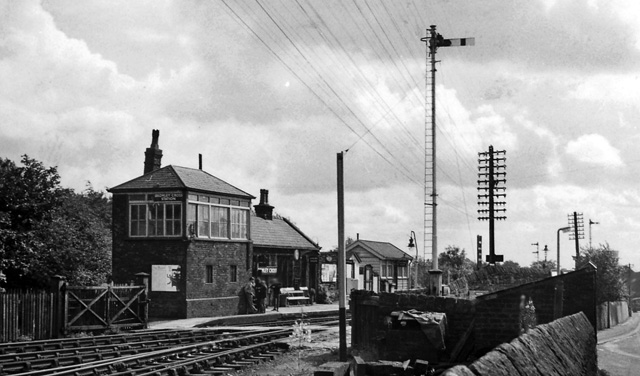
Bromley Cross Station in 1963

Grade II-listed Bromley Cross Railway Station was established in June 1848, on a branch line authorised by an Act of 30 June 1845, initially by the Blackburn, Darwen and Bolton Railway and was originally provided with a temporary, timber station 'building', described in one local newspaper report of 1854 as a 'cold wooden shed'. This founding railway merged to become The Bolton, Blackburn, Clitheroe and West Yorkshire Railway in 1847, which later became part of the Lancashire and Yorkshire Railway (L&YR) in 1858. Permanent station buildings were provided along the line in 1859, constructed with locally quarried sandstone, by Joseph Greenup and Co of Manchester. The original minutes of the railway company held at the National Archives, Kew, reveal that the engineers drew up the plans for the 1859 building, the estimated cost being £350, which also included building a 'detached cottage' which survives next to the signal box. The dimensions of the original station building are approx. 39 ft in length by 15 ft wide. A minute from later that year (6 December 1859) recorded that 'permanent platforms' at the station were now 'in the course of erection'. There was a raising of the platform heights 'fully a foot the whole length' in 1886, the local newspaper reporting 'a goodly number of men being engaged on the work'.

The working goods yard at the station was a crucial part of a country station's existence and two surviving memos sent in 1874 to Bromley Cross refer to the delivery of cheese and tins of lard etc. to the local Co-op stores and also that goods despatched could have problems; 'all in this truck very wet when received here'.

Though built as double track (and used by expresses to and from Scotland from 1880), the line to the north was singled by British Rail in 1973 as part of the East Lancashire line resignalling scheme. Some of the line southwards toward Bolton was also reduced to single track in 1985 (again due to signalling modernisation work), though the double track portion through the station was retained to act as a passing loop. The station was owned by the London Midland and Scottish Railway in 1923, and the London Midland Region of British Railways, as it was known after nationalisation in January 1948.

== Services ==
The former franchise operator Arriva Rail North announced a much enhanced all-day half-hourly service on weekdays and Saturdays in both directions from December 2017, rather than merely at morning and evening peak periods as before. The additional services however start/terminate at Blackburn, so the service through to Clitheroe remains hourly.

== Facilities ==
The station is staffed on a part-time basis (mornings and early afternoons only, Monday to Saturday), with a ticket office and waiting room on the southbound platform. A ticket machine is also available for use outside opening hours and for the collection of pre-paid/advance purchase tickets.

== Station clock ==
The station clock was probably installed in the early 1900s and is clearly seen on a 1912 photograph, with an identical clock noted on a 1905 photograph of once nearby Turton Station. The clock has a London Midland Scottish Railway (LMSR) identity number, an oval brass disc nailed onto the clock's long case (LMS 9994), this number indicating that the clock was installed by the L&YR before the creation of the LMS in 1923.

== Grade II listing ==
The 1848 original low-level platform, the 1859 station building, and the 1875 signal box were all Grade II listed in early 2015.

== Signal box ==
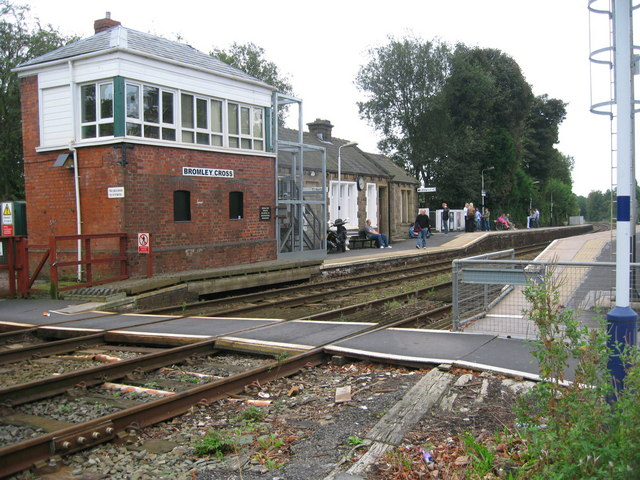
Bromley Cross Station showing original low-level platform and signal box

The Grade II-listed signal box at the station is a Smith and Yardley type 1 brick box opened in December 1875, almost certainly timed to service the new connections to short sidings that were opened that winter, these works being checked and then approved with minor modifications by the Board of Trade inspector Colonel Hutchinson in documentation dated February 1876. One interesting requirement was that the wicket gates had to be locked by levers in the signal cabin and this basic protection can now be dated with certainty to that time. The box, one of three types, was supplied by Manchester-based Emily Sophia Yardley, a widow who had taken over her late husband's ironmongery business, together with her step-brother William Smith, who was recorded in the April 1861 Census records as being an 'engineer' aged 21. The extension to the goods yard at the station by the early 1900s, together with new loop lines and increased signalling, brought about an enlargement of the lever frame in the signal box. Inserting this new frame probably required the partial removal of some of the front brickwork of the 1875 cabin. This can be seen today in the distinct contrast between much older brick lower down and a quite different brick face on the upper area. The signal box has an operating floor which is 8 ft 7in above the platform level, according to early LYR Engineer's Office drawings. Bromley Cross signal box formerly acted as a 'fringe' to the power boxes at Preston (which controls the line to Blackburn) and Manchester Piccadilly (which supervises the passing loop and line south towards Bolton) – their train description systems were incompatible with each other and so the box here was retained to act as a link between them. Its sole use now is to supervise the adjacent pedestrian foot crossing and the protecting signals (with four working levers), since the interface between the two signalling centres has been upgraded so that they can communicate directly. In circa 2004 the signal box was modernised with timber work replaced in PVC (the windows were replaced in a different pattern), and new steel steps and an oversized metal safety cage finally added.

== See also ==
- Listed buildings in South Turton

== Notes ==
Preceding station	National Rail	Following station
Entwistle or Darwen	Northern Trains; Ribble Valley line	Hall i' th' Wood
	Disused railways	
Turton and Edgworth	L&YR; Ribble Valley Line	The Oaks
