= The Oaks railway station =

Former railway station in England

The Oaks

General information
- Location: Bromley Cross, Bolton; England
- Coordinates: 53.60443°N 2.41217°W
- Grid reference: SD728121
- Platforms: 2

Other information
- Status: Disused

History
- Original company: Bolton, Blackburn, Clitheroe and West Yorkshire Railway
- Pre-grouping: Lancashire and Yorkshire Railway
- Post-grouping: London, Midland and Scottish Railway

Key dates
- January 1850: Opened
- 6 November 1950: Closed to passengers
Location

The Oaks railway station served the community of The Oaks in Bromley Cross, Lancashire, England, from 1850 to 1950.

== History ==
The station was possibly opened by the Bolton, Blackburn, Clitheroe and West Yorkshire Railway (BBC&WYR) in January 1850, although an earlier date of 1849 is given by W. D. Tattersall in his book about the branch line. The station was a request stop until 1852. The short length original low height platform survives, as replicated at nearby Bromley Cross. It is 11 1/2 mi (18.5 km) from Blackburn, and 2 miles, 438 yards distance from Bolton. The BBC&WYR was renamed the Blackburn Railway on 24 July 1851, and was amalgamated into the Lancashire and Yorkshire (LYR) and East Lancashire Railways (ELR) on 1 January 1858. It became wholly owned by the LYR in 1859 when the ELR amalgamated with the LYR.

Henry Ashworth, cotton mill owner and deputy chairman of the BBC&WYR, claimed £6,492 from the company for nine acres of land bordering The Oaks, his Georgian home. He was awarded £4,100 at arbitration, resulting in his resignation from the railway company, causing nervousness among the railway's proprietors, who had expected the wealthy member of the local hierarchy to take a large shareholding. He held 50 shares in the Blackburn, Darwen and Bolton company.

The minutes of the railway company held at the National Archives, Kew, reveal that the contract to build more substantial stone station buildings along the branch line in 1859 included a 'station and cottage attached' for The Oaks at the estimated cost of £270. The station building survives next to the level crossing and its design features are replicated in the building that survives at Turton railway crossing, higher up the line towards Entwistle and there are also design similarities with the cottage that survives at nearby Bromley Cross, all built as part of the same original contract. The Oaks was expanded in 1886, with raised platforms, a timber waiting room on the Blackburn departure side and a stone booking hall in what is now the front garden of the former station (now a private house) at the level crossing. The building next to the booking hall was divided into two parts, the station master's house to the right and the part closest to the railway sub-divided into a lamp and porters' room at the corner nearest the crossing, a general waiting room and ladies waiting room with attached WC. The men's WCs and urinals were at the northern end of the building. Further works were carried out in the early 1900s, when the platforms were reconstructed on two passing loops. The contract was awarded to J. C. & F. Woods for £2,696 on 20 November 1901. The new platforms were reported to be 230 ft long. No provision was made for a goods yard at this station. The Oaks station closed on 6 November 1950.

== Signal box ==
A signal box recorded as a Yardley/Smith type 1 brick structure, as at Bromley Cross, equipped with a 20 lever Smith frame was located close to the level crossing. It opened in 1875. It received a new L&Y frame to control the southern end of the loops installed in 1902. The original box was replaced in November 1942 by a LMS ARP type 13 box fitted with a 20 lever REC rear-mounted frame, positioned on the up side (Bolton bound), just to the north of the station. The replacement box closed in October 1966 when the loops were taken out of use. The gates of the level crossing were never locked or controlled by the lever frame, unlike Bromley Cross.

== Incidents ==
In 1906, L&YR Class 5 2-4-2T No. 869 suffered a boiler explosion at the station. Both crew members were injured, but survived.

Preceding station	Historical railways	Following station
Bromley Cross	L&YR; Ribble Valley Line	Bolton
