= Middop =

Hamlet in Lancashire, England

Coordinates: 53.904°N 2.241°W

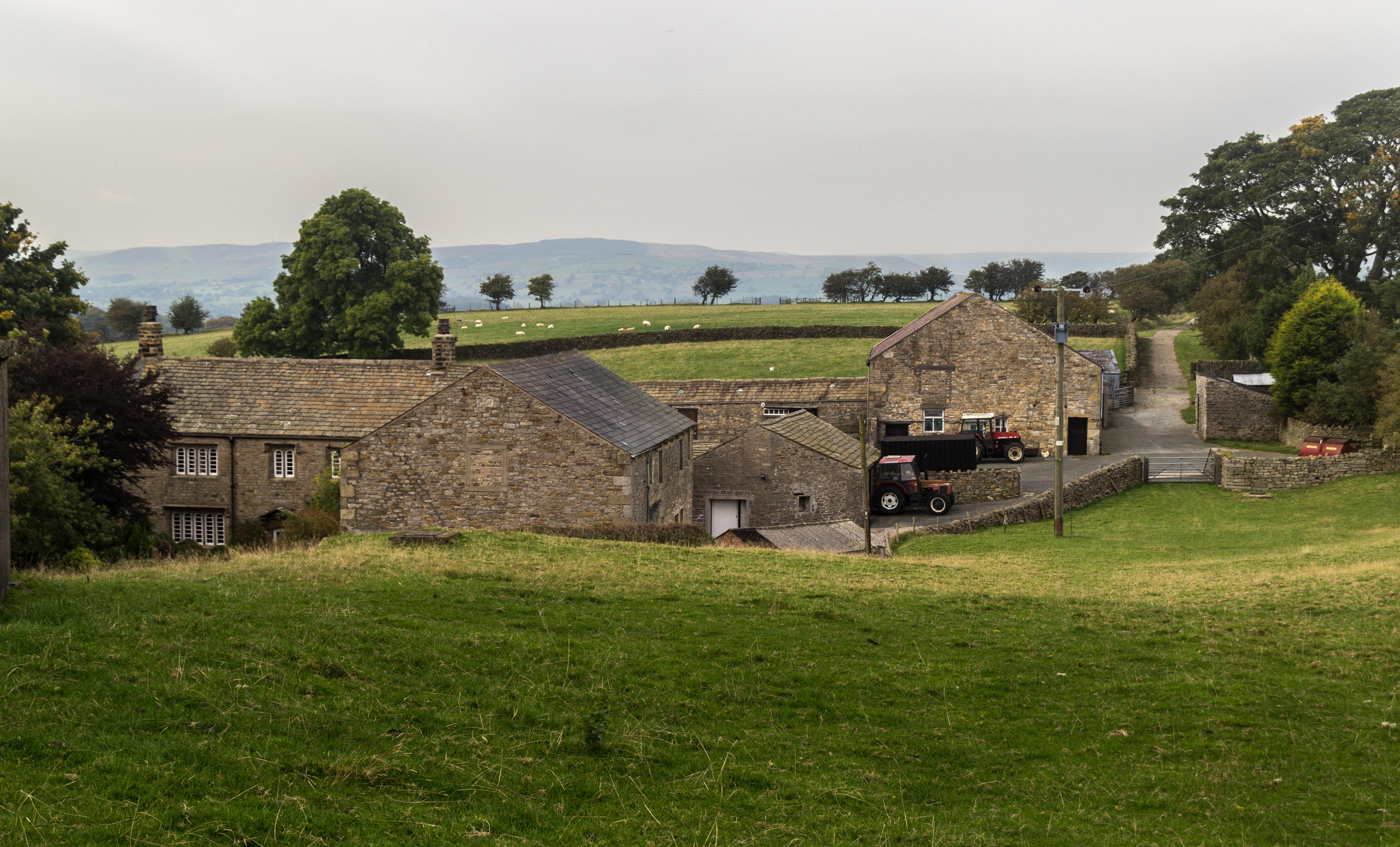
- Middop Hall

- Shown within Ribble Valley Location within Lancashire
- Population: 43 (2001 Census)
- OS grid reference: SD841453
- Civil parish: Middop
- District: Ribble Valley
- Shire county: Lancashire
- Region: North West
- Country: England
- Sovereign state: United Kingdom
- Post town: CLITHEROE
- Postcode district: BB7
- Dialling code: 01200
- Police: Lancashire
- Fire: Lancashire
- Ambulance: North West
- UK Parliament: Ribble Valley

Middop is a rural hamlet and civil parish in Lancashire, England. It is in Ribble Valley district. Middop is near the villages of Rimington and Gisburn and approximately 8 miles (13 km) north-east of its post town, Clitheroe. In the 2001 United Kingdom census, Middop had a population of 43. Owing to the limited population from the 2011 Census details are included in the parish of Rimington.

The parish adjoins the Ribble Valley parish of Rimington the Pendle parishes of Blacko and Bracewell and Brogden.

Middop has four Grade II listed buildings and structures, Middop Hall, Newfield Edge Hall, a boundary stone and a milestone.

Middop was once a township in the ancient parish of Gisburn, in the Staincliffe Wapentake of the West Riding of Yorkshire. This became a civil parish in 1866, forming part of the Bowland Rural District from 1894 to 1974. It has since become part of the Lancashire borough of Ribble Valley. It shares its parish council with Rimington.

Along with Rimington, Gisburn, Gisburn Forest, Paythorne, Newsholme and Horton, the parish forms the Gisburn, Rimington ward of Ribble Valley Borough Council.

== Media gallery ==
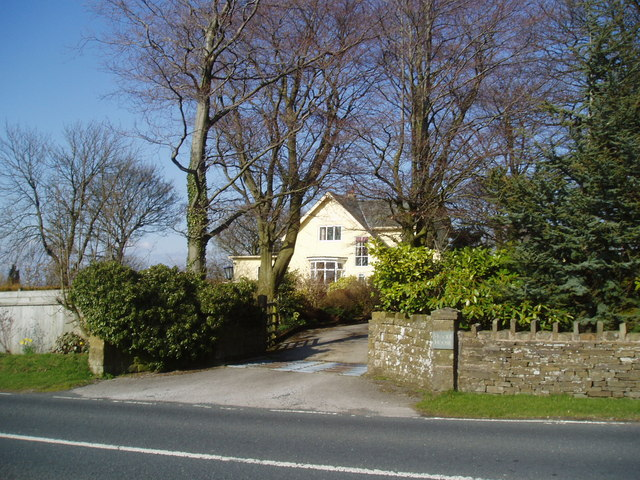
Stocks House.

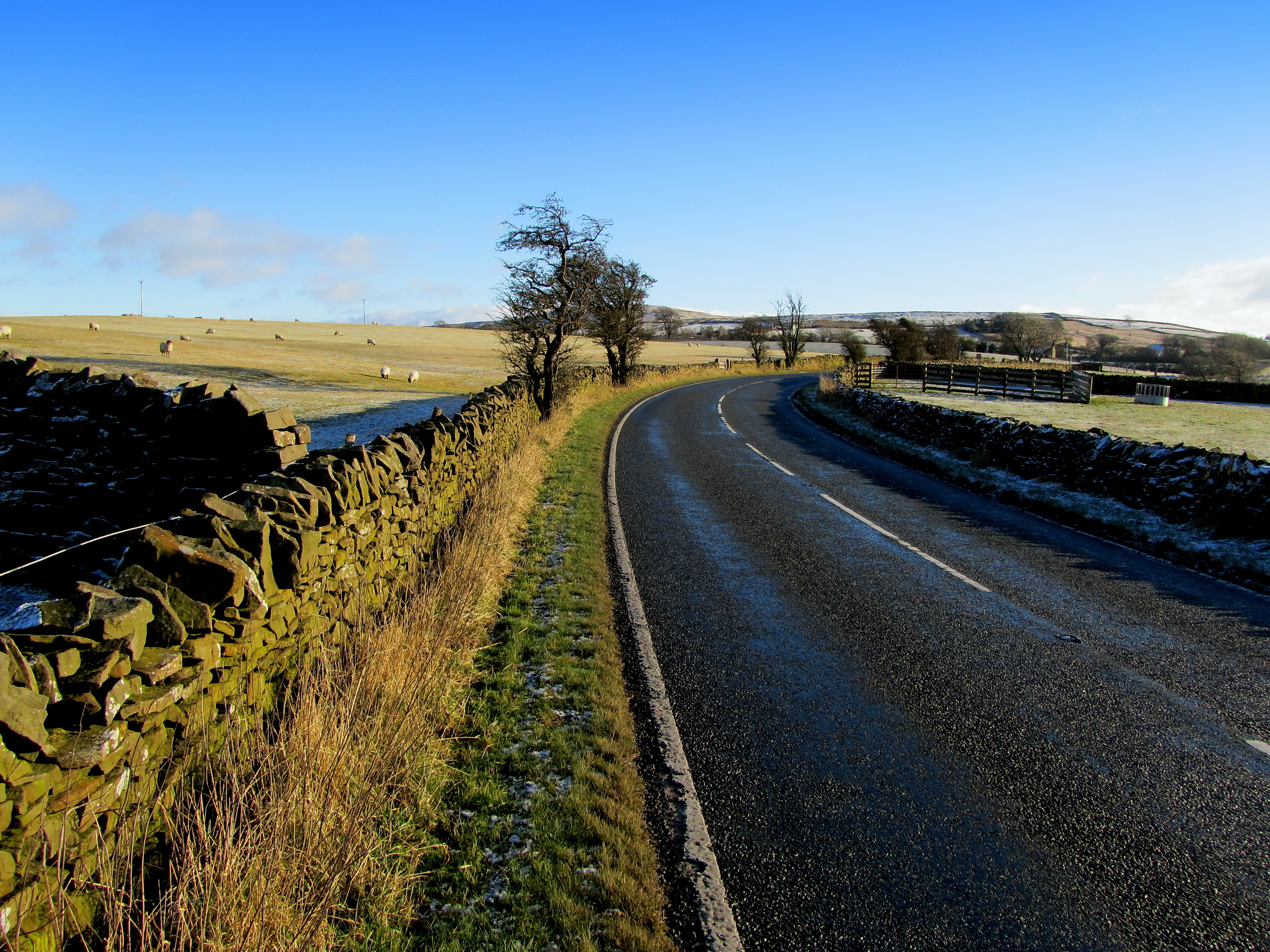
The A682 passes through the parish.

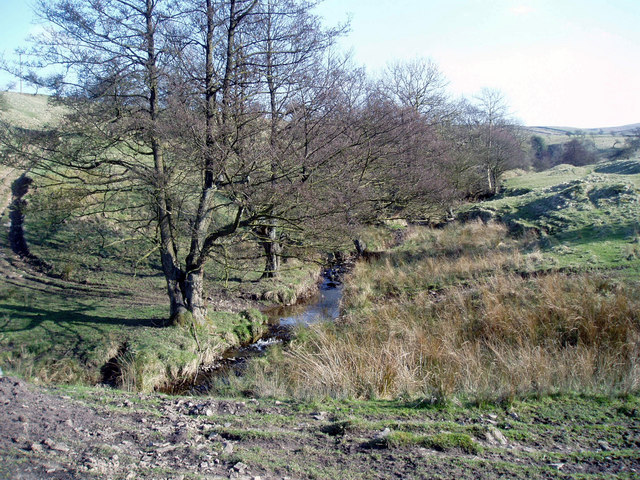
Crag Clough on the northern boundary with Rimington.

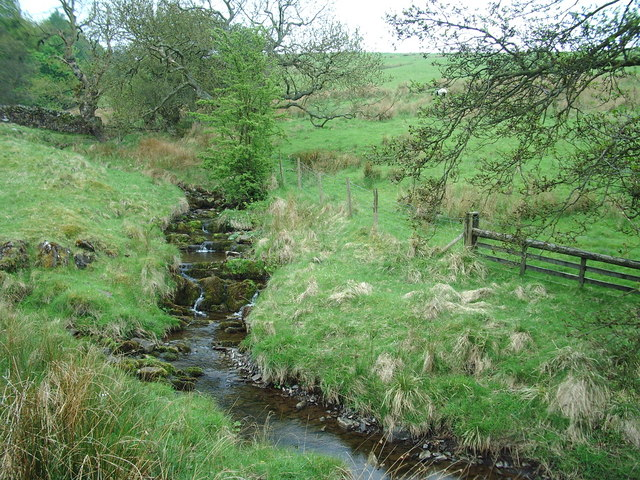
Howgill Beck on the western boundary with Rimington.

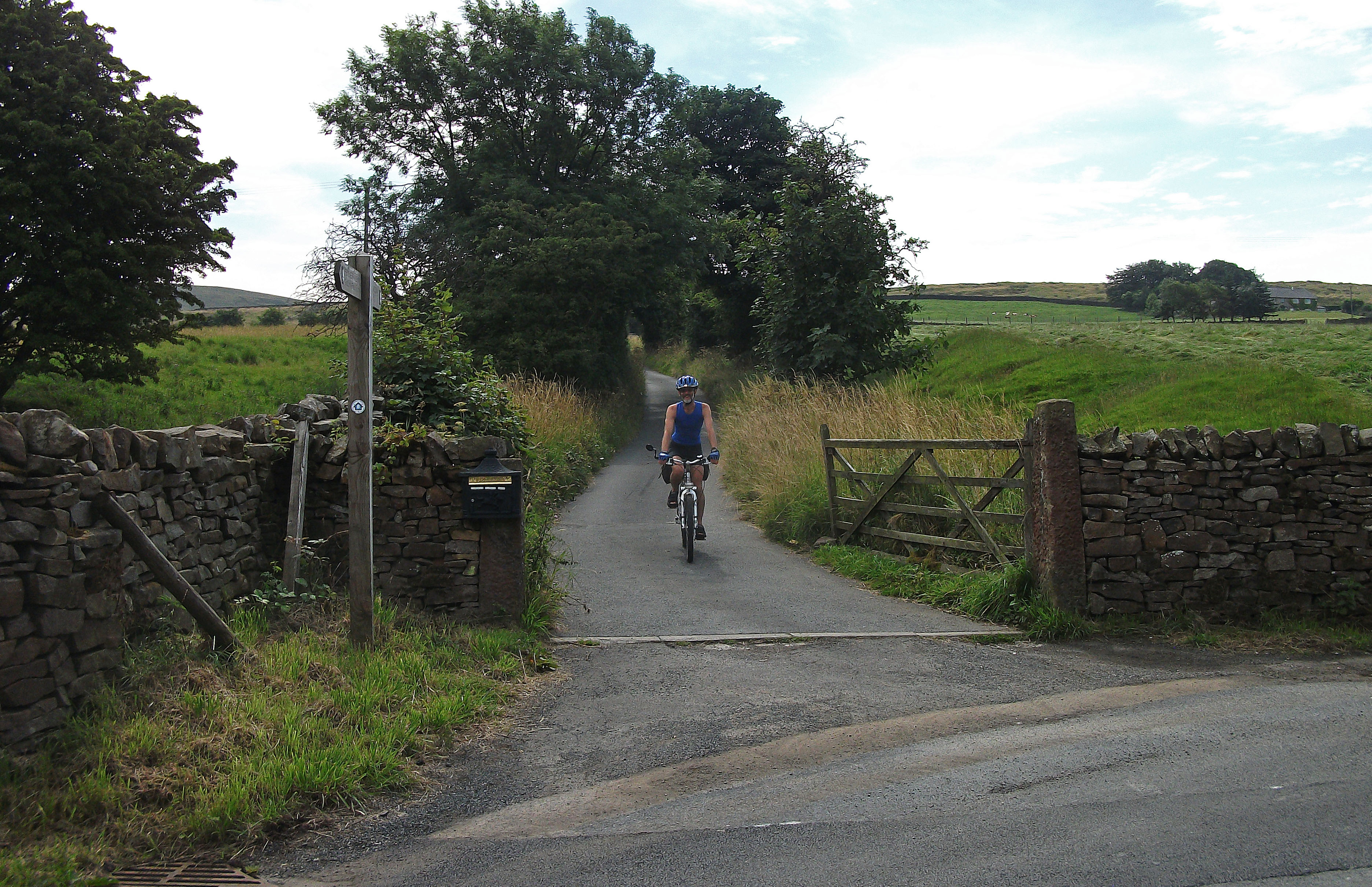
Gisburn Old Road forms the boundary with Bracewell and Brogden and is part of the Pennine Bridleway.

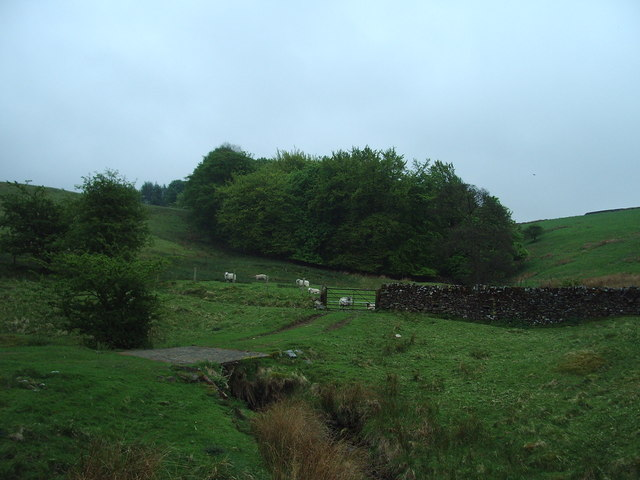
Middop Wood.

== See also ==
- Listed buildings in Middop
