= Lower Darwen railway station =

Former railway station in England

Lower Darwen

General information
- Location: Lower Darwen, Blackburn with Darwen; England
- Coordinates: 53.7227°N 2.4722°W

Other information
- Status: Disused

History
- Original company: Bolton, Blackburn, Clitheroe and West Yorkshire Railway
- Pre-grouping: Lancashire and Yorkshire Railway
- Post-grouping: London, Midland and Scottish Railway

Key dates
- 3 August 1847: Opened
- 3 November 1958: Closed to passengers
Location

Lower Darwen railway station was a railway station that served the village of Lower Darwen, in Lancashire, England.

== History ==
The railway line between Blackburn (Bolton Road) and Bolton was built by the Blackburn, Darwen and Bolton Railway, but it had amalgamated with the Blackburn, Clitheroe and North Western Junction Railway to form the Bolton, Blackburn, Clitheroe and West Yorkshire Railway by the time that the first section, from Blackburn to Sough, including the station at Lower Darwen, 2 1/2 miles (4.0 km) from Blackburn, was opened on 3 August 1847. The station was closed on 3 November 1958 by British Railways, and subsequently was demolished.

Lower Darwen motive power depot, which closed in the 1960s, was located to the north of the station, near the Ewood area of Blackburn.

== Location ==
The station was located to the north of the B6231 Fore Street, which the railway crosses on Rakes Bridge.

== Site today ==
The line on which the station was situated remains open with services between Clitheroe/Blackburn and Manchester Victoria being operated by Northern.

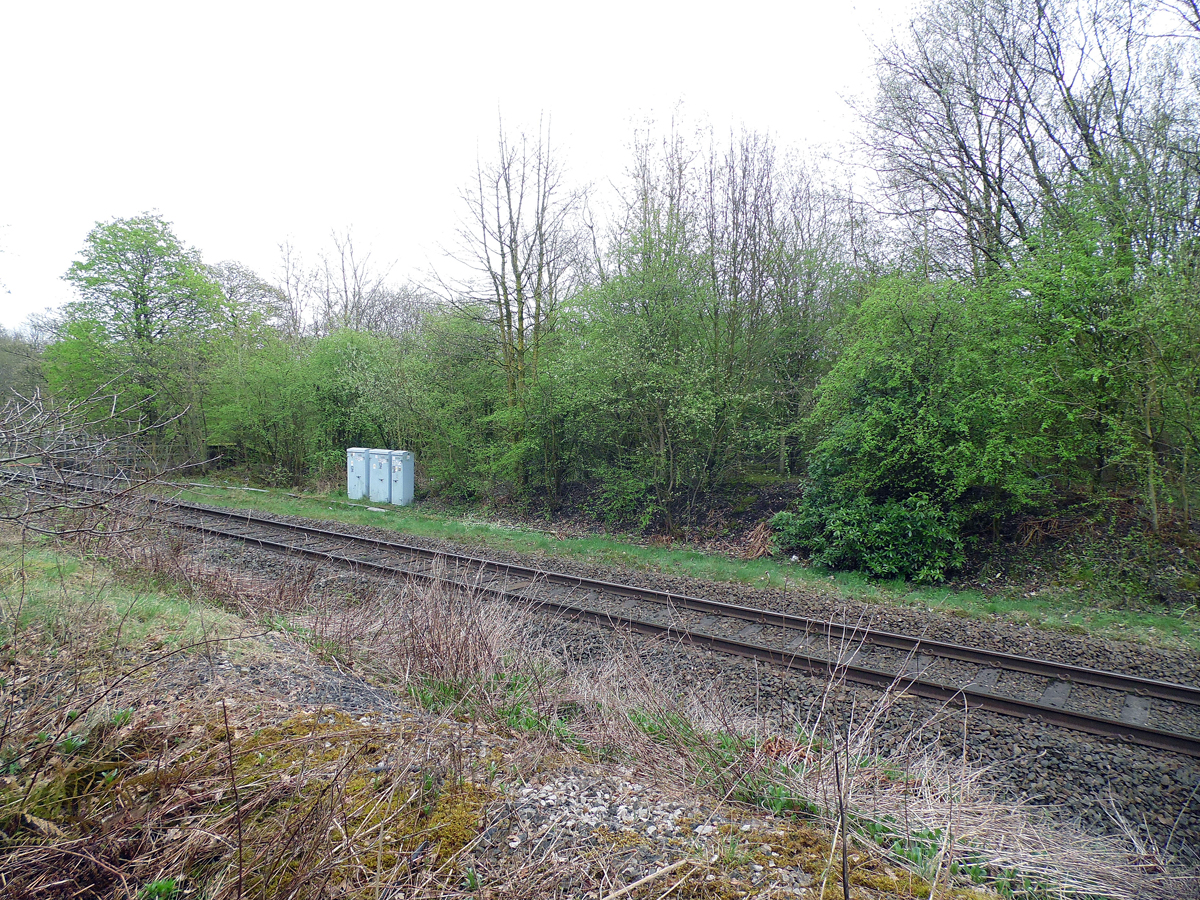
Lower Darwen Railway Station April 2018

| Preceding station | Historical railways | Following station |
|---|---|---|
| Blackburn Bolton Road; Line and station closed Blackburn; Line and station open | Lancashire and Yorkshire Railway; Blackburn, Darwen and Bolton Railway | Goosehouse; Line open, station closed |
