= Rimington railway station =

Disused railway station in Lancashire, England

Coordinates: 53.9107°N 2.3064°W

Rimington

General information
- Location: Rimington, Ribble Valley, Lancashire; England
- Platforms: 2

Other information
- Status: Disused

History
- Pre-grouping: Lancashire and Yorkshire Railway
- Post-grouping: London, Midland and Scottish Railway

Key dates
- 1879: Opened
- 1958: Closed to passengers
Location

Rimington railway station was a railway station that served the small village of Rimington in Lancashire. It was built by the Lancashire and Yorkshire Railway. It was closed in July 1958, some four years prior to the withdrawal of passenger trains over the route.

== Services ==
| Preceding station | Historical railways | Following station |
|---|---|---|
| Gisburn; Line open, station closed | Lancashire and Yorkshire Railway; Blackburn Railway | Chatburn; Line open, station closed |
