= Listed buildings in Newsholme, Lancashire =

Newsholme is a civil parish in Ribble Valley, Lancashire, England. It contains eight listed buildings that are recorded in the National Heritage List for England. All of the listed buildings are designated at Grade II, the lowest of the three grades, which is applied to "buildings of national importance and special interest". Apart from the village of Newsholme, the parish is entirely rural. The listed buildings consist of four farmhouses, a former toll house, and two milestones.

== Buildings ==
Name and location	Photograph	Date	Notes
Paythorne Bridge; 53.95716°N 2.25895°W		17th century (probable)	The bridge carries a road over the River Ribble. It is in sandstone and consists of two segmental arches with two cutwaters on each side. The bridge has a solid parapet, coping, and piers at the ends. On the northwest approach are abutments largely in limestone that contain two arches for flood water. The bridge is also a scheduled monument.
Listers Farmhouse; 53.95957°N 2.24532°W	—	1675	The farmhouse is in pebbledashed stone with a stone-slate roof, and has two storeys and three bays. The windows are mullioned, and the doorway has a chamfered surround, an elliptical head, and an inscribed lintel.
Stankas Hall Farmhouse; 53.96112°N 2.24210°W		Late 17th century	A stone house with a stone-slate roof, in two storeys and three-bays. The windows have moulded surrounds, and are mullioned. The doorway also has a moulded surround and a Tudor arched head.
Harper's Farmhouse; 53.96124°N 2.24170°W	—	Early 19th century	A limestone house with a stone-slate roof in two storeys and with a symmetrical two-bay front. The doorway and windows have plain surrounds. It has two-light sash windows separated by a mullion, and the doorway has a moulded pediment.
Milestone; 53.95928°N 2.24565°W	—	Early 19th century (probable)	The milestone is in sandstone, and has a wedge-shaped plan with a rounded top. It is inscribed with the distances in miles to Gisburn and to Settle.
Milestone; 53.94949°N 2.26027°W	—	Early 19th century (probable)	The milestone is in sandstone, and has a wedge-shaped plan with a rounded top. It is inscribed with the distances in miles to Gisburn and to Settle.
Toll House; 53.95721°N 2.25190°W	—	Early 19th century	The former toll house is in sandstone with a slate roof. It has an octagonal plan, with two storeys. The windows and doorway have plain stone surrounds.
Denholme Farmhouse; 53.96124°N 2.24147°W	—	1838	A pebbledashed stone house with a stone-slate roof, in two storeys and three bays. The windows and doorway have plain surrounds. The windows are sashes, and the central doorway has a plain surround and a moulded pediment containing the date.
