= Spring Vale railway station =

Former railway station in England

Spring Vale

General information
- Location: Spring Vale, Blackburn with Darwen; England
- Coordinates: 53.6868°N 2.4572°W
- Platforms: 2

Other information
- Status: Disused

History
- Original company: Bolton, Blackburn, Clitheroe and West Yorkshire Railway
- Pre-grouping: Lancashire and Yorkshire Railway
- Post-grouping: London, Midland and Scottish Railway

Key dates
- 3 August 1847: Opened as Sough; terminus of line
- 12 June 1848: Line extended to Bolton
- November 1870: Renamed Spring Vale and Sough
- 1 March 1877: Renamed Spring Vale
- 5 August 1958: Closed to passengers
Location

Spring Vale railway station was a railway station that served the community of Spring Vale, in Darwen, Lancashire, England. It was opened by the Bolton, Blackburn, Clitheroe and West Yorkshire Railway on 3 August 1847, and was originally named Sough. At first, it was the southern terminus of the line from Blackburn (Bolton Road); the line south of Sough to Bolton opened on 12 June 1848 and was just located south of the road bridge at the top off Cranberry Lane The station was moved 150 yards north and was renamed Spring Vale and Sough in November 1870, and Spring Vale on 1 March 1877. It was closed on 5 August 1958, two days after nearby Lower Darwen. It achieved noteworthiness when, on the night of 25 September 1931, Mahatma Gandhi alighted from a train there to spend the night with a local family whilst visiting England to see the effects of his cotton making campaign on the British textile industry.

Preceding station	Historical railways	Following station
Darwen; Line and station open	Lancashire and Yorkshire Railway; Blackburn, Darwen and Bolton Railway	Entwistle; Line and station open
