= Listed buildings in Middop =

Middop is a civil parish in Ribble Valley, Lancashire, England. It contains four listed buildings that are recorded in the National Heritage List for England. All of the listed buildings are designated at Grade II, the lowest of the three grades, which is applied to "buildings of national importance and special interest". The parish is entirely rural, and the listed buildings consist of two houses, one with an attached farm building, a milestone, and a boundary stone.

== Buildings ==
Name and location	Photograph	Date	Notes
Middop Hall and farm building 53.90380°N 2.25339°W		c. 1600	The house and barn are in sandstone. The house has a stone-slate roof, and is in two storeys and two bays. The windows are mullioned, and the central doorway has a chamfered surround, a triangular head, and an open pediment. The farm building is at right angles and dates from the 19th century. It has a slate roof, and contains re-set material from Sawley Abbey.
Newfield Edge Hall; 53.90234°N 2.23630°W	—	Mid 18th century	A sandstone house with a stone-slate roof, in two storeys and three bays. The windows are mullioned, and on the front is a single-storey porch. At the rear is a stair window with a round head, and a mullion and a transom.
Milestone; 53.89785°N 2.23524°W	—	Early 19th century (probable)	The milestone is in sandstone, it has a wedge-shaped plan and a rounded top. The left face is inscribed with the distance in miles to Gisburn.
Boundary stone 53.89190°N 2.22357°W	—	19th century	The boundary stone is in sandstone and is roughly rectangular in plan with a rounded top. The left face is inscribed "Middop".
