= Newsholme railway station =

Disused railway station in Lancashire, England

Coordinates: 53.9587°N 2.2462°W

Newsholme
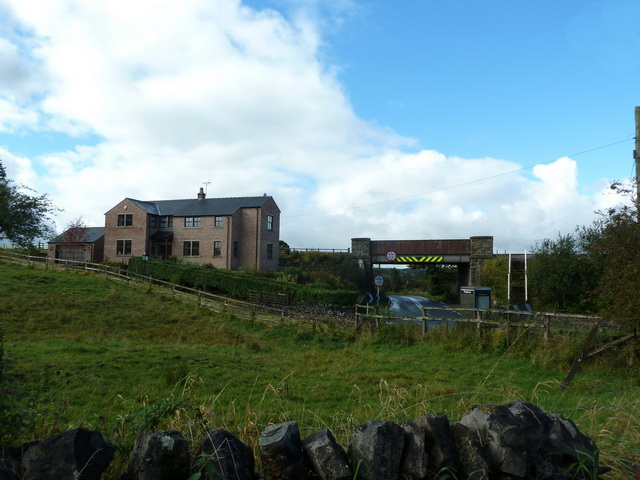
- Station house and railway bridge (2012)

General information
- Location: Newsholme, Ribble Valley, Lancashire; England
- Platforms: 2

Other information
- Status: Disused

History
- Pre-grouping: Lancashire and Yorkshire Railway
- Post-grouping: London, Midland and Scottish Railway

Key dates
- 1880: Opened
- 1957: Closed to passengers
Location

Newsholme railway station was a railway station that served the small village of Newsholme in Lancashire. It was built by the Lancashire and Yorkshire Railway. It was closed in 1957.

== Services ==
Preceding station	Historical railways	Following station
Hellifield; Line and station open	Lancashire and Yorkshire Railway; Blackburn Railway	Gisburn; Line open, station closed
