= James Brandwood =

English Quaker minister

James Brandwood (1739–1826) was an English Quaker minister.

== Life ==
Brandwood was born at New House in Entwistle, near Rochdale, Lancashire, England, on 11 November 1739; his parents were of yeoman stock. After a visit to the Friends' meeting at Crawshawbooth, Brandwood ceased to attend the services at Turton chapel. He never married, and practised as a land surveyor and conveyancer, and is also said to have acted as the steward of the Turton estate. He had the character of a plain, conscientious countryman, and after his death a selection from his letters on religious subjects was published.

Brandwood joined the Quakers in 1761, and a meeting was shortly afterwards settled at Edgworth, where he lived for many years. His religious views deprived him of his fair share in the patrimonial inheritance, and he received only an annuity of £25. As a recognised minister of the Society of Friends he visited various parts of England, and in 1787 went to Wales in company with James Birch. In the 'testimony' respecting him we are told: "About the sixtieth year of his age, this, our dear friend, through a combination of circumstances, appeared to be in some degree under a cloud; he became less diligent in attending meetings, and in 1813 was discontinued as an acknowledged minister". In 1824, when he settled at Westhoughton, he was reinstated as a minister, and visited many of the southern meetings. He died on 23 March 1826. He was buried in the Friends' burial-ground at Westhoughton.

== Writings ==
A selection was made from his letters and papers. These were edited by John Bradshaw of Manchester, and deal with matters of religious experience, ranging in date from 1782 to 1823. The earliest is an essay On War, Oaths, and Gospel Ministry, and the latest is a letter to a clergyman of the church of England, written when the author was in his eighty-fourth year. They were published in 1828, two years after Brandwood's death.
