= Listed buildings in Rimington =

Rimington is a civil parish in Ribble Valley, Lancashire, England. It contains twelve listed buildings that are recorded in the National Heritage List for England. All of the listed buildings are designated at Grade II, the lowest of the three grades, which is applied to "buildings of national importance and special interest". The parish contains the village of Rimington, and other small settlements, and is otherwise rural. Almost all the listed buildings are house, farmhouses and farm buildings, the others being three milestones, and a chapel with an attached manse.

== Buildings ==
Name and location	Photograph	Date	Notes
Lower Gills Farmhouse; 53.89870°N 2.26994°W	—	1698	A rendered stone house with a slate roof, in two storeys and three bays, with an outshut at the rear. Most of the windows are mullioned, and the doorway has a plain surround and a hood of two pitched slates.
Clough Head; 53.89083°N 2.27248°W	—	1702	A sandstone house with a stone-slate roof in two storeys. On the north front is a two-storey gabled porch. The doorway has a chamfered surround and a shaped inscribed lintel, and the windows are mullioned.
Milestone; 53.92357°N 2.26348°W	—	18th century	The milestone is in sandstone and has a triangular plan. Its worn inscriptions indicate, in archaic spelling, the distances in miles to Burnley, to Clitheroe, and to Gisburn.
The Old Farmhouse; 53.90737°N 2.29963°W	—	Mid 18th century	A sandstone house with a modern tile roof in two storeys and two bays. The windows have three lights and are mullioned, and the doorway has a chamfered surround.
Bustards Farmhouse; 53.90674°N 2.30063°W		Late 18th century	The farmhouse is in sandstone with a stone-slate roof, and has two storeys and two bays. The windows are mullioned with two lights, and the doorway has a plain surround. Above the doorway is a recessed blank sandstone panel.
Higher Gazegill Farmhouse and barn 53.91240°N 2.26812°W	—	Late 18th century	The house and barn are in sandstone with a stone-slate roof. The house has two storeys and two bays. It has three-light mullioned windows, and a central doorway with a plain surround and a hood of two pitched slates. The barn to the left has a wide entrance with a segmental-arched head, a window, and two pitching holes.
Wood Farmhouse; 53.90218°N 2.31469°W	—	Late 18th century	The house is in pebbledashed stone with a slate roof, in two storeys and two bays. The windows on the front have three lights and mullions. There are doorways on the front and the rear, each with a plain surround and a hood of two pitched slates. At the rear is a stair window with two transoms.
Halstead Farmhouse; 53.91040°N 2.29220°W		1783	A sandstone house with a modern tile roof in two storeys and two bays. The windows have three lights and are mullioned. The doorway has an open pediment on square brackets, and above it is an inscribed plaque. In the rear wall is a stair window with a semicircular head, a keystone, and impost blocks.
Aynhams House; 53.91305°N 2.28782°W	—	1812	A limestone house with a stone-slate roof, in two storeys and two bays. The windows are sashes with six panes, and the central doorway has a plain surround and an open pediment on consoles brackets.
Milestone; 53.92043°N 2.26254°W	—	Early 19th century (probable)	The milestone is in sandstone, and has a wedge-shaped plan and a rounded top. It is inscribed with the distances in miles to Burnley and to Gisburn.
Milestone; 53.90991°N 2.24742°W	—	Early 19th century (probable)	The milestone is in sandstone, and has a wedge-shaped plan and a rounded top. It is inscribed with the distances in miles to Burnley and to Gisburn.
Salem Congregational Chapel and Manse; 53.90736°N 2.27400°W		Early 19th century	The chapel and manse are in sandstone with a stone-slate roof, and have two storeys. The chapel contains four windows that have plain surrounds, semicircular heads, keystones and impost blocks, and two doors with plain surrounds. In the centre is an inscribed sundial. The manse to the right has two sash windows and a door.
