= Gisburn railway station =

Disused railway station in Lancashire, England

Gisburn
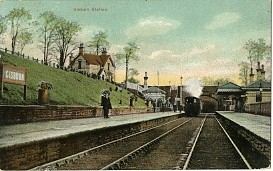
- A postcard image of Gisburn railway station in 1907

General information
- Location: Gisburn, Ribble Valley, Lancashire; England
- Coordinates: 53.9358°N 2.2669°W
- Platforms: 2

Other information
- Status: Disused

History
- Original company: Lancashire and Yorkshire Railway
- Post-grouping: London, Midland and Scottish Railway

Key dates
- 2 June 1879: Opened
- 10 September 1962: Closed to passengers
Location

Gisburn railway station served the small village of Gisburn, which is now in Lancashire, England, but was in the West Riding of Yorkshire at the time. It was opened by the Lancashire and Yorkshire Railway in 1879. The station closed to passengers in September 1962, shortly before the Beeching Report was published.

== Services ==
Preceding station	Historical railways	Following station
Newsholme; Line open, station closed	Lancashire and Yorkshire Railway; Blackburn Railway	Rimington; Line open, station closed
