= Smith and Yardley =

English railway signalling firm

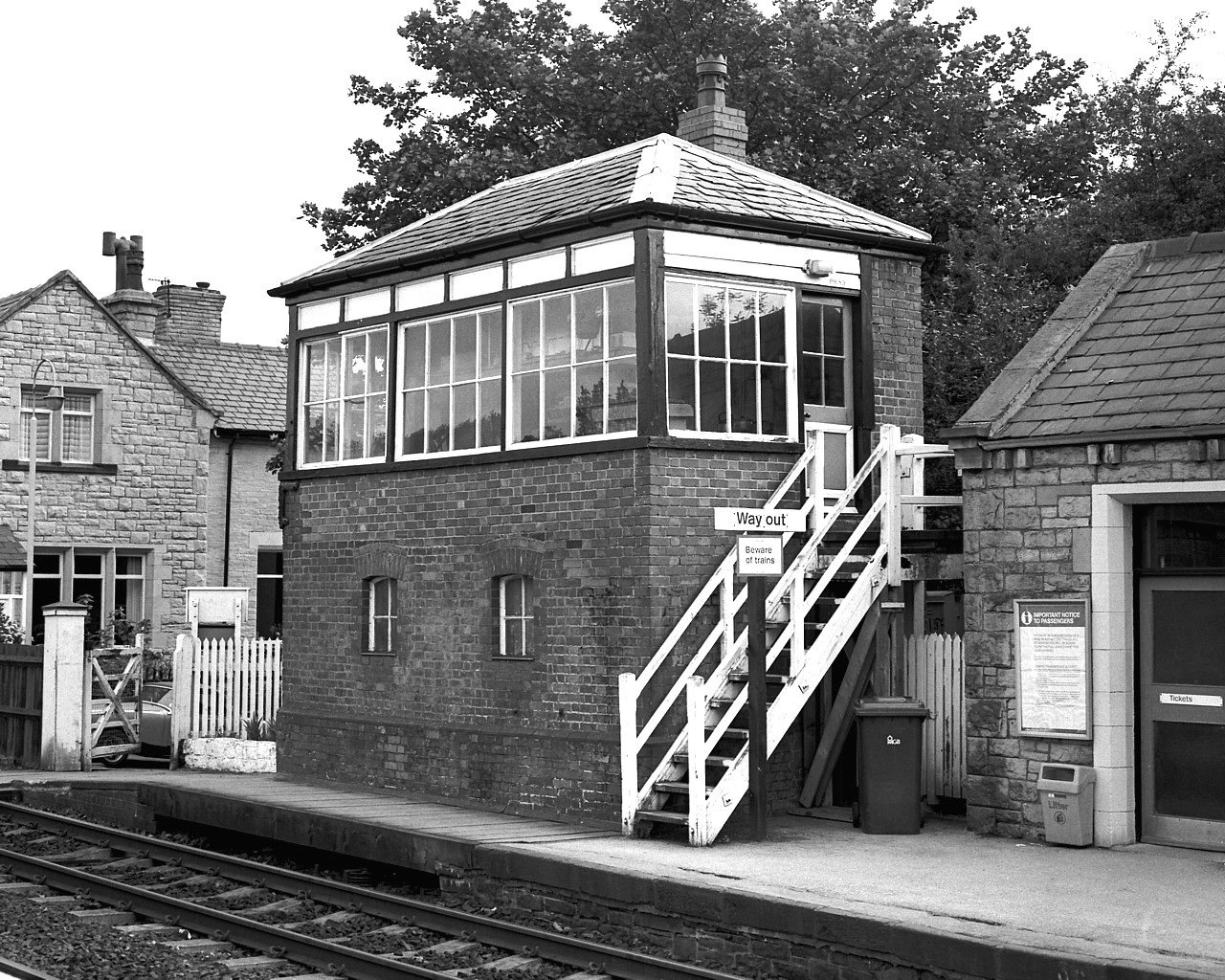
Bromley Cross Station signal box, a Smith and Yardley Type 1 design built for the Lancashire and Yorkshire Railway.

Smith and Yardley (also known as E.S. Yardley & Co.) were a firm of railway signalling and signal box contractors based in Manchester, England, United Kingdom.

== Emily Sophia Yardley ==
Emily Sophia Yardley (1836-1905) was born Emily Sophia Buckley at Talk o' th' Hill, Staffordshire in 1836, the daughter of Thomas Buckley, a butcher and Emily, his wife. Her father died in 1838 and on 1 November of that year her mother married Humphrey Smith, a widower. Emily and her mother moved in with her step-father and his children at Duke Street, Manchester. She married Robert Pearce Yardley an ironmonger of Chorlton-on-Medlock on 2 May 1857 and they lived at 19 Darlington Street, Cheetham Hill, Manchester. However, Robert died, aged 37, on 16 November 1860 leaving his wife as sole executor of the business. The 1861 Census returns for Duke Street shows Emily Sophia living there once again with her (by then twice widowed) mother. She was then described as "ironmonger". Emily Sophia married Robert Cox, a "manufacturer's agent" in 1872. By 1881, she had moved to Battersea with her husband and in 1891 she was in Southport. She died in 1905.

== William Smith ==
William Smith was the half-brother by her mother's second marriage. He was born 26 August 1839, and the 1861 census described him as an engineer, and "deaf and dumb from birth". The 1871 census shows William Smith as "engineer on railway". After 1881, he returned to live with his mother.

== E.S. Yardley & Co. ==
Slater's 1863 Directory of Manchester and Salford shows E.S. Yardley & Co. as a firm of ironmongers at 56 Market Street. About 1871, the firm became involved in the installation of signalling equipment, point connections and the construction of signal boxes for the Lancashire and Yorkshire Railway (L&YR) from their Castlefield Signal Works in Manchester. William Smith took over the firm about 1876. Slater's 1877-8 Directory of Manchester and Salford describes Smith as "a railway plant manufacturer (signal)" at 1 Canal Street, and in 1881 as a "Patent Railway Signal Manufacturer". After 1881, the L&YR entered into an exclusive contract with the Railway Signal Co. and orders to Smith and Yardley dried up. They ceased work on signalling equipment in 1882. The company held several patents under the names of Smith and Yardley, but William Smith held the patents for the lever frames used by the company.

== Smith and Yardley signal boxes ==
Between 1872 and 1882 the firm provided numerous signal boxes for the L&YR, including three that are still standing. The Type 2 box at Milner Royd Junction (near Sowerby Bridge) in 1874, closed in Autumn 2018, and two remaining Type 1 boxes, at Bromley Cross, opened in December 1875, still in use and now Grade II listed by English Heritage, and Type 1 Hensall (also 1875 and listed), closed in May 2014.

== See also ==
Signal boxes that are listed buildings in England
