= Ribble Valley line =

Railway line in North West England

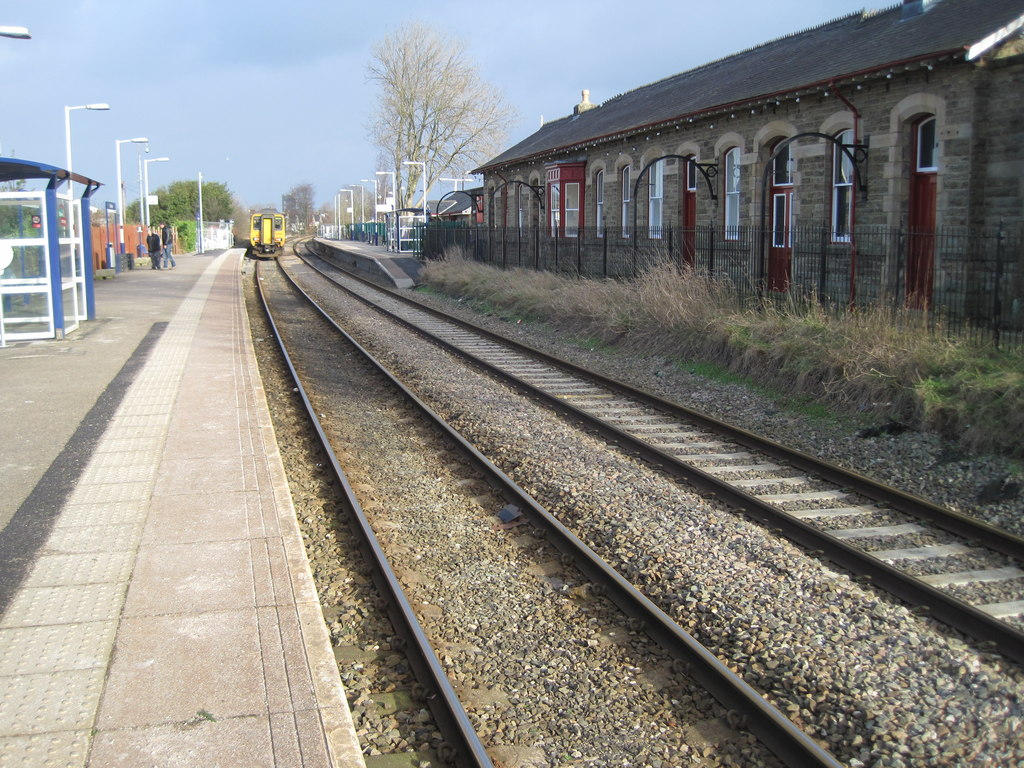
- Clitheroe railway station, on the Ribble Valley line

Overview
- Status: Operational
- Owner: Network Rail
- Locale: Lancashire; Greater Manchester; Blackburn; North West England
- Stations: 14

Service
- System: National Rail
- Rolling stock: Class 150; Class 156; Class 158

Technical
- Track gauge: 4 ft 8 1/2 in (1,435 mm) standard gauge
Route map
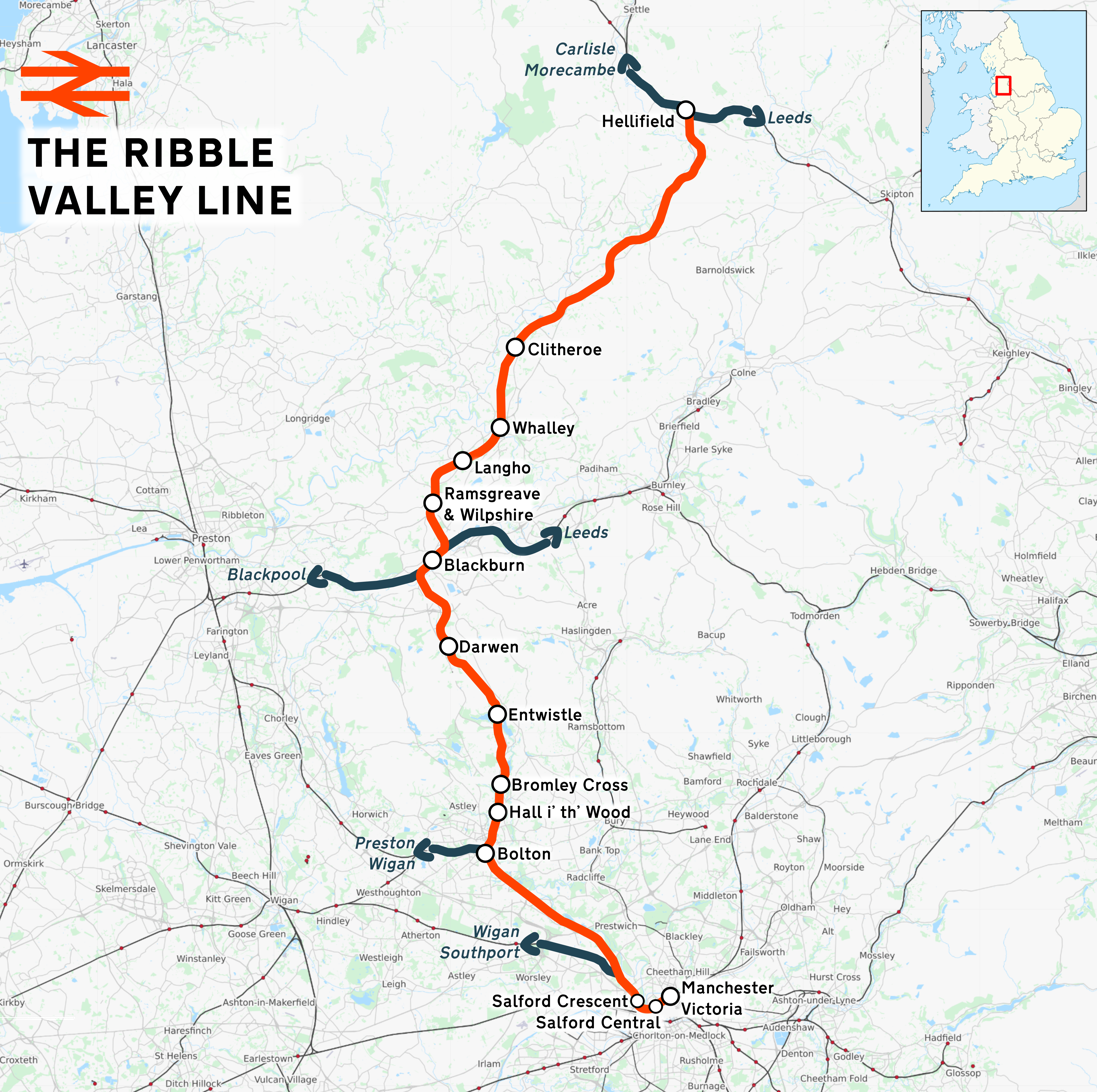
(Click to expand)

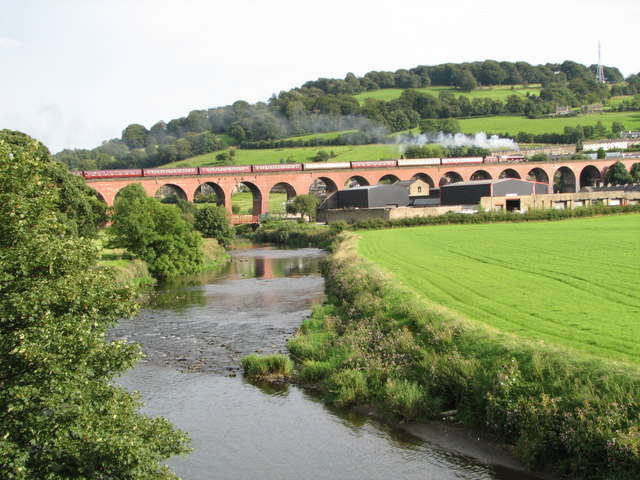
Whalley Viaduct and the River Calder

The Ribble Valley line is a railway line that runs from Manchester Victoria through Blackburn, in Lancashire, to Hellifield in North Yorkshire. Regular passenger services normally run as far as Clitheroe, but occasional passenger services run the whole line through north Lancashire to Hellifield, where there are connections to the Settle–Carlisle and Bentham lines. The line passes over the distinctive 48-span Whalley Viaduct.

The line north of Blackburn was closed to a regular passenger service from September 1962, but remained open for freight, passenger diversions and the occasional DalesRail service. However, in 1994, services between Blackburn and Clitheroe were reinstated after a public campaign. Reopening the line for passengers between Clitheroe and Hellifield has been mentioned in some reports and newspapers to provide connections on the Settle Carlisle line, with the most recent being a business case for the proposal being granted government funds in 2020.

== Early history ==
The Ribble Valley line was built by several different railway companies, all of which later became part of the Lancashire and Yorkshire Railway, and so following the 1923 Grouping the whole line was part of the London, Midland and Scottish Railway.

The southernmost portion of the Ribble Valley line, between Salford and Bolton, was built by the Manchester and Bolton Railway, and opened in 1838; it amalgamated with the Manchester and Leeds Railway (M&LR) in August 1846; a connecting line between Salford and Manchester Victoria was opened in October 1846 and the M&LR amalgamated with other railways in 1847 to form the Lancashire and Yorkshire Railway (LYR). The route connecting Salford with Manchester Victoria was improved in 1865.

Blackburn, Darwen and Bolton Railway Act 1845
- Act of Parliament
- Parliament of the United Kingdom
- Long title: An Act for making a Railway from Blackburn to Bolton in the County of Lancaster, to be called "The Blackburn, Darwen, and Bolton Railway."
- Citation: 8 & 9 Vict. c. xliv

Dates
- Royal assent: 30 June 1845

Blackburn, Darwen and Bolton Railway Act 1846
- Act of Parliament
- Parliament of the United Kingdom
- Long title: An Act to enable the Blackburn, Darwen, and Bolton Railway Company to alter the Line of Part of their Railway.
- Citation: 9 & 10 Vict. c. cccx

Dates
- Royal assent: 3 August 1846

The portion between Bolton and Blackburn Bolton Road was built by the Blackburn, Darwen and Bolton Railway (BD&BR). This company was formed on 27 September 1844, and was authorised by the Blackburn, Darwen and Bolton Railway Act 1845 (8 & 9 Vict. c. xliv) on 30 June 1845 to build a line to Blackburn that would connect with the M&BR at Burnden, to the south of Bolton; on 3 August 1846 the route was amended by the Blackburn, Darwen and Bolton Railway Act 1846 (9 & 10 Vict. c. cccx) so that the BD&BR could use Bolton station. Construction commenced at Darwen on 27 September 1845, and the line was opened between Blackburn and Sough on 3 August 1847. Difficulties were experienced in the construction of Sough Tunnel, and also of the Tonge Viaduct, which collapsed during construction, due to timber centrings being moved before the mortar had thoroughly set. On 12 June 1848 the remainder of the line between Sough and Bolton was opened. To accommodate the Blackburn trains, Bolton station was enlarged in 1871; and in 1888 a curve at the north end of Bolton station allowed trains to run between the Preston and Blackburn lines without needing to reverse in the station.

Blackburn, Clitheroe and North Western Junction Railway Act 1846
- Act of Parliament
- Parliament of the United Kingdom
- Long title: An Act for making a Bailvray, with Branches therefrom, in the County of Lancaster and West Riding of the County of York, to be called "The Blackburn, Clitheroe and North-western Junction Railway."
- Citation: 9 & 10 Vict. c. cclxv

Dates
- Royal assent: 27 July 1846

The route from Blackburn to Hellifield was also opened in two sections. The Blackburn, Clitheroe and North Western Junction Railway (BC&NWJR) was authorised by the Blackburn, Clitheroe and North Western Junction Railway Act 1846 (9 & 10 Vict. c. cclxv) on 27 July 1846 for a line from a junction with the East Lancashire Railway (ELR) at Daisyfield, east of Blackburn, to a junction with the North Western Railway (NWR) near Long Preston. Construction commenced at Clitheroe on 30 December 1846 but was delayed due to the partial collapse of the Whalley viaduct. The line was opened between Blackburn and Chatburn on 21 June 1850, and on the same day, a short branch to the Old Banks lime works at Horrocksford was opened. Trains used the BD&BR station at Blackburn (Bolton Road), running through the ELR station in order to reach it. Initially single track, the line between Daisyfield Junction and Chatburn was doubled in 1872–74.

Blackburn, Darwen and Bolton Railway Amendment Act 1847
- Act of Parliament
- Parliament of the United Kingdom
- Long title: An Act for enabling the Blackburn, Darwen, and Bolton Railway Company to make certain Alterations in the Line of their Railway in the Parishes of Blackburn and Bolton-in-the-Moors; and for amending the Acts relating thereto.
- Citation: 10 & 11 Vict. c. clxiv

Dates
- Royal assent: 9 July 1847

Text of statute as originally enacted

Blackburn Railway Act 1851
- Act of Parliament
- Parliament of the United Kingdom
- Long title: An Act for extending and enlarging the Powers of the Bolton, Blackburn, Clitheroe, and West Yorkshire Railway Company, for changing the Name of the Company, and for other Purposes.
- Citation: 14 & 15 Vict. c. lxxxix

Dates
- Royal assent: 24 July 1851

Text of statute as originally enacted

In March 1847, the BD&BR and the BC&NWJR agreed to amalgamate, becoming the Bolton, Blackburn, Clitheroe and West Yorkshire Railway; the necessary act of Parliament, the Blackburn, Darwen and Bolton Railway Amendment Act 1847 (10 & 11 Vict. c. clxiv) received royal assent on 9 July 1847. The name was shortened to the Blackburn Railway by a further act of Parliament, the Blackburn Railway Act 1851 (14 & 15 Vict. c. lxxxix), of 24 July 1851. In the meantime, the LYR and ELR entered into a working agreement in April 1850, and they began to operate in ways that whilst mutually beneficial, were to the detriment of the Blackburn Railway; for example, the ELR charged the Blackburn Railway a toll equivalent to six miles for the use of three-quarters of a mile of the ELR's line through Blackburn; and later, LYR services from Manchester to Blackburn were routed via Accrington instead of Bolton. During 1856, two extensions to the Blackburn Railway were proposed: one was to continue the line north from Chatburn to the NWR near Giggleswick (at that time known as Settle); the other would have been from a point to the north of Bolton, between the Croal and Tonge viaducts, to Manchester by way of Radcliffe, Whitefield and Cheetham Hill, and so would have created a line between Bolton and Manchester independent of the LYR. Both of these proposals failed.

Blackburn Railway Amalgamation Act 1858
- Act of Parliament
- Parliament of the United Kingdom
- Long title: An Act for vesting the Undertaking of the Blackburn Railway Company in the Lancashire and Yorkshire and East Lancashire Railway Companies; and for other Purposes.
- Citation: 21 & 22 Vict. c. cvi

Dates
- Royal assent: 12 July 1858

On 1 January 1858, the Blackburn Railway became the joint property of the LYR and ELR (this was not authorised by an act of Parliament until the Blackburn Railway Amalgamation Act 1858 (21 & 22 Vict. c. cvi) was passed on 12 July 1858). In 1859, the LYR and ELR themselves amalgamated, the LYR retaining its identity, and so the Blackburn Railway became wholly absorbed by the LYR. From this time, the trains along the former Blackburn Railway lines used the former ELR station at Blackburn.

The NWR was absorbed by the Midland Railway (MR) in 1871, and once the MR began work on its Settle and Carlisle Railway, the LYR decided to resume work on the line north of Chatburn. This was authorised on 24 July 1871, and the 11 1/2 miles (18.5 km) were estimated to cost £220,000. Construction north of Chatburn was resumed by the LYR in 1873, and was opened as far as Gisburn on 2 June 1879 although it was complete as far as Newsholme; the last section, between Gisburn and Hellifield, opened on 1 June 1880.

== Later history ==
The line between Blackburn and Hellifield was closed to passengers on 10 September 1962 but continued to be used for diversions and for freight, and until 15 August 1964 there was a Saturdays-only train from Manchester to Glasgow which used this route. The line between Blackburn and Bolton remained open, but was reduced to single track operation in two stages as part of major resignalling projects on the East Lancashire line (1973) and Bolton area (1985). The line between Blackburn and Hellifield was slated for complete closure in 1983 along with the closure of the Settle and Carlisle line, however, this proposal was dropped in 1989. After a public campaign, the line between Blackburn and Clitheroe was reopened to regular passenger services in 1994, and a Sunday only service was later reintroduced between Clitheroe and Hellifield.

The towns and villages on the route are the following:

- Manchester
- Bolton
- Hall i' th' Wood
- Bromley Cross
- Entwistle
- Darwen
- Blackburn
- Ramsgreave and Wilpshire
- Langho
- Whalley
- Clitheroe

Passenger services from Clitheroe to Rochdale via Blackburn and Manchester Victoria are operated by Northern Trains. On summer Sundays, Northern Trains also operates the DalesRail service, which starts at Blackpool and continues beyond Clitheroe to the Settle–Carlisle line, where it calls at all the stations en route to Carlisle. This service was extended, from mid-September 2013, to cover Sundays throughout the remainder of the year, with trains running as far as Hellifield. It ceased in December 2022 due to a lack of available train crew, but a replacement Saturdays-only service started in June 2024, marketed as the "Yorkshire Dales Explorer" and running up to and from Ribblehead.

The service from Manchester to Clitheroe was designated by the Department for Transport as a community rail service in March 2007. It was announced in March 2007 that major improvements to the line were being proposed by Blackburn with Darwen Council, who unveiled an £8 million bid to the Department for Transport and Network Rail. Improvements may include installing double tracks where presently the route was single line, improved signalling giving increased track capacity, enhanced line speed, longer trains at peak times and ultimately putting on more frequent trains to and from Manchester throughout the day. However, the funding for the scheme was eventually rejected in March 2008.

The line between Blackburn and Clitheroe was temporarily closed in November 2008 due to a major refurbishment. The £5 million scheme included 11,651 yards (10,654 m) of continuous welded rail, 16,000 new concrete or steel sleepers and 40,000 tonnes (44,000 tons) of ballast. Replacement bus services ran between Clitheroe and Blackburn. The line re-opened on 28 November 2008.

In 2009, a scheme called "Pennine Lancashire" proposed new housing, tourist attractions and improved transport links, supported by the Labour Government and Prime Minister of that time. The scheme included enhancements to the Ribble Valley line including:

- new signalling
- doubling single track lines
- increased line-speeds
- new rolling stock
- extending platform lengths

The scheme was welcomed by the Ribble Valley Rail group, who have campaigned to re-open the line and were very excited at the proposals.

Network Rail has carried out £14 million of improvements to track & signalling either side of Darwen station in July and August 2015. A six-week engineering blockade saw the existing passing loop there extended by 1-mile (1.6 km)) at each end and signalling improvements made to add capacity on the line and allow for service frequencies between Bolton and Blackburn to be doubled to two trains per hour each way throughout the day from December 2017. The work was completed on schedule and the line reopened on 24 August 2015.

== Possible reopening ==
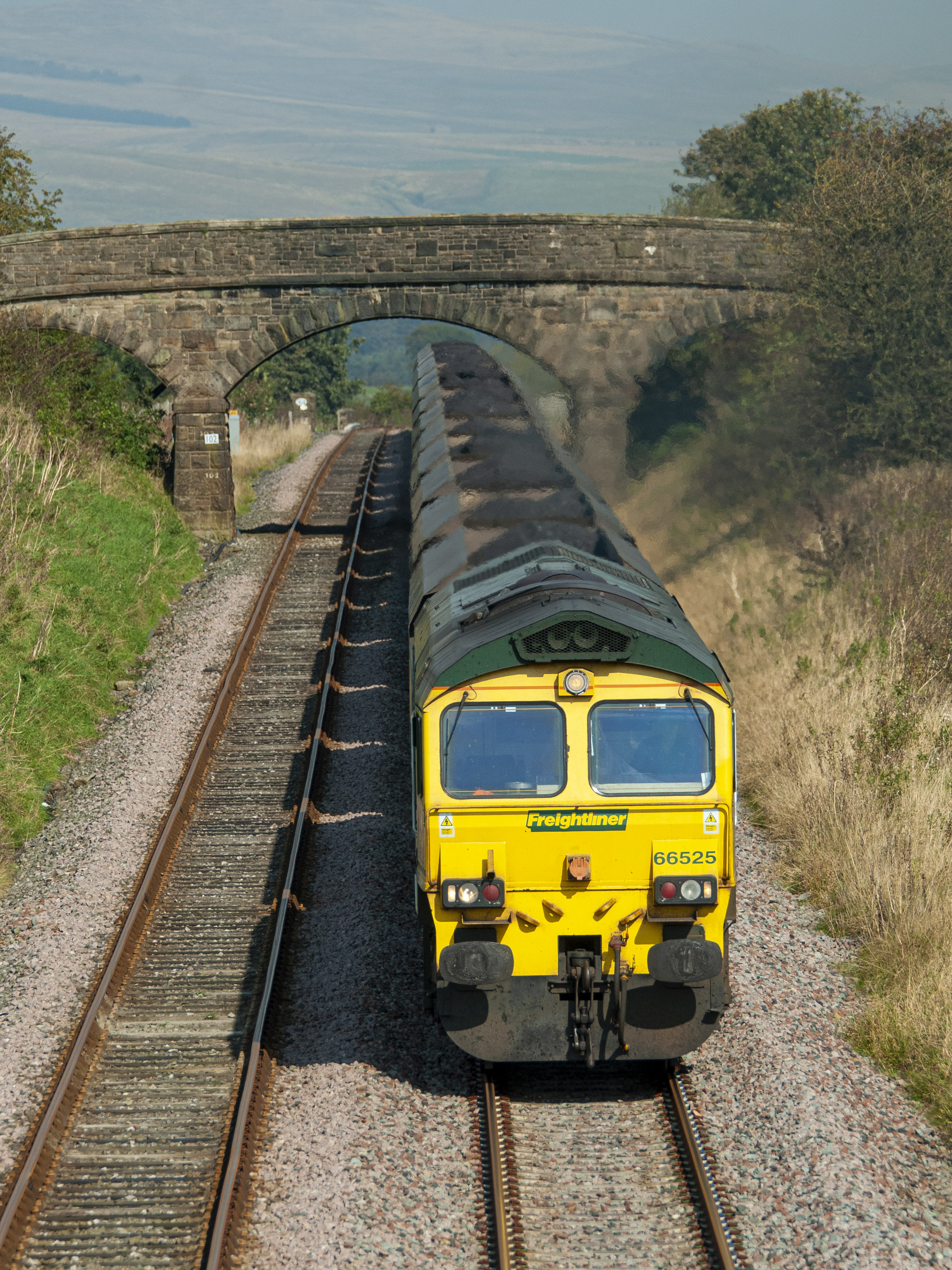
66525 at Newsholme with a loaded coal train from Killoch in Ayrshire. This is close to the site of the old Newsholme railway station

The line has been a useful diversionary route for when the West Coast Main Line (WCML) has been closed for repairs and has also seen freight traffic use it. There have been periodic calls for the final section north from Clitheroe to be re-opened to passenger traffic to provide a connection with the Leeds to Carlisle services at Hellifield. In 2020, the UK Government announced a £500 million fund to enable groups and campaigners to pay for business cases on reopening proposals. The section of line between Hellifield and Clitheroe was in the initial ten proposals that were approved for funding by the government.

The bid by campaigners suggests reopening the stations at Chatburn, Rimington, Gisburn and Newsholme with a provision for trains from Clitheroe to run southwards to Leeds after arriving at Hellifield, rather than continuing north to Carlisle. A newly introduced passenger service would increase services southwards from Clitheroe to half-hourly as opposed to the current level of one service per hour.

== See also ==
- John Hargreaves Jr
