= Zion Chapel =

Zion Chapel may refer to:

== Buildings ==
- Zion Chapel, Chester, England
- Zion Chapel, East Grinstead, England – now referred to as West Street Baptist Church
- Zion Baptist Chapel, Llanelli, Wales
- Zion Chapel, Newick
- Zion Chapel, Settle, England
- Zion Memorial Chapel (New Hamburg, New York) – now referred to as St. Nicholas-on-the-Hudson (New Hamburg, New York)

== See also ==
- Seion Chapel, Cwmaman, Rhondda Cynon Taf, Wales
- Bryn Seion Chapel, Trecynon, Rhondda Cynon Taf, Wales
- Zionist churches
