= Listed buildings in Long Preston =

Long Preston is a civil parish in the county of North Yorkshire, England. It contains 27 listed buildings that are recorded in the National Heritage List for England. Of these, one is listed at Grade I, the highest of the three grades, and the others are at Grade II, the lowest grade. The parish contains the village of Long Preston and the surrounding countryside. Most of the listed buildings are houses, cottages and associated structures, farmhouses and farm buildings. The others include a church and items in the churchyard, a bridge, a public house, a former chapel, a boundary stone, a drinking fountain and two milestones.

== Key ==
Grade	Criteria
I	Buildings of exceptional interest, sometimes considered to be internationally important
II	Buildings of national importance and special interest

== Buildings ==
Name and location	Photograph	Date	Notes	Grade
St Mary's Church; 54.01855°N 2.25007°W		Late 14th to early 15th century	The church has been altered and enlarged through the centuries, including a restoration in 1867–68. It is built in stone, with millstone grit dressings, and a stone slate roof. It consists of a nave, north and south aisles, a south porch, a chancel, north and south chapels, and a west tower. The tower has three stages, diagonal buttresses, a clock face on the west, two-light bell openings, and crocketed corner finials. The porch is gabled, and has a moulded entrance surround, a segmental pointed arch, a hood mould and a trefoil cross on the apex.	I
Cromwell House; 54.02295°N 2.26181°W	—	16th century	The house, which has been altered, is in stone, with gritstone dressings, gutters with paired modillions, a blue slate roof at the front and in stone slate at the rear, with coped gables and shaped kneelers. There are two storeys, a double depth plan, and three bays. The doorway has moulded jambs, and a decorated lintel containing a plaque with a moulded surround inscribed with initials and the date, and decorated with scrolls. The windows are top-hung casements.	II
36 Main Street; 54.02084°N 2.25776°W	—	17th century	The house is in gritstone, rendered at the rear, with quoins on the left, and a stone slate roof, the left gable raised, coped and with shaped kneelers. There are two storeys, two bays, and a continuous rear outshut. On the front is a doorway and three-light casement windows.	II
Townhead Farmhouse; 54.02327°N 2.26131°W	—	17th century	The farmhouse is in stone with a stone slate roof. There are two storeys and three bays, and a single-bay extension to the left. The central doorway has a chamfered surround. Most of the windows are mullioned, and in the upper floor are sash windows.	II
Stone shaft 54.01841°N 2.25005°W		1667	The shaft in the churchyard of St Mary's Church, to the south of the church, was originally part of a cross or a sundial. It is in millstone grit, and is about 1.3 metres (4 ft 3 in) high. It consists of an octagonal shaft on a rectangular base, with chamfered corners, and is inscribed on all sides. On the top is a gnomon.	II
3 and 4 Back Green; 54.01875°N 2.25590°W	—	Late 17th century	A house, later divided into two cottages, in stone with a stone slate roof. There are two storeys and an L-shaped plan, with three bays, the right bay recessed. In the right bay is a doorway with a chamfered surround and a massive slate hood on corbels, with two niches to the left and a small recess above. The windows are a mix, and include sashes, casements and former mullioned windows.	II
Headstone; 54.01848°N 2.24986°W	—	Late 17th century	The headstone is in the churchyard of St Mary's Church, to the south of the church. It is in millstone grit, and carries an inscription.	II
Nook and Bronte Cottages; 54.01983°N 2.25681°W	—	1707	A house later divided into two cottages, in stone with a stone slate roof. There are two storeys and three bays. The left doorway has a chamfered surround, and a decorated, dated and inscribed lintel, and the right doorway has a plain surround. In the ground floor are two mullioned windows and a former fire window with a chamfered surround, and above them is a hood mould. The upper floor contains two casement windows and one sash window.	II
Guys Villa Barn; 54.02109°N 2.25983°W	—	1708	A threshing barn in stone with quoins and a stone slate roof. There is a single storey, in the centre is a large cart opening, and the other openings include a stable door and a window. In the recessed wing to the right is an upper loft doorway.	II
Glen Royd; 54.01867°N 2.25326°W	{	1728	The house is in stone on a plinth, with quoins, a string course, a projecting eaves cornice, and a slate roof with gable coping. There are two storeys and three bays. The central doorway has a moulded surround, and the windows are sashes. In both gables is an oculus with keystones.	II
Howe Cottage and 6 Maypole Green; 54.02019°N 2.25453°W	—	Early to mid 18th century	A cottage, later divided into two, in stone with a stone slate roof. There are two storeys and two bays. In the centre are paired doorways with plain surrounds, and the windows are mullioned, with two lights in the ground floor, and three lights and moulded surrounds in the upper floor.	II
Johnson's Bend Gate Farmhouse; 54.00949°N 2.24501°W	—	Mid 18th century	The farmhouse, which retains some earlier features, is in stone and has a stone slate roof with gable coping and shaped kneelers. There are two storeys and three bays. The doorway has a plain surround and a gabled slate hood. Most of the windows are mullioned, with some mullions missing, and at the rear is a round-headed stair window with a keystone.	II
Moorland View; 54.02074°N 2.25839°W	—	Mid 18th century	Two cottages combined into one house, it is rendered, and has painted stone dressings, quoins, and a slate roof. There are two storeys and two bays, and to the right is a lower single-bay extension. In the main block is a doorway with a moulded surround and a rectangular fanlight, and sash windows with moulded surrounds. In the extension is a doorway and fixed-light windows.	II
Byland Cottage, Rivendale, Hill Dene and another cottage 54.01845°N 2.25343°W		Mid to late 18th century	A row of six, later four, cottages in stone, one rendered, with painted stone dressings and a stone slate roof. There are two storeys and eleven bays. On the front are six doorways with plain surrounds, and most of the windows are mullioned with two lights.	II
Table tomb 54.01842°N 2.24948°W	—	1767	The table tomb in the churchyard of St Mary's Church, to the southeast of the church, is in sandstone, and is to the memory of Stephen Smith. It consists of four Tuscan pillars about 1 metre (3 ft 3 in) high carrying a stone slab about 1 metre (3 ft 3 in) by 2 metres (6 ft 7 in).	II
New House; 54.01707°N 2.23800°W	—	1771	A farmhouse in stone that has a stone slate roof with gable coping and shaped kneelers. The rear faces the street, the garden front has two storeys and two bays, and there is a later single-bay extension on the left. The central doorway has a plain surround and a fanlight, and above it is an initialled datestone. The windows on the front are casements, and at the rear are horizontally-sliding sash windows, and a central round-headed stair window with a projecting keystone.	II
Cow Bridge; 54.00850°N 2.26485°W		Late 18th century (probable)	The bridge carries the B6478 road over the River Ribble. It is in stone, and consists of a single segmental arch over the river, and three smaller flanking segmental arches on each side. Between the arches are pilasters, above them is a string course, and the parapet is raked.	II
Maypole Inn; 54.01995°N 2.25529°W		Late 18th century	The public house is rendered, with painted stone dressings, quoins, and a stone slate roof with gable coping and shaped kneelers. There are two storeys and three bays. On the front is a porch with Tuscan pilasters, and the windows are tripartite and mullioned with moulded surrounds.	II
Townhead House; 54.02353°N 2.26094°W	—	Late 18th century	The house is rendered, with painted stone dressings, a string course, a cornice on the middle bay, moulded eaves modillions to the outer bays, and a slate roof with gable coping and kneelers. There are two storeys and three bays, the middle bay projecting as a flattened bow. In the middle bay is a doorway with a fanlight. The windows on the front are sashes, and at the rear are remains of earlier mullioned windows.	II
The Riddings; 54.03511°N 2.27261°W	—	1786	A farmhouse, later a private house, in stone, with chamfered quoins, a floor band, a moulded eaves cornice, and a stone slate roof with gable coping. There are two storeys and three bays. The central doorway has Roman Doric pilasters, a round-headed fanlight, an entablature, and an open pediment. The ground floor windows have been converted into French windows, and in the upper floor are casement windows. At the rear is a doorway with a chamfered surround, and a decorated initialled and dated lintel, in a porch.	II
Anvil House; 54.01875°N 2.25356°W	—	1797	A smithy, later converted into a cottage, it is rendered, with painted stone dressings and a tile roof. There are two storeys and two bays. In the centre is a gabled porch, the windows are mullioned and contain casements. Above the porch is a datestone.	II
Garage; 54.01884°N 2.25063°W		1819	A chapel converted into a garage, it is in stone with a slate roof. There is a single storey and three bays, and the gable end faces the street. On the front is a blocked entrance on the left, two round-headed windows, and to the right is a wagon entrance replacing the third window.	II
Boundary Stone; 54.00953°N 2.24522°W		Early 19th century	The parish boundary stone is on the east side of the A682 road. It consists of a painted stone slab about 70 centimetres (28 in) high, and has a segmental pointed top. The stone is inscribed with "Long Preston" and "Hellifield" separated by a vertical scored line.	II
Drinking fountain 54.01963°N 2.25528°W		1869	The drinking fountain is in sandstone, and has a raked plinth, a square base and a trough. Four chamfered pillars support four shouldered lintels with paterae, and it is surmounted by a pyramidal roof. On the base is an inscribed and dated panel.	II
Ash Lea; 54.02118°N 2.25964°W	—	Late 19th century	The house, with earlier origins, is in stone with a stone slate roof, two storeys and two bays. On the front are two blocked doorways, one with an inserted window, and sash windows. The entrance is in the right gable end, and at the rear are three-light mullioned windows.	II
Milestone, West End; 54.02261°N 2.26155°W		c. 1895	The milepost is on the northeast side of the A65 road. It is in gritstone with a cast iron plate, and has a triangular plan and a rounded top. On the top is inscribed "KEIGHLEY AND KENDAL ROAD" and "LONG PRESTON", on the left side are the distances to Skipton and Keighley, and on the right side to Settle and Kendal.	II
Milestone near Skir Beck Farm; 54.03164°N 2.28077°W		c. 1895	The milepost is on the northeast side of the A65 road. It is in gritstone with a cast iron plate, and has a triangular plan and a rounded top. On the top is inscribed "KEIGHLEY AND KENDAL ROAD" and "LONG PRESTON", on the left side are the distances to Skipton and Keighley, and on the right side to Settle and Kendal.	II
