= Holy Ascension Church, Settle =

Church in Settle, North Yorkshire, England

Coordinates: 54.0705°N 2.2773°W

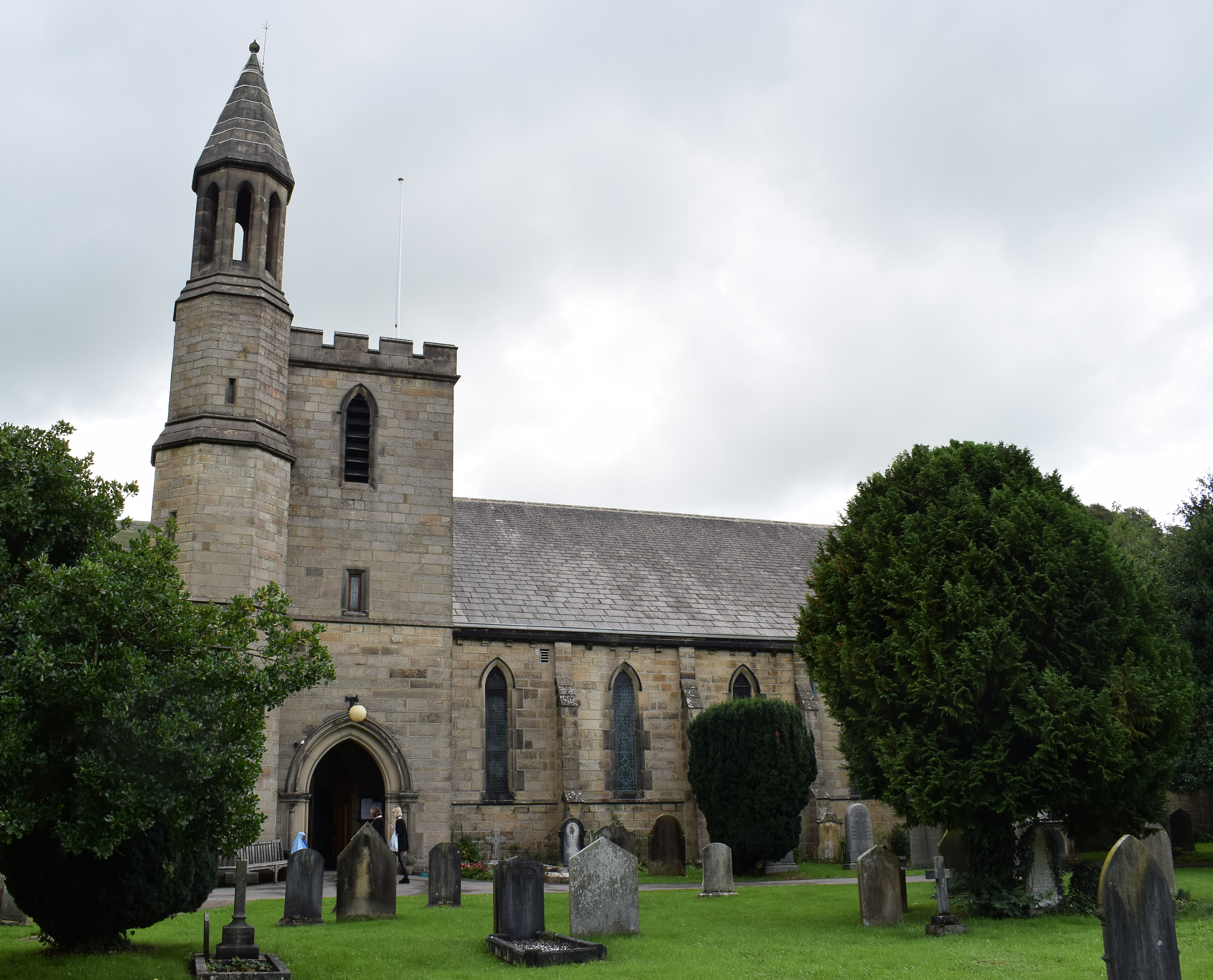
The church, in 2018

Holy Ascension Church is the parish church of Settle, North Yorkshire, a town in England.

Settle was long in the parish of St Alkelda's Church, Giggleswick. The town's own church was built between 1836 and 1838. It is in the Early English style, and was designed by Thomas Rickman. A small extension was later added, as a boiler house. The building was grade II listed in 1988.

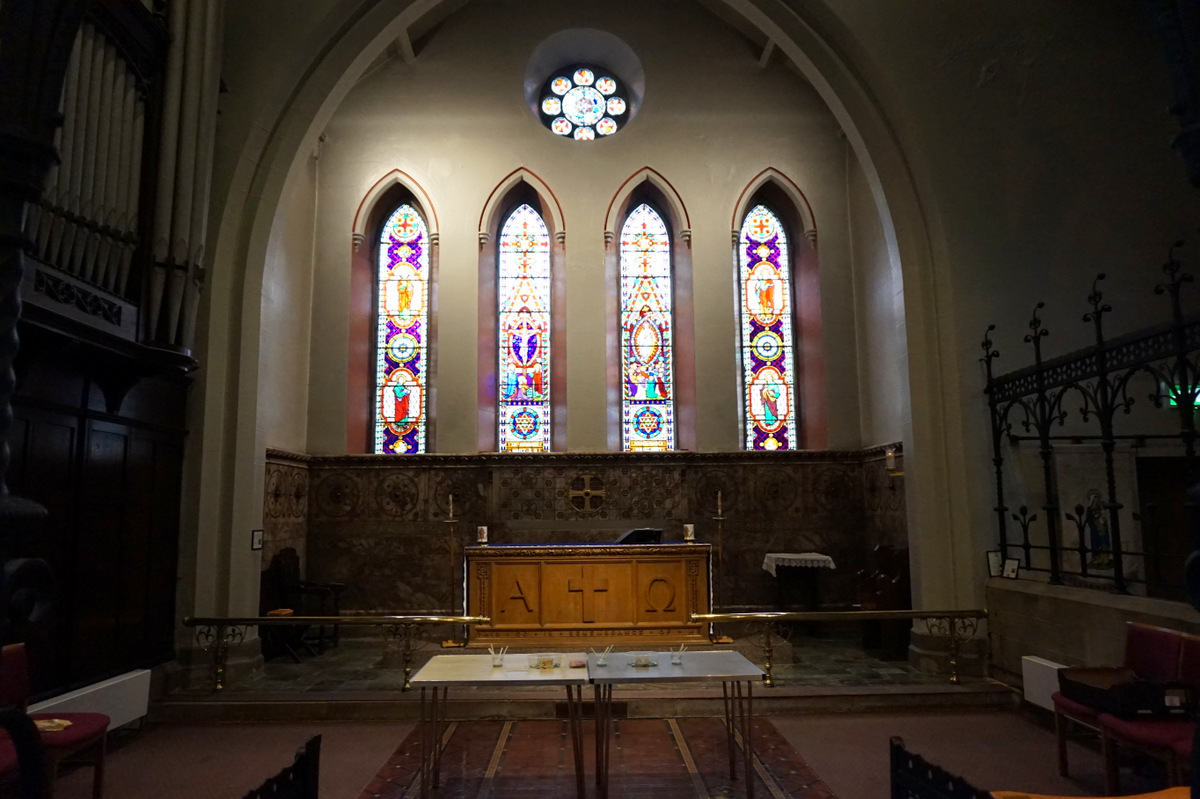
The chancel

The church is built of stone with a slate roof. It consists of nave, a chancel with a rectangular apse and a chapel, and a south tower. The tower has three stages, and contains a porch with an arched entrance, and engaged columns with crocket capitals. Above is a rectangular window, a bell opening with a pointed arch, and an embattled parapet. Attached to it is a four-stage octagonal bell turret rising higher than the tower, with eight hexagonal pillars, a spirelet and a ball finial. The windows on the body of the church are lancets. The west window has stained glass by Edward Burne-Jones. In the porch is a marble tablet, commemorating workers who died building the Midland Railway's Settle to Carlisle line. Inside are a marble font and pulpit dating from 1867, and an iron chancel screen of similar date. There is a south gallery, on which is the coat of arms of Queen Victoria.

== See also ==
- Listed buildings in Settle, North Yorkshire
