= The Shambles, Settle =

Building in Settle, North Yorkshire, England

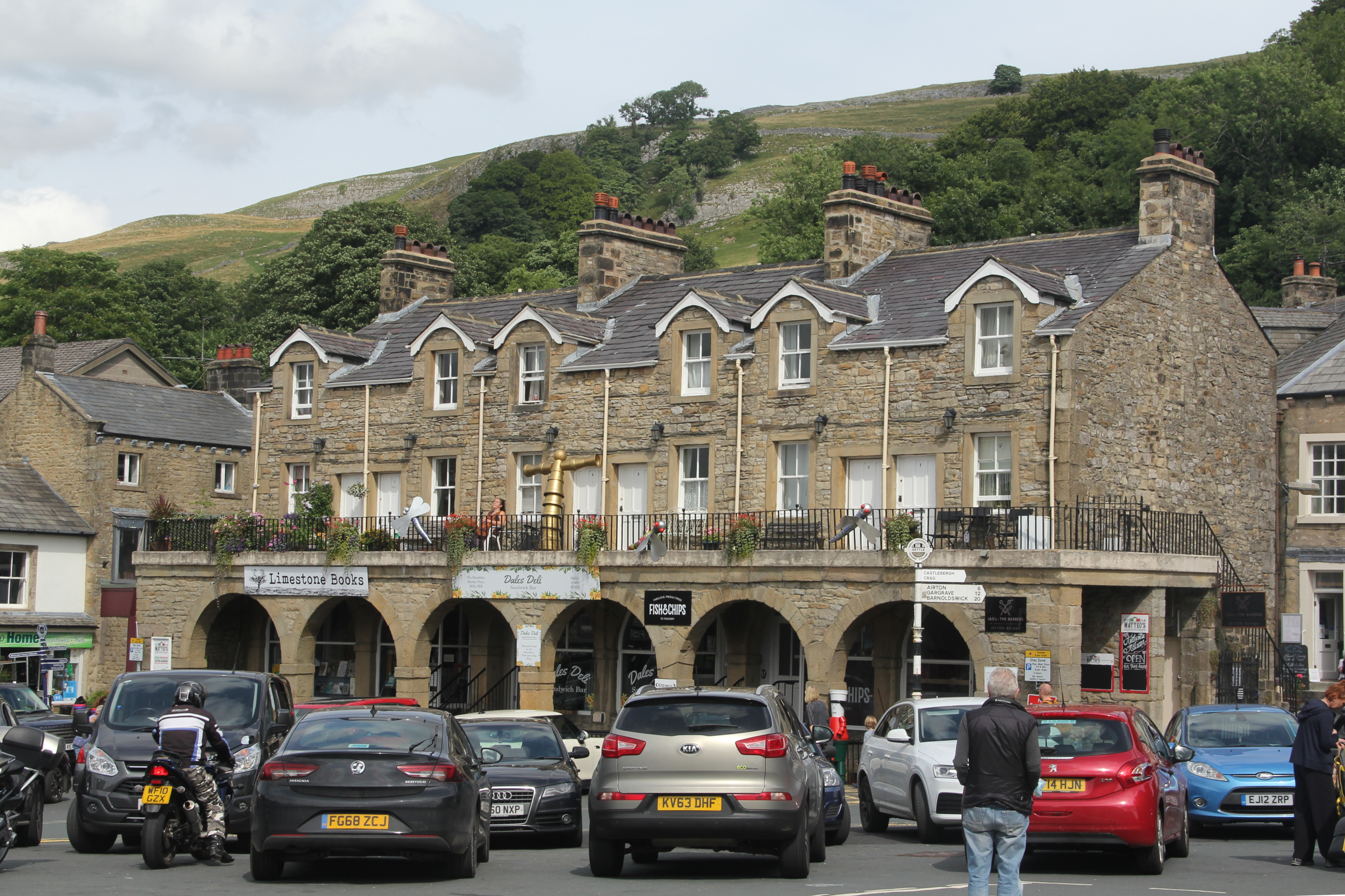
The building, in 2021

The Shambles is a historic building in Settle, North Yorkshire, a town in England.

The building was constructed around 1700 as a market hall, with a terrace of single-storey cottages on top. The building was refurbished in the late 1880s, then in 1898, the cottages were altered with the addition of a second storey. In the 20th century, shop fronts were inserted to enclosed the ground floor, and steps were added to provide access to them, replacing earlier steps at the gable ends. The building was grade II listed in 1988.

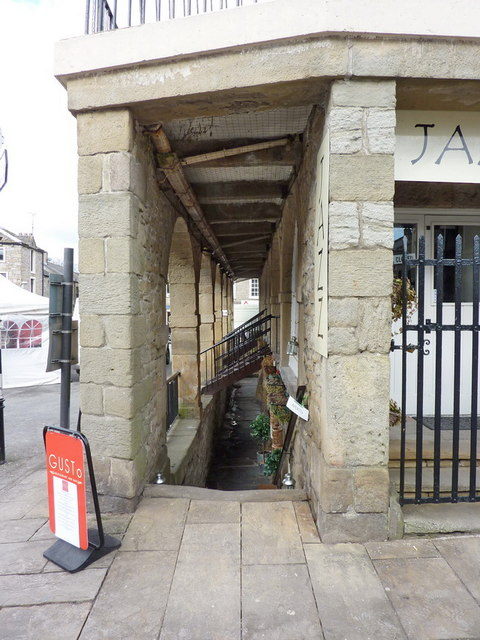
Side view, showing the passageway and stairs across it

The building consists of a loggia with shops behind, surmounted by cottages. The loggia is in stone, and consists of six round-headed arches, behind which are six more arches acting as shopfronts, the shops with cellars. Above is a row of six cottages in stone with slate roofs. These have two storeys, and each cottage has one bay. They are in pairs, with paired doorways and a window in each floor, the upper window in a half-dormer with a gable.

== See also ==
- Listed buildings in Settle, North Yorkshire
