= Cow Bridge =

Bridge in Long Preston, North Yorkshire, England

Coordinates: 54°00′30.6″N 2°15′53.5″W

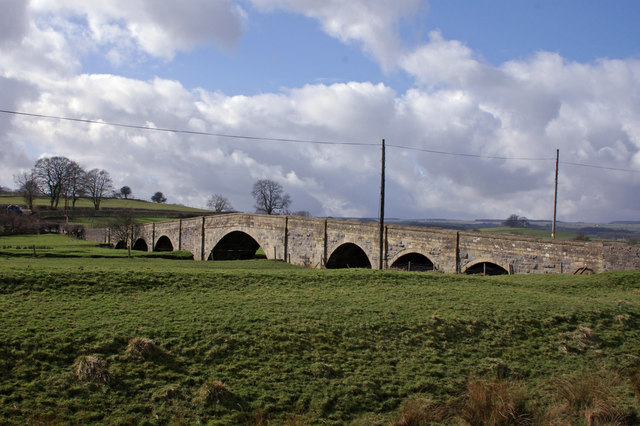
The bridge, in 2007

Cow Bridge is a historic bridge in Long Preston, a village in North Yorkshire, in England.

The bridge crosses the River Ribble, carrying the B6478 road and the Pennine Bridleway. A bridge on the site was first recorded in 1639, when it was reported as being ruinous, and it was again reported as being in poor condition in 1752. The current bridge is probably late 18th century, while the parapet was rebuilt in the 19th century. It was grade II listed in 1987.

It is in stone, and consists of a single segmental arch over the river, and three smaller flanking segmental arches on each side. Between the arches are pilasters, above them is a string course, and the parapet is raked. There are many mason's marks and other symbols carved into the stones.

== See also ==
- Listed buildings in Long Preston
