= The Folly, Settle =

Building in Settle, North Yorkshire, England

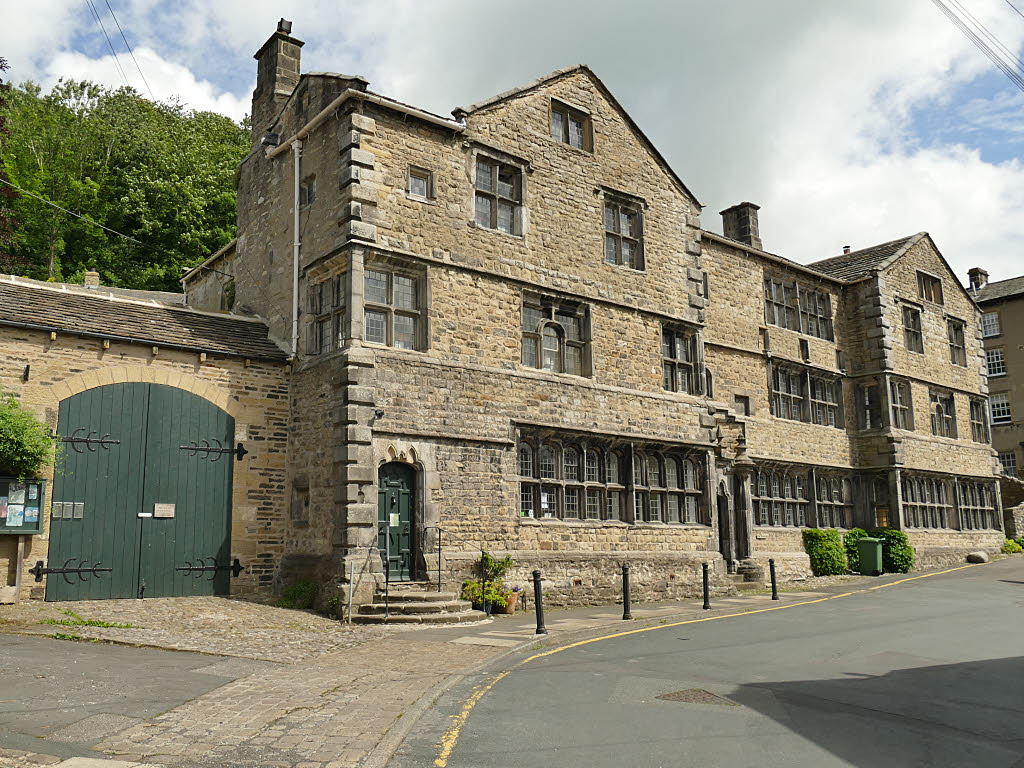
The building, in 2020

The Folly is a historic building in Settle, North Yorkshire, a town in England. It houses the Museum of North Craven Life. The museum focuses on the history of the local region and the people who have lived there.

== History ==
The house was constructed in 1670 as the home of Richard Preston, a local lawyer. In the early 18th century, it was sold to William Dawson, and it remained in the family for many years, let out and subdivided into apartments and space for businesses. In the mid 19th century, it housed a bakery, while later activities included a tearoom, a fish and chip shop, a potato wholesaler, a furniture shop, a bank, and a salvage business. It was restored in the 1970s and then sold by the Dawson family to an antiques dealer. In the 1990s, it was divided into two properties, one of which was bought by the North Craven Building Preservation Trust and opened as a museum in 2001. In 2010, it purchased the other half of the building, reuniting it.

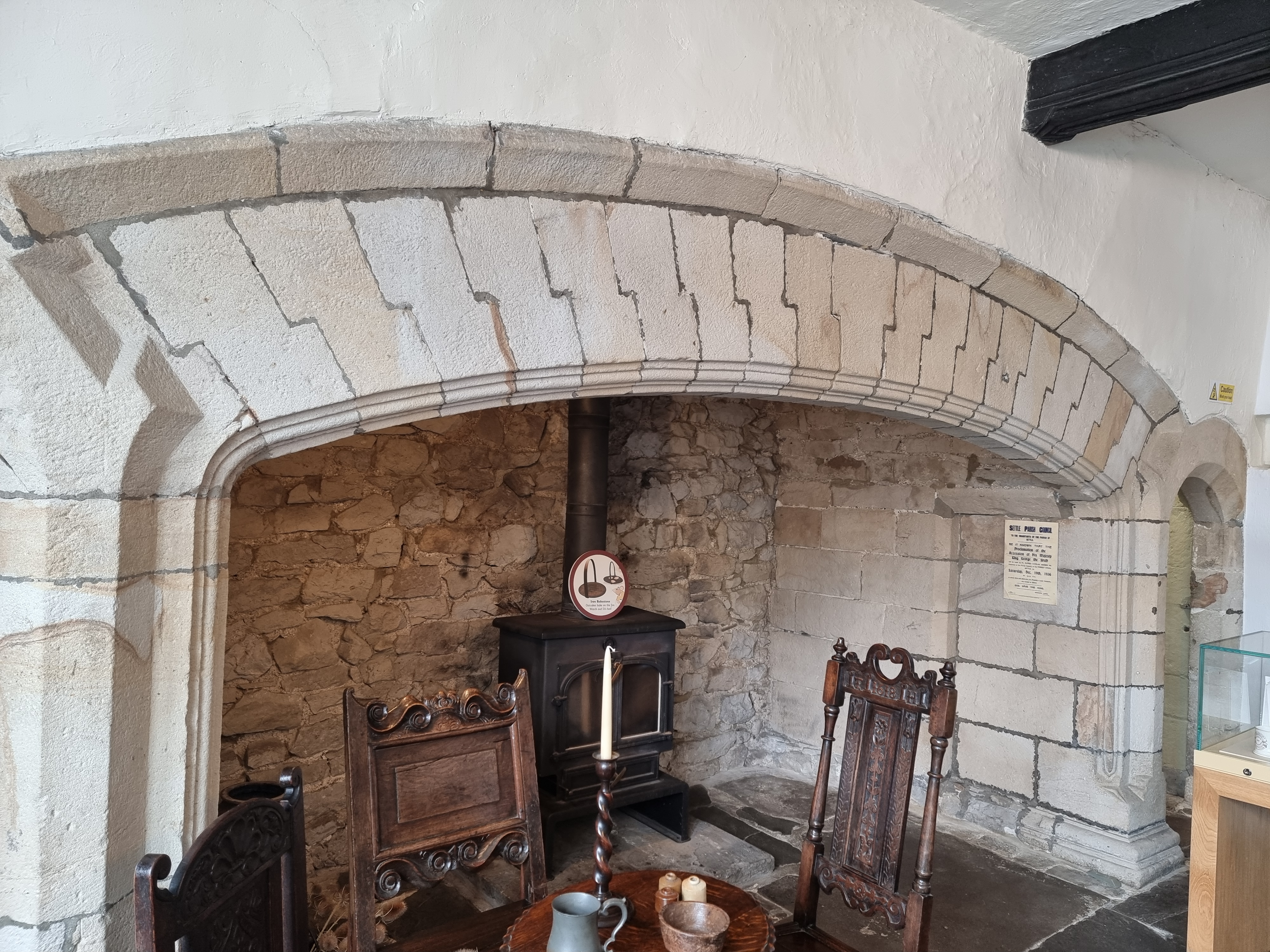
One of the inglenook fireplaces

The building has been grade I listed since 1958. It is constructed of stone, with quoins and a stone slate roof. There are three storeys, a central range and projecting gabled cross-wings. The doorway in the central range has an ornate surround, and is flanked by columns with panelled flutes, moulded capitals and finials. Above is a massive decorated lintel and a finial. On the left wing is a less ornate doorway, also with a decorated lintel. Most of the windows are mullioned and transomed, and on the ground floor they are almost continuous, extending round the right corner, and with a continuous hood mould. Inside, there is a panelled hall with an inglenook fireplace, an early staircase in the hall, and a further room with another inglenook fireplace.

== See also ==
- Grade I listed buildings in North Yorkshire (district)
- Listed buildings in Settle, North Yorkshire
