= Settle Town Hall =

Municipal building in Settle, North Yorkshire, England

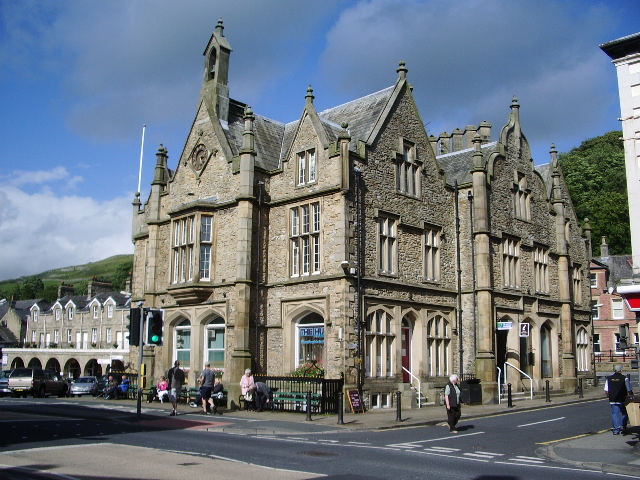
- Settle Town Hall

- Shown in North Yorkshire
- 54.0685°N 2.2768°W
- Location: Cheapside, Settle

History
- Built: 1832

Site notes
- Architect: George Webster
- Architectural style: Gothic Revival style

Listed Building – Grade II
- Official name: Town Hall
- Designated: 13 September 1988
- Reference no.: 1132346

Settle Town Hall is a municipal building in Cheapside in Settle, North Yorkshire, England. The structure, which was the meeting place of Settle Rural District Council, is a Grade II listed building.

== History ==
The town hall was commissioned by a group of private shareholders: it was designed by George Webster in the Gothic Revival style, built in rubble masonry at a cost of £5,500 and was completed in 1832. The design involved a symmetrical main frontage with six bays facing south onto Cheapside; the central section of two bays bay, which slightly projected forward, featured three openings on the ground floor with a central date stone above inscribed with the words "erected 1832". There were two three-light windows on the first floor and a single three-light window on the second floor. All three sections were gabled. The western elevation featured a prominent oriel window on the first floor and a clock in the gable above, while the northern elevation featured an oriel window in the right hand section. Internally, the principal rooms were a courtroom, an assembly room and a library.

After significant population growth, largely associated with Settle's status as a market town, the area became a rural district with the town hall as its headquarters in 1894. The town hall continued to serve as the headquarters of Settle Rural District Council for much of the 20th century but ceased to be local seat of government when the enlarged Craven District Council which was formed in 1974. In June 1981 a protest group, the Friends of the Settle–Carlisle Line, held its inaugural meeting at the town hall and campaigned against the closure of the Settle–Carlisle line even before it was officially announced.

A shop known as "Pet, Garden and Farm Supplies" was established in the building in 1983 and the local tourist information office also moved in. After concerns were raised over the high cost of maintenance, Craven District Council disposed of the building to a developer, Marshall Taylor Properties, in October 2011. The developer completed a programme of works, which involved converting the building into a mixed-use property with residential apartments, retail units and offices, in 2016. The clock on the west elevation was refurbished with funding from Marshall Taylor Properties and Settle Town Council in October 2020.

== See also ==
- Listed buildings in Settle, North Yorkshire
