= King's Mill, Settle =

Building in Settle, North Yorkshire, England

Coordinates: 54°04′13″N 2°17′07″W

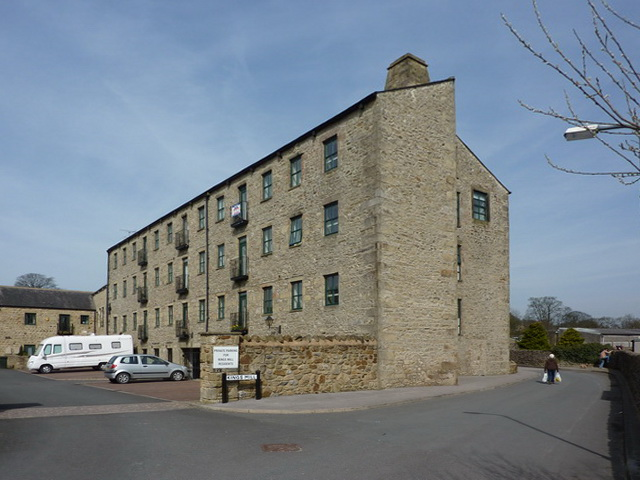
The building, in 2010

The King's Mill is a historic building in Settle, North Yorkshire, a town in England.

The building was constructed by John Procter in about 1830 as a cotton mill. In the late 19th century, it was extended to the left. The mill was divided in two during the early 20th century, then in 1945 was reunited under the ownership of Langcliffe Paper Mills. They used the mill to manufacture cards for Jacquard machines. Production ended in 1980, after which the building was used by the company for storage. In 1996, they sold the mill for conversion into housing.

The mill has been grade II listed since 1988. It is built of stone with eaves modillions, and a stone slate roof. It has four storeys, and is 13 bays wide. It contains doorways, windows and former loading doors.

== See also ==
- Listed buildings in Settle, North Yorkshire
