= Settle College =

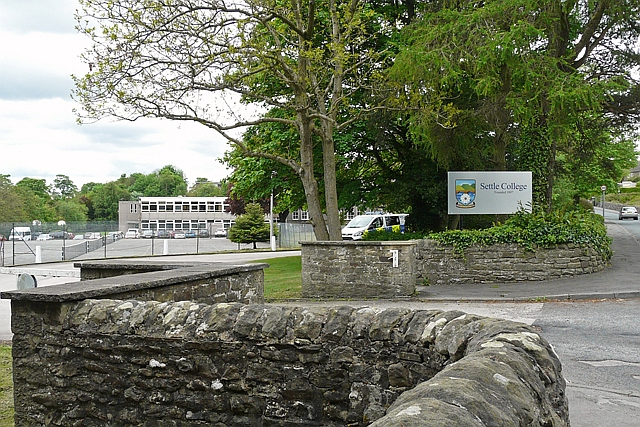
- Entrance of the school in 2017.

Location
- Kendal Road; Settle, North Yorkshire, BD24 0AU; England; 54.0721°N 2.2852°W

Information
- Former names: Settle High School; Settle Girls' High School
- Type: Community school
- Motto: Be the best you can be / Veritas Virtus Libertas (Truth, Courage, Freedom)
- Established: 1907
- Local authority: North Yorkshire Council
- Department for Education URN: 121689 Tables
- Ofsted: Reports
- Head teacher: Gareth Whitaker
- Gender: Mixed
- Age range: 11–18
- Enrolment: 593 (2019)
- Capacity: 694
- Colours: Navy and Gold
- Website: www.settlecollege.org.uk

Settle College (formerly Settle High School and Settle Girls' High School) is an 11–18 mixed, community secondary school and sixth form in Settle, North Yorkshire, England. It was established in 1907.

It is a partner in 'The Three Peaks Family of Schools', a grouping of primary, middle and secondary schools in North Craven.

== History ==
Settle College links back to the Settle Girls' High School, founded in 1907, which became the comprehensive Settle High School in 1959. It changed its name to Settle College in 2004 when the school gained Technology College status.

== Notable alumni ==
- John Newman, musician, singer, songwriter and record producer
- Tom Windle, footballer
- Richard Howson, businessman
- Emma Lonsdale, freestyle skier
- Susan Brookes, chef

== Notable staff ==
- Anna Adams, art teacher from 1971 to 1974
- Brenda Swinbank, archaeologist and academic, History and Latin mistress from 1952 to 1956
