= Tom Windle =

English footballer

Personal information
- Full name: Thomas Jack Windle
- Date of birth: 1998 or 1999 (age 27–28)
- Height: 5 ft 9 in (1.75 m)
- Position: Defender

Team information
- Current team: Florida Tech Panthers

Youth career
- Skipton LMS
- 2010–2016: Bradford City

College career
Years	Team	Apps	(Gls)
2018–2020	Tyler Junior College Apaches		
2021–2022	Florida Tech Panthers	25	(1)

Senior career*
Years	Team	Apps	(Gls)
2016–2017	Bradford City	0	(0)
- * Club domestic league appearances and goals as of 14:15, 4 May 2021 (UTC)

Thomas Jack Windle (born 1998/1999) is an English footballer who plays as a defender.

== Early and personal life ==
Windle attended Water Street Primary School in Skipton and Settle College.

== Career ==
He joined Bradford City at the age of 11, after being spotted playing for local side LMS in Skipton. He made 3 senior appearances for the club in the EFL Trophy during the 2016–17 season. He left the club after seven years, and in 2018 obtained a scholarship for Tyler Junior College. After two years he moved to Florida Institute of Technology.

== Career statistics ==
As of 14 December 2018.

Appearances and goals by club, season and competition
Club	Season	League		FA Cup		League Cup		Other		Total	
Club	Season	Apps	Goals	Apps	Goals	Apps	Goals	Apps	Goals	Apps	Goals
Bradford City	2016–17	0	0	0	0	0	0	3	0	3	0
Career total		0	0	0	0	0	0	3	0	3	0
