= Norman Adams (British artist) =

British artist

Norman Edward Albert Adams RA
- Born: 9 February 1927
- Died: 9 March 2005 (aged 78)
- Known for: Painting

Norman Edward Albert Adams RA (9 February 1927 – 9 March 2005) was a British artist, and professor of painting at the Royal Academy Schools.

He was married to the English poet and artist Anna Adams (1926–2011).
