= Anna Adams (poet) =

English poet and artist

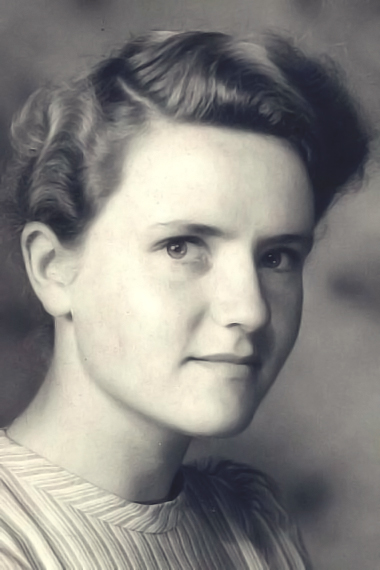
- Born: Anna Theresa Butt; 9 March 1926; Richmond, Surrey, England
- Died: 2 October 2011 (aged 85)
- Education: Harrow School of Art; Hornsey College of Art
- Occupations: Author, poet, artist
- Partner: Norman Adams

Anna Adams (9 March 1926 – 2 October 2011) was an English poet and artist.

== Biography ==
Anna Adams was born Anna Theresa Butt on 9 March 1926, at Richmond, Surrey. When she was two years old, her family relocated to Northwood, a town fifteen miles northwest of London. She was the youngest of three children. Her father was a journalist. During the First World War he had been a conscientious objector.

At the age of thirteen, Adams won a scholarship to Harrow School of Art, where she obtained the National Diploma in Design (NDiD) in painting in 1945. At Harrow she met her future husband, the painter Norman Adams. They married on January 18, 1947. She continued to use her maiden name for her art work. She then studied sculpture at Hornsey College of Art, exhibiting in the Young Contemporaries show in London. There she completed her second NDD. After college she took a job as a part-time teacher. She held a number of jobs related to her arts training. She was a designer at Chelsea Pottery (1953-1955), a part-time art teacher in Manchester (1966-1970), and an art teacher at Settle College secondary school (1971-1974).

She had always shown an interest in writing, and by 1961, Adams had begun to write seriously in both prose and verse. Her first poem was printed in 1969. Peterloo Press published her first book, A Reply to Intercepted Mail, in 1979 as part of its Peterloo Poets series. She had already published several small pamphlets, or chapbooks, and she continued to produce various shorter publications throughout her career. In all, she published about twenty books and pamphlets. Many of her poems appeared in newspapers, magazines, and literary journals, including Poetry Review, P. N. Review, The Countryman, 10th Muse, Western Mail, Poetry Durham, Poetry Canada, Encounter, Orbis, The Spectator, The North, and Yorkshire Journal. Adams's honors included several first prizes in the Yorkshire Poets competition and the 1976 Arnold Vincent Bowen Prize.

Adams was poetry editor of The Green Book from 1989 to 1992. She was a member of the Poetry Society and the Piccadilly Poets Committee.

== Bibliography ==
=== Poetry ===
- A Journey Through Winter and Other Poems (Manchester Institute of Contemporary Art 1969)
- Rainbow Plantation (1971)
- Memorial Tree (1972)
- Parabola (Headland Publications 1975)
- Unchanging Seas (Headland Publications 1978)
- A Reply to Intercepted Mail (Peterloo Poets 1979)
- An Island Chapter (Littlewood Press 1983)
- Brother Fox and Other Relatives (MidNAG Publications 1983)
- Dear Vincent (Littlewood-Arc Press 1986)
- Trees in Sheep Country (Peterloo Poets 1986)
- Six Legs Good (Mandeville Press 1987)
- Angels in Soho (The Royal Academy 1988)
- Nobodies (Peterloo Poets 1990)
- Island Chapters (poems and prose; Norman Adams, Illustrator) (Littlewood-Arc Press 1991)
- Life on Limestone: A Year in the Yorkshire Dales (poems and prose; Norman Adams, Illustrator) (Dalesman Publishing Co Ltd 1994)
- Green Resistance (Enitharmon Press 1996)
- A Paper Ark (Peterloo Poets 1996)
- Flying Underwater (Peterloo Poets 2004)
- Time Pockets (Fisherrow Press 2011)
- Open Doors: Selected Poems, John Killick, ed. (Shoestring Press 2014)

=== Anthologies ===
- Bread and Roses: Women's Poetry of the 19th and 20th Centuries, Diana Scott, ed. (Virago Press 1982)
- Thames: An Anthology of River Poems, Editor (Enitharmon Press 1999)
- London in Prose and Verse, Editor (Enitharmon Press 2003)
- Poems from the Old Hill: A Lewes Anthology, Jeremy Page, ed. (Frogmore Press 2012)

=== Selected criticism ===
- Killick, John. "‘Promiscuous Empathy’: A Brief Guide To The Poetry Of Anna Adams." The North 37 (Nov 2005).
- Darragh, Simon. "An Accessible Nature" (review of Flying Underwater). London Magazine (Oct 2005).

=== Selected interviews ===
- Anna Adams, "Craft Interview." New York Quarterly 58 (2002).
- Melanie Roberts, Interviewer. National Life Stories, Artists' Lives: Norman Adams (with Anna Adams). (British Library, Oral History 2000). 220 p.

=== Awards ===
- First Prize, Yorkshire Poets (1974, 1976, 1977)
- Arnold Vincent Bowen Prize (1976)
- First Prize, Lincoln Open (1984)
- First Prize, Rhyme International (1986)
- Second Prize, Cardiff Festival Poetry Competition (1987)
