= Settle Victoria Hall =

Music hall in North Yorkshire, England

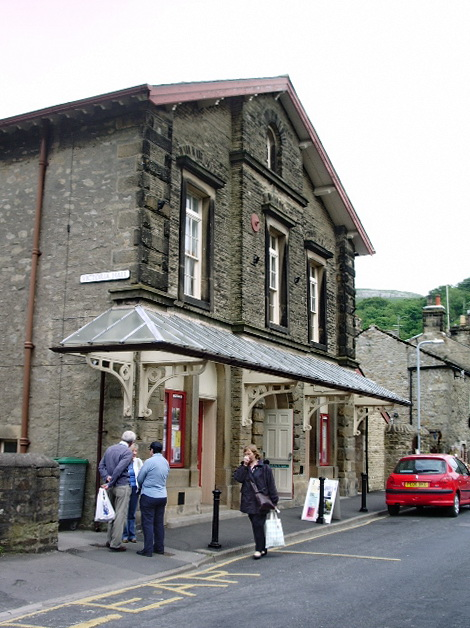
- Settle Victoria Hall

- Location within North Yorkshire

General information
- Type: Concert hall
- Location: Kirkgate, Settle, North Yorkshire, England
- Coordinates: 54.0687°N 2.2790°W
- Current tenants: Settle Victoria Hall
- Completed: 1853
- Inaugurated: 11 October 1853
- Renovated: 2000
- Owner: Craven District Council

Design and construction
- Architect: Edward Graham Paley
- Architecture firm: Sharpe and Paley

Website
- Settle Victoria Hall

Listed Building – Grade II
- Official name: The Victoria Hall
- Designated: 20 November 2001
- Reference no.: 1389509

Settle Victoria Hall is a Grade II listed concert hall in Kirkgate, Settle, North Yorkshire, England. It is the UK's oldest surviving music hall.

Built in about 1852, and designed by Sharpe and Paley, it opened as Settle Music Hall on 11 October 1853. It was the brainchild of local philanthropist Rev. James Robinson, an active member of Settle Choral Society, who proposed that "the building should be such as to answer all the purposes of public instruction and entertainment". Early shows at Settle Music Hall included recitals of classical music, educational lectures and classes, and popular entertainments. It was renamed "The Victoria Hall" around November 1892. From 1919 until 1939, Victoria Hall also operated as a cinema, initially as "The Picturedrome" and later as the "Kirkgate Kinema". In 1921, the building was bequeathed by the Robinson family to Craven District Council.

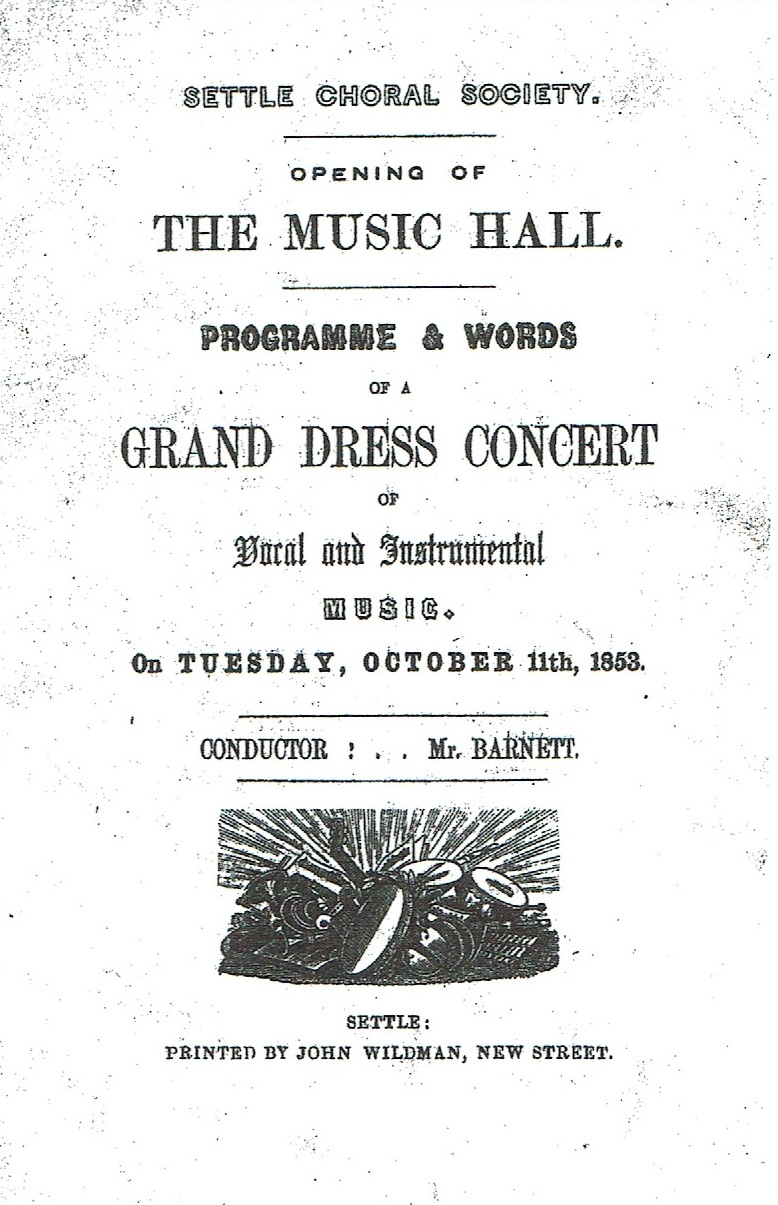
Programme from the opening of The Music Hall, Settle, 11 October 1853

Settle Victoria Hall was restored in 2000, under the management of the newly formed Settle Victoria Hall Ltd, a charity, which was established in 1999 and presents a wide programme of drama, comedy, film, and music as well as community events, workshops, and indoor markets. The building is now owned by North Yorkshire Council, which has taken over the local governance functions of Craven District Council.

== See also ==
- Listed buildings in Settle, North Yorkshire
