= Zion Chapel, Settle =

Chapel in Settle, North Yorkshire, England

Coordinates: 54.0673°N 2.2746°W

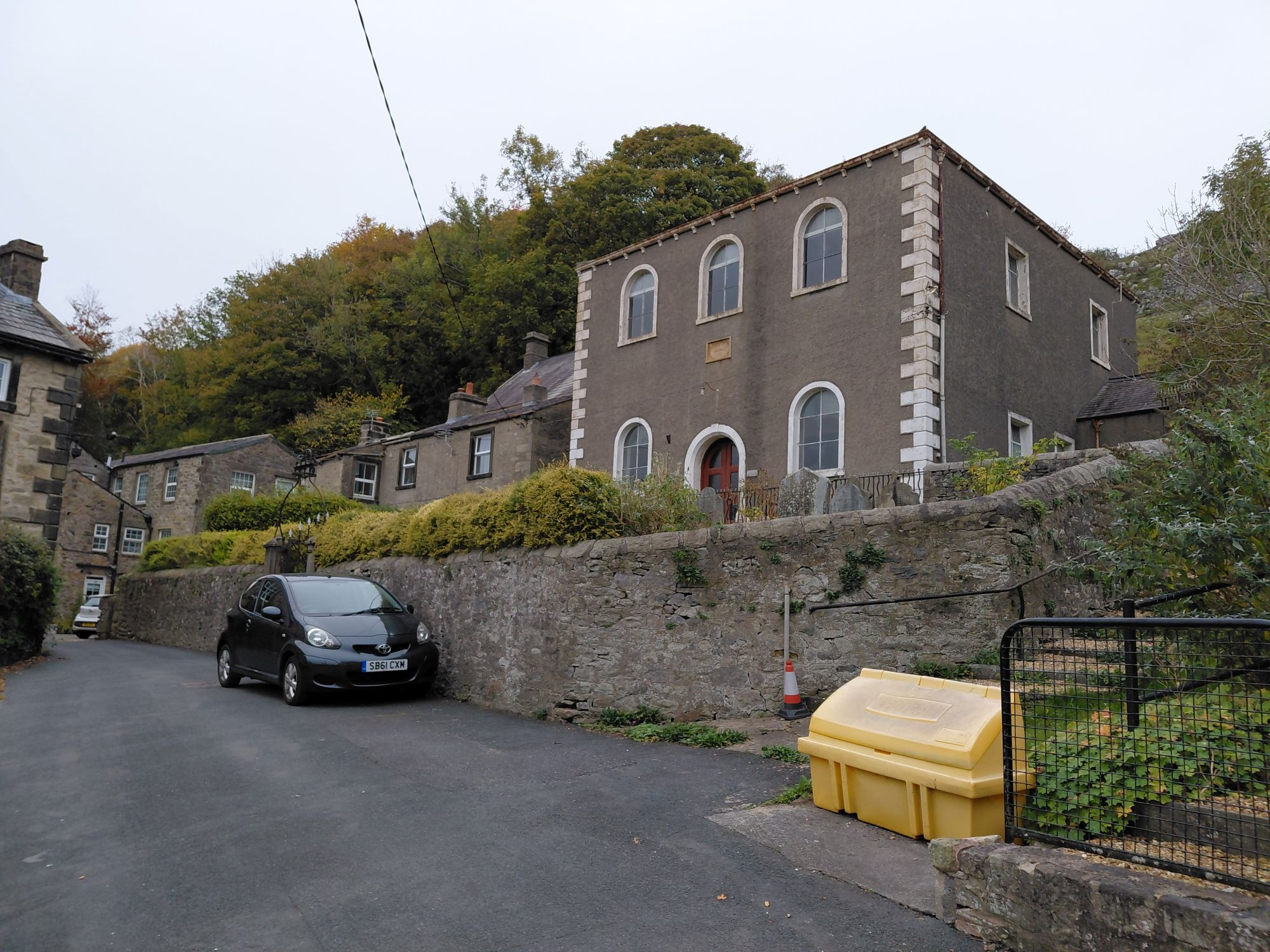
The building, in 2025

Zion Chapel is a closed church in Settle, North Yorkshire, a town in England.

The Itinerary Society began preaching in Settle in 1813, drawing crowds of up to 1,000. They partly funded the construction of a chapel in Upper Settle, which was completed in 1816. Standing high on a hillside, it was named for the Biblical Mount Zion. The church was part of the Congregationalist movement, but remained independent. In 1852, its minister, William Jackson, was asked to resign due to neglect of his duties, and unusually the former Anglican vicar of the Church of St Alkelda, Giggleswick was asked to lead worship until a new incumbent was appointed. In the 1870s, the interior was refitted, and a schoolroom was added at the rear. The building was grade II listed in 1988. The chapel closed in 2015, and after permission for conversion to residential use was refused, the trustees donated it to the North Craven Building Preservation Trust.

The former chapel is rendered, with stone dressings, chamfered quoins, modillion eaves, and a hipped slate roof. There are two storeys and three bays, and a single-storey vestry on the right. The central doorway has a round-arched head, a chamfered surround and a keystone, and the windows all have plain surrounds and round-arched heads.

== See also ==
- Listed buildings in Settle, North Yorkshire
