= Listed buildings in Settle, North Yorkshire =

Settle is a civil parish in the county of North Yorkshire, England. It contains 76 listed buildings that are recorded in the National Heritage List for England. Of these, one is listed at Grade I, the highest of the three grades, two are at Grade II*, the middle grade, and the others are at Grade II, the lowest grade. The parish contains the market town of Settle and the surrounding countryside. Most of the listed buildings in the parish are houses, cottages and associated structures, and shops and offices. The others include hotels and public houses, restaurants and cafés, churches and chapels, a milestone and a mile post, a railway station and associated buildings, public buildings, a bridge, farmhouses and farm buildings, a concert hall, a former mill, a war memorial, and two telephone kiosks.

== Key ==
Grade	Criteria
I	Buildings of exceptional interest, sometimes considered to be internationally important
II*	Particularly important buildings of more than special interest
II	Buildings of national importance and special interest

== Buildings ==
Name and location	Photograph	Date	Notes	Grade
2 Albert Hill; 54.06601°N 2.27395°W		17th century	Two cottages, later one house, it was refronted in about 1772, and is in stone with a slate roof. There are two storeys and three bays. In the centre are paired doorways with plain surrounds, and the windows are sashes.	II
3 Albert Hill; 54.06615°N 2.27387°W		17th century	The cottage is in rendered stone with a Welsh slate roof. There are two storeys and two bays. The doorway in the right bay has a plain surround, to its left is a three-light mullioned window, and the upper floor contains modern windows.	II
5 Albert Hill; 54.06613°N 2.27379°W		17th century	The cottage is in stone with a Welsh slate roof. There are two storeys and two bays. The doorway in the left bay has a plain surround, to its right is a three-light mullioned window, and on the upper floor are a single-light window and a two-light mullioned window.	II
Bishopsdale House; 54.06873°N 2.27776°W	—	17th century	The house, later used for other purposes, is in stone, and has a stone slate roof with shaped modillions to the gable. There are three storeys and three bays. The doorway has a chamfered surround, and to the left is a former entrance converted into a window. The windows are mullioned, with some mullions missing, and most with hood moulds.	II
Eiliam; 54.06881°N 2.27638°W	—	17th century	A house and a shop, it was refronted in the 19th century. It is in stone, with eaves modillions and a stone slate roof. There are three storeys, two bays, and a rear wing. The doorway on the left has a plain surround, to its right is a two-light mullioned window, and the upper floors contain casement windows. At the rear is a mullioned window missing its mullion.	II
Fern Cottage; 54.06893°N 2.27629°W	—	17th century	A house, later used for other purposes, in stone, with eaves modillions, and a stone slate roof. There are three storeys and three bays. The ground floor contains a doorway, a two-light window to its left and a single-light window on the right, all with stone surrounds. On the middle floor are sash windows, and the windows on the top floor are casements.	II
Fruit Shop; 54.06824°N 2.27645°W	—	17th century	A cottage, later a shop, in stone with a Welsh slate roof. There are three storeys and three bays. The central doorway has moulded jambs, and a hood with a dentilled frieze, and it is flanked by shop windows. Above the doorway is a loading door, and elsewhere are mullioned windows, some stepped. At the rear is a doorway with an arched head and a chamfered surround.	II
Hadfield Cottage; 54.06720°N 2.27565°W	—	c. 17th century	Formerly a wing of Hadfield House, later a separate cottage, it is in stone with a stone slate roof. There are three storeys and one bay. The doorway is on the left and the windows are mullioned.	II
Keepers Cottage; 54.05413°N 2.27130°W	—	17th century	The cottage is in stone with a stone slate roof. There are two storeys, five bays, and a two-bay rear projection with a slate roof. The doorway has a chamfered surround, and a broad hood consisting of a stone slate slab supported by a corbel on each side of the lintel. The windows are mullioned, with some mullions missing.	II
Mile post 54.05613°N 2.28803°W		17th century	The mile post consists of a square stone post about 1 metre (3 ft 3 in) in height, with a chamfered top. On the sides are the distances to Settle, Skipton and Clitheroe, two sides have pointing hands, and one has flower motifs.	II
Sanderson and Company; 54.06887°N 2.27736°W		17th century	A house, later a café, it is rendered, and has painted stone dressings and a slate roof. There are two storeys and two bays. The ground floor contains a shopfront and a central doorway, and on the upper floor are casement windows.	II
Settle Bridge; 54.07242°N 2.28184°W		17th century (probable)	The bridge carries the B6480 road over the River Ribble, and it was widened in the 18th century. It is in stone and consists of two elliptical arches with four deep ribs on the upstream side of each arch, each rib chamfered at the base, and a cutwater on the upstream side.	II*
Shambles; 54.0688°N 2.27660°W		17th century (probable)	A loggia with shops behind, surmounted by cottages. The loggia is in stone, and consists of six round-headed arches, behind which are six more arches acting as shopfronts, the shops with cellars. Above is a row of six cottages in stone with slate roofs. These have two storeys, and each cottage has one bay. They are in pairs, with paired doorways and a window in each floor, the upper window in a half-dormer with a gable.	II
Woolers, Staffords and Mcloughlins; 54.06712°N 2.27537°W	—	17th century	A row of three houses in stone with a stone slate roof. There are two storeys on the front and three at the rear, and each house has one bay. All the houses have a doorway with a rectangular fanlight, the right two paired. At the rear, the windows have chamfered surround, some are mullioned and some have hood moulds.	II
Cob Castle; 54.06452°N 2.27436°W	—	1663	The house, later divided into two cottages, is in stone with a stone slate roof. The right return has two storeys and four bays. In the centre is a doorway with a plain lintel, and to the left is the original entrance with a chamfered surround and a dated and initialled lintel, now blocked and with an inserted window. The windows on his front are casements, and elsewhere are mullioned windows.	II
Naked Man Café; 54.06881°N 2.27737°W		1663	A house, later a café, it is rendered, with painted stone dressings, and a slate roof. There are two storeys and two bays, The central doorway has moulded jambs and a decorated lintel, and to the left is a shop window. The upper floor contains two-light mullioned windows, and between them is a relief carving of a man holding a dated and initialled plaque.	II
Primrose House and The Cottage; 54.06743°N 2.27533°W	—	1664	A farmhouse converted into a house and a flat, it is stuccoed, and has stone dressings and a stone slate roof. There are three storeys and three bays. The central doorway has a moulded surround, and a decorated hood with initials and the date. The windows are sashes, and some have mullions.	II
Weavers Cottage; 54.06747°N 2.27498°W	—	1664	Three cottages, expanded in the 18th century, later combined into one, in stone with a stone slate roof. There are two storeys. The earlier part has one bay, and contains a doorway with a chamfered surround, and a decorated basket-arched lintel with the date, and a hood mould. The later part has three bays, and contains windows with chamfered surrounds, some with mullions, and casements.	II
Primrose Cottage; 54.06731°N 2.27525°W	—	Mid to late 17th century	A barn converted into two cottages and two flats. It is in stone with a stone slate roof, three storeys and four bays. A door and a window have been inserted into the former carriage arch. The windows are mullioned and contain casements.	II
The Folly; 54.06762°N 2.27535°W		1670s	A large house, later a museum, in stone, with quoins and a stone slate roof. There are three storeys, a central range and projecting gabled cross-wings. The doorway in the central range has an ornate surround, and is flanked by columns with panelled flutes, moulded capitals and finials. Above is a massive decorated lintel and a finial. On the left wing is a less ornate doorway, also with a decorated lintel. Most of the windows are mullioned and transomed, and on the ground floor they are almost continuous, extending round the right corner, and with a continuous hood mould. Inside, there is an inglenook fireplace.	I
Cottage to left of Campbells; 54.06595°N 2.27309°W	—	Late 17th century	A cottage and a barn, later a cottage, in stone with a slate roof. There are two storeys and an attic, and two bays. On the front are two doorways, one with a fanlight. The ground floor windows are sashes, and on the upper floor they are casements.	II
Friends' Meeting House; 54.06859°N 2.27927°W		1678	The meeting house, which has been extended, is in stone with sandstone dressings, a string course, and slate roofs. The building has two storeys, and a later single-storey extension. On the right is a gabled porch containing a doorway with a cambered timber lintel. The windows are a mix of casements and sashes.	II*
The Tannery; 54.06471°N 2.27307°W	—	1682	A farmhouse and barn, at one time a tannery, converted into a house, with three storeys and three bays, the left bay projecting slightly. The doorway has a chamfered surround, and a decorated basket-arched lintel with initials and the date. The windows have single lights or are mullioned. External steps lead up to a doorway in the left bay. Inside, there is an inglenook fireplace.	II
Campbells; 54.06594°N 2.27298°W	—	1692	A pair of cottages combined into one, in stone, with a stone slate roof. There are two storeys and three bays. The left doorway has a chamfered surround and a dated and initialled lintel, and the right doorway has a plain lintel. Some of the windows are mullioned, and the others have a single light with a 20th-century casement.	II
Hillside; 54.06923°N 2.27586°W		1694	The cottage is rendered, with stone dressings and a stone slate roof. There are two storeys, three bays, and a rear extension. The doorway has a chamfered surround, a dated and initialled lintel, and a round-headed wooden hood on stone brackets. To its left are three-light stepped mullioned windows, to the right, on the ground floor is a sash window, and above is a three-light mullioned window. The right bay contains a tall chamfered casement window.	II
Lower Hillside; 54.06921°N 2.27606°W		c. 1690s	The cottage is rendered, and has stone dressings, eaves modillions and a stone slate roof. There are two storeys and two bays. The doorway has a plain surround, to the far right are two two-light mullioned windows, and between are later windows.	II
House southwest of Mearbeck House; 54.04044°N 2.27868°W	—	1717	The house is in stone with a stone slate roof and two storeys. The doorway has a plain surround, and above it is an initialled datestone. The windows on the front are sashes, and at the rear are mullioned windows.	II
Cleatop Farmhouse; 54.04856°N 2.28349°W		Early 18th century	The farmhouse, which was later refronted, is in stone, with shaped eaves modillions, and a stone slate roof with coped gables and shaped kneelers. There are two storeys and three bays. In the centre is a porch, and the windows on the front are casements. At the rear are mullioned windows, and a mullioned and transomed stair window.	II
Dr Bucks House; 54.06912°N 2.27673°W		18th century	The house, at one time a bank, is in stone, with stone dressings, projecting quoins, eaves modillions, and kneelers at the gables. The doorway and windows have plain surrounds, the windows above the doorway are blind, and the others are sashes. At the rear is a mullioned and transomed stair window.	II
Fountain; 54.06883°N 2.27701°W		18th century	The fountain was moved to its present site on a new plinth in 1870. It is in stone and has a square base containing two drinking troughs, with a surround of vermiculated rustication. On this is a tapered Tuscan column with a ball finial.	II
Lamberts; 54.06828°N 2.27672°W	—	Mid-18th century	An inn, later a shop, in stone with modillion eaves and a stone slate roof. There are three storeys and three bays. The central doorway has a moulded architrave and a shell hood, and the windows are sashes in moulded architraves.	II
Rock House; 54.06850°N 2.27565°W	—	Mid-18th century	The house is rendered, and has stone dressings, projecting quoins, a string course, shaped eaves modillions, and a stone slate roof. Thee are two storeys and three bays. In the centre is a porch with Doric pilasters, and a doorway with a rectangular fanlight. It is flanked by large casement windows, each with a projecting surround and a dentilled hood on consoles. The upper floor windows have plain raised surrounds. At the rear is a doorway with an open pediment on fluted consoles.	II
Sidwells; 54.06830°N 2.27689°W	—	Mid-18th century	An inn, later a shop, in stone, with quoins on the right, modillion eaves and a stone slate roof. There are three storeys and three bays. The right bay contains a three-storey bow window. The central doorway has Ionic pilasters and a dentilled pediment. To its left is a shop window, and the upper floors contain sash windows with moulded surrounds.	II
Stockdale Farmhouse; 54.07051°N 2.22335°W		18th century	The farmhouse is in stone on a plinth, and has a string course, and a stone slate roof with coped gables, kneelers and ball finials. There are two storeys, four bays, and two parallel ranges. On the front is a gabled porch, and an entrance with a moulded pediment. The windows are sashes, and on the right return is a narrow stair window.	II
Entrance Arch, Twisleton's Yard; 54.06603°N 2.27382°W	—	18th century	Originally at the entrance to a barn, it was re-erected in 1975. The arch is in stone, and consists of a broad basket arch with chamfered jambs and voussoirs.	II
Liverpool House; 54.06744°N 2.27594°W	—	1760s	Two houses, later combined, in stone, with eaves modillions and a stone slate roof. There are three storeys and four bays. On the front are two doorways approached by steps, with plain surrounds and hoods, and to the right is the entrance to the yard, with a chamfered lintel. The windows are sashes with plain surrounds.	II
Former Co-op Butchers; 54.06802°N 2.27745°W		1774	Originally part of a hotel, later a shop, it is in stone, with painted stone dressings, projecting quoins, a heavy eaves cornice and a stone slate roof. There are two storeys and four bays. In the left bay is a coach entrance with rusticated jambs, a round arch and a keystone, and to the right is a 20th-century shopfront. The upper floor windows have raised surrounds, and above is a gabled dormer.	II
Bond End; 54.06886°N 2.27944°W	—	Late 18th century	The house is stuccoed, and has stone dressings, quoins, a moulded eaves cornice, and a slate roof with coped gables. There are two storeys and two bays. In the centre is a porch with Tuscan pilasters and an entablature, and most of the windows have mullions.	II
Linton Court and walls 54.06818°N 2.27754°W	—	c. 1780	The house is in gritstone on the front, the sides are rendered, and it has dressings in sandstone, projecting quoins, sill bands, a moulded cornice with modillions, and a stone slate roof. There are two storeys and three bays. In the centre is a recessed Tuscan porch with outer pilasters and inner columns, a plain frieze and a moulded cornice. Above the porch is a sash window, the other windows have three lights and mullions, with the central light stepped up. At the rear is a round-arched stair window. On the front of the garden is a stone wall with an archway to the left, and a mounting block. To the north of the house is a cobbled yard enclosed by a stone wall with round-topped coping, containing a doorway with a Classical doorcase.	II
Marshfield and Audley, wall and gate piers 54.06895°N 2.28008°W		c. 1780	A house, later divided, in stone, with quoins, modillion eaves, and a hipped slate roof. Thee are two storeys and seven bays, the outer bays recessed. The central doorway has engaged Ionic columns, a round-headed fanlight and an open pediment. The windows are sashes in moulded architraves. On the right return is a canted extension containing a porch. Along the front of the garden is a low wall with railings, containing a gateway with square stone piers, each with a base, a capital and a pyramidal top.	II
1–5 Constitution Hill; 54.06910°N 2.27549°W	—	Late 18th to early 19th century	A row of five rendered cottages with a stone slate roof and two storeys. The two cottages on the right have two bays each, and a doorway on the right with a plain surround and moulded Ionic capitals. To the left is a three-light mullioned window, and above are single-light windows, all with sashes. The left three cottages have one bay each. The middle cottage has a doorway with a moulded round-arched head and a keystone, and the other doorways have plain surrounds.	II
Milnthorpe House; 54.06841°N 2.27745°W	—	c. 1810	A house and shop in stone, with a Doric cornice and three mutules, and a slate roof. There are three storeys and two bays. The central doorway has panelled jambs and a rectangular fanlight, and is in a shopfront with two bay windows, a frieze and a hood. The upper floors contain sash windows with plain surrounds.	II
Former Zion Congregational Chapel; 54.06730°N 2.27462°W		1816	The former chapel is rendered, with stone dressings, chamfered quoins, modillion eaves, and a hipped slate roof. There are two storeys and three bays, and a single-storey vestry on the right. The central doorway has a round-arched head, a chamfered surround and a keystone, and the windows all have plain surrounds and round-arched heads.	II
Anley House; 54.05852°N 2.28891°W	—	c. 1818	The house is in stone, and has a sill band, a broad eaves cornice with shaped modillions, and a hipped slate roof. There are two storeys and three bays. On the front is a porch consisting of four fluted Greek Doric columns with a frieze of metopes and triglyphs. The interior of the porch has a rusticated surround and a doorway with a rectangular fanlight. The windows are sashes, those on the ground floor with recessed aprons. On the left return is a semicircular conservatory. To the north is a lower wing with two storeys and five bays, a tower and stables.	II
Jasmine Cottage; 54.06916°N 2.27627°W		Early 19th century	The house, which incorporates 17th-century features, is in stone with a stone slate roof, two storeys and three bays. The central doorway has a plain surround, it is flanked by bow windows, the upper floor contains sash windows, and to the right on the upper floor is a blocked 17h-century doorway with a basket-arched head.	II
Milestone; 54.06744°N 2.27530°W		Early 19th century	The milestone is set into a wall, it has a round head, and is about 60 centimetres (24 in) in height. It is inscribed with the distances to London, Kirkby Lonsdale, Hawes, Skipton and Lancaster.	II
Former Spar shop 54.06832°N 2.27704°W	—	Early 19th century	An inn on a corner site, later a shop, it is in stone, rendered on the right return, with quoins, eaves modillions, and a hipped stone slate roof. There are three storeys and three bays. The doorway has a moulded architrave, a semicircular fanlight, and an open pediment on moulded brackets. To its left is a shop window, and to the right is a shopfront with its entrance on the corner. In the centre of the middle floor is a warehouse door with a moulded surround, a lintel on brackets and a projecting hood. The windows are sashes with moulded surrounds.	II
Sports Shop; 54.06828°N 2.27657°W		Early 19th century	A warehouse, later a shop, in stone, with projecting quoins, a modillion pediment containing a oeil-de-boeuf window with keystones in the tympanum, and a slate roof. There are three storeys and three bays. The central doorway has moulded jambs, impost blocks, and a round head with a keystone. Above it, on each floor, is a doorway converted into a window, with a round head and a triple keystone. Flanking the doorway are bow windows, on the middle floor are sash windows, and the windows on the top floor are casements. On the top floor is a swing crane.	II
Sutcliffe House; 54.06753°N 2.27528°W	—	Early 19th century	The house, later divided into flats, is in stone, with chamfered quoins, a sill band, eaves modillions, and a stone slate roof. On the front are three storeys and a basement, and three bays. There are two entrances, each with a plain surround and a slab hood, the left with a rectangular fanlight. The windows on the lower two floors are sashes, and on the top floor they are casements. On the right return is a segmental arch with a dated and initialled datestone. At the rear are four storeys and six bays, and similar features to the front.	II
The Terrace; 54.06671°N 2.27870°W		Early 19th century	A terrace of three stuccoed houses, with a sill band, pilasters between the houses and at the ends, shaped eaves modillions, and a slate roof. There are two storeys and all the houses have three bays. Each house has a central doorway with Tuscan pilasters, a pediment with palmette decoration in the tympanum, an egg and dart frieze, and a rectangular fanlight. The windows are sashes with moulded surrounds, a cornice, and a chamfered strainer arch with a keystone, those on the ground floor with moulded aprons. The middle house projects slightly, and its middle bay further. On top of the outer houses is an urn, and the middle house has a parapet with a palmette.	II
Undercliffe House; 54.06704°N 2.27794°W	—	Early 19th century	The house is in stone, with a modillion eaves cornice and a stone slate roof. There are two storeys and three bays. In the centre is a porch with engaged Tuscan columns, a round-headed fanlight and an open pediment, and the windows are sashes. At the rear is a re-set dated and initialled lintel.	II
Devonshire House; 54.06694°N 2.27739°W	—	c. 1830	A house, at one time a shop, in stone, with an eaves cornice on corbels, and a two-span slate roof. There are two storeys and two bays. The doorway on the left has a plain surround and a moulded hood. To its right is a shop window, and above it is a window with a plain surround.	II
King's Mill; 54.07033°N 2.28536°W		c. 1830	A cotton mill, later used for other purposes, it is in stone with eaves modillions, and a stone slate roof. There are four storeys, 13 bays, and a later extension to the left. It contains doorways, windows and former loading doors.	II
Police Station; 54.06752°N 2.27721°W	—	c. 1830	A house, later a police station, in stone with a sill band, an eaves cornice and a slate roof. There are two storeys and five bays. The central doorway is flanked by two pairs of Tuscan pilasters with windows between each pair, a round-headed fanlight, and an open pediment. The windows are sashes; the window above the doorway is tripartite.	II
Settle Social Club; 54.06769°N 2.27778°W		c. 1830	Originally Ashfield House, later a social club, it is stuccoed, and has quoins on the wings, a dentilled cornice and a slate roof. There are three storeys, five bays and flanking recessed two-storey one-bay wings. In the centre is a semicircular Tuscan porch with four columns and a dentilled cornice. The ground floor windows are sashes with voussoirs and keystones, and on the upper floor are casement windows.	II
The Cottage, Duke Street; 54.06699°N 2.27742°W	—	c. 1830	The house is in stone, with an eaves cornice on corbels, and a slate roof. There are two storeys and two bays. The doorway has a plain surround and a moulded hood, and the windows are sashes with plain surrounds.	II
1 and 2 Twisletons Yard; 54.06590°N 2.27389°W	—	c. 1832	Four cottages, later two houses, in stone, with eaves modillions and a stone slate roof. There are two storeys and seven bays. On the front are three doorways with plain lintels, and the windows are sashes.	II
Office, Twisletons Yard; 54.06586°N 2.27368°W	—	c. 1832	A timesmith's shop, later an office, in stone with a stone slate roof. There are two storeys and two bays. The doorway is in the centre, and the windows are casements.	II
Town Hall; 54.06854°N 2.27688°W		1832–33	The town hall, with shops on the ground floor, was designed by George Webster, and has been converted for other uses. It is in stone and has a slate roof with gables, some shaped, and finials. There are three storeys and six bays. The main entrance to the two hall is on the south front, and above it is a datestone. Most of the windows are mullioned and transomed, some are stepped, and most have hood moulds. The doorways and shop windows on the ground floor have pointed arched heads. On the west front is an oriel window with a clock above, and there is another oriel window on the north front. Other features include octagonal turrets, and ball finials on the corners.	II
Mearbeck House; 54.04142°N 2.28010°W	—	1836	The house is in stone, with chamfered quoins, an eaves cornice, and a Welsh slate roof with gable coping. There are two storeys and three bays. The central doorway has engaged Tuscan columns, a round-headed fanlight and an open pediment, and the windows are sashes. At the rear is a doorway with a chamfered surround and a four-centred arched head.	II
Church of Holy Ascension; 54.07053°N 2.27734°W		1836–38	The church, designed by Thomas Rickman in Early English style, is in stone with a slate roof. It consists of nave, a chancel with a rectangular apse and a chapel, and a south tower. The tower has three stages, and contains a porch with an arched entrance, and engaged columns with crocket capitals. Above is a rectangular window, a bell opening with a pointed arch, and an embattled parapet. Attached to it is a four-stage octagonal bell turret rising higher than the tower, with eight hexagonal pillars, a spirelet and a ball finial. The windows on the body of the church are lancets.	II
Norlands and Milford and Company; 54.06680°N 2.27763°W		c. 1840	A house, later two offices, in stone, with quoins, shaped eaves modillions, and a slate roof. There are three storeys and three bays. In the centre is an entrance divided into two doorways, with plain jambs and a pedimented hood. Above it are two-light windows, and the outer bays contain sash windows with plain surrounds.	II
Falcon Manor Hotel; 54.06304°N 2.28112°W		1842	A large house, designed by George Webster, later a hotel, it is in stone with a stone slate roof. There are two storeys and attics, and three bays. On the front is a two-storey gabled porch containing an entrance with a moulded surround, a Tudor arched head, a hood mould, and a pediment containing a shield. Above is a sill band, a mullioned and transomed window, a three-light stepped window in the gable, and semi-octagonal buttresses with turreted finials. On the sides of the porch are pierced balustrades. Elsewhere, most of the windows are mullioned and transomed, and on the gables are ball finials. The outer bays of the garden front are gabled, and between them is a bay window with a pierced balustrade.	II
The Cottage, Victoria Street; 54.06761°N 2.27562°W	—	19th century	The house is in stone with a stone slate roof, two storeys and two bays. The doorway has a wooden surround and a hood, to the right is a large window, and the upper floor contains sash windows. At the rear is a blocked gable entrance with a moulded surround, and a massive decorated lintel with initials and a partial date.	II
Ye Olde Naked Man Cafe; 54.06874°N 2.27738°W		19th century (probable)	A house, later a café, it is rendered, with painted stone dressings, projecting quoins, and a stone slate roof. There are two storeys and two bays. The central doorway and the windows, which are casements, have plain surrounds.	II
Victoria Hall; 54.06878°N 2.27909°W		1853	A concert hall designed by E. G. Paley, it is in stone, with projecting rusticated quoins and a slate roof. The entrance front has two storeys and an attic, an overhanging gable with bargeboards, and three bays, the middle bay projecting. In the centre is a round-arched doorway with a semicircular fanlight, and the outer bays contain doorways and notice boards. Above the ground floor is a canopy on ornate iron brackets. The upper floor has sash windows with moulded hoods. Above the middle window is a cornice and a round-headed attic window.	II
Castlebergh Hall; 54.06842°N 2.27511°W		1864	Originally a drill hall for the West Riding Rifle Volunteers, later a scout hut, it is in stone on a plinth course, with quoins and a stone slate roof. There are two storeys and five bays. It is approached by external stone steps at the north gable end, and the entrance has a chamfered surround. Along the west side are five windows with arched heads and cross-mullions.	II
Golden Lion; 54.06807°N 2.27712°W		Late 19th century	The public house is in stone with a slate roof, two storeys and seven bays. The main doorway has engaged Ionic columns, a frieze and a cornice, on the right is a carriage entrance, and the windows are sashes. To the left of the main doorway is a smaller re-set doorway with a moulded surround, and a decorated, dated and initialled lintel. Inside, on the right, is an inglenook with a basket arch of voussoirs, and a round-headed arch with a keystone.	II
Passenger buildings and platforms, Settle railway station 54.06688°N 2.28075°W		1876	The buildings were designed for the Midland Railway by J. H. Sanders. The station buildings are in stone with slate roofs. They have a single storey, and four gables with bargeboards face the platform. The windows are mullioned. The front facing the yard is simpler and has sash windows. On the other platform is a simpler shelter with five bays. The platforms are in stone flags, and have retaining stone walls.	II
Stationmaster's house, Settle railway station 54.06715°N 2.28059°W		1876	The house was designed for the Midland Railway by J. H. Sanders. It is in stone with a stone slate roof, and has two storeys and a roughly cruciform plan. There are steep gables with ornamental bargeboards on all fronts, and the doorway and most of the windows have segmental heads.	II
Tank House, Settle railway station 54.06712°N 2.27985°W		1876 (probable)	The building is in stone with one storey, and fronts of three and one bay. The windows are in large recessed rectangular panels with corbels at the top. Above is a heavy modillion cornice and a large panelled metal water tank.	II
Signal box, signal and section of track 54.06641°N 2.28107°W		1891	The signal box was built by the Midland Railway, and is in timber with a hipped slate roof and spike finials. There are two storeys and two bays. The upper floor is glazed, and has an external balcony and walkway. The doorway on the north side is approached by external timber steps. Inside, there is a lever fame of 20 levers. Outside the signal box, to the north, is a twin-armed semaphore signal, and to the south is a short isolated section of track with a point blade, a set of track warning detonators and a ground signal.	II
War memorial 54.07211°N 2.28075°W		1925	The war memorial is in a garden by a road junction. It is in white granite, and consists of a stepped pedestal on an octagonal plinth. The plinth contains inscriptions and the names of those lost in the two World Wars.	II
Telephone kiosk, Cheapside; 54.06841°N 2.27632°W		1935	The telephone kiosk in Cheapside is of the K6 type designed by Giles Gilbert Scott. Constructed in cast iron with a square plan and a dome, it has three unperforated crowns in the top panels.	II
Telephone kiosk, Undercliffe; 54.06679°N 2.27788°W		1935	The telephone kiosk in Undercliffe is of the K6 type designed by Giles Gilbert Scott. Constructed in cast iron with a square plan and a dome, it has three unperforated crowns in the top panels.	II
1 and 2 Chapel Street; 54.06774°N 2.27701°W		Undated	A row of three cottages in stone, with shaped eaves modillions and a stone slate roof. There are two storeys and three bays. The three doorways have plain surrounds, and the windows are sashes.	II
