= Granada Breeze =

Former UK digital television channel

Ownership
- Owner: Granada Sky Broadcasting

History
- Launched: 1 October 1996; 30 years ago
- Closed: 31 January 2002; 24 years ago (Sky Digital and ITV Digital); March 2002; 24 years ago (Telewest); 30 April 2002; 24 years ago (NTL)
- Former names: Granada Good Life (1996–1998)

Granada Breeze was a lifestyle channel operated by Granada Sky Broadcasting, a joint venture between Granada Television and British Sky Broadcasting. The channel was launched as Granada Good Life on 1 October 1996.

== Programming ==
The channel was initially split into four three-hour segments: TV High Street (Shopping), Food & Wine (Cooking), Health & Beauty (Health) and Home & Garden (Home), under the overall banner of Granada Good Life. The channel was rebranded as Granada Breeze on 1 May 1998 and the segments were abolished in favour of a contiguous schedule.

Granada Breeze was aimed at female viewers and showed programmes on lifestyle, cookery, health, as well as U.S. daytime television shows such as Judge Joe Brown, but it is generally remembered for paranormal shows such as Psychic Livetime and Predictions with Derek Acorah; these programmes have not been shown on TV since Breeze's closure. In 1999, This Morning's resident chef Susan Brookes hosted Susan Brookes' Family Recipes on Granada Breeze with her daughter Gilly, in which they solved cooking problems for families.

The channel failed to capitalise on the increasing popularity of its paranormal shows and in 2001, the decision was made to buy in all of their shows and this lost them most of their regular viewer and the following year, the channel closed and this was put down to cost, capacity and poor ratings.

On ITV Digital, the channel shared time with Men & Motors, but when Breeze closed, a testcard was shown in its slot and was not replaced.

Two Granada Breeze regulars, Yvette Fielding and Derek Acorah, went on to feature in the popular paranormal TV show Most Haunted on Living TV.

== Closure ==
On 31 January 2002, Breeze closed down on Sky Digital and ITV Digital. It then left Telewest in mid-March 2002 and it finally shut down on 30 April 2002 on NTL. This allowed Men & Motors to extend its broadcasting hours.
