= Susan Brookes =

English television chef (born 1943)

- Born: Susan Walton; 28 November 1943 (age 82); Settle, West Riding of Yorkshire, England
- Occupations: Television chef, food writer and broadcaster
- Television: This Morning
- Spouse: Warwick Brookes
- Children: 2

Susan Brookes (née Walton; born 28 November 1943) is an English television chef, broadcaster and writer. During the 1980s and 1990s, she regularly appeared on the ITV daytime magazine show This Morning, cooking recipes for viewers as the programme's resident chef.

== Early life and education ==
Brookes was born in Settle, then part of the West Riding of Yorkshire, in 1943, and grew up in nearby Langcliffe (both areas are now in North Yorkshire) as the middle child of eight siblings, with seven brothers.

Her father, John (Jack) Ridgway Walton, originally from Manchester, was an engineering specialist in non-woven fabrics. She attended Langcliffe School and Settle High School, where she was banned from cookery classes because she talked too much. Brookes learned to cook at an early age, but had no formal training. She has a degree in politics, philosophy and English.

== Career ==
Brookes started her career as a teacher, and wrote features for her local newspaper in her spare time. She had her children at a young age, and it was not until she was 35 that Brookes embarked on her television career, before which she had taught English. In 1980, she applied for a job as a researcher, and worked on programmes for Granada Television in Manchester, beginning with Live From Two, followed by The Krypton Factor. Brookes was persuaded to do a screen test with Oenone Williams of Exchange Flags, a lunchtime current affairs programme for the North West of England. She then began to present, appearing on Late Night From Two with Shelley Rohde in 1982. The Liverpool Echo described Brookes on this programme as "Granada's answer to Gloria Hunniford." Brookes also hosted Exchange Flags.

It was Brookes' idea to have a cookery series "about down to earth food, not entertaining or posh food"; she was told she could present it if she did a screen test, which she agreed to. Her first programme, On the Market, ran for four years, from 1983 to 1987, and took her around the North of England. The series, which developed from "Talking Shop", a slot Brookes had on Exchange Flags, focused on seasonal foods and cooking with bargain buys. "The thing that annoys me about cookery programmes is that they are not the real world. They don't deal with the kind of things that go through your mind when you're going round the shops," Brookes commented, prior to the programme starting. "I'm not an expert myself. I just regard myself as a normal run-of-the-mill cook." In 1986, she began presenting Gardener's Calendar Roadshow, a Granada production for Channel 4.

=== This Morning ===
Brookes, a former amateur theatrical, applied to be a producer for ITV's new daytime show This Morning, but was instead chosen to be its resident chef, to her surprise. Beginning with the first edition of the programme on 3 October 1988, Brookes was a feature on the popular show, and stayed with the programme over ten years. During this period, as her profile rose, she wrote columns for Dalesman and Inside Soap magazines. Brookes also appeared on Yorkshire Television's Tonight, and programmes for the Granada Good Life channel. Her fame was such that she was referenced in the 1999 sitcom Mrs Merton and Malcolm.

In 1995, she was the winner of the Best TV Chef in the World award at the inaugural International Festival of Gastronomy in Deauville, Normandy. It was reported that the judges were impressed by a 10-minute taped item of Brookes, resulting in her beating over 40 other TV chefs from 32 countries. Her prize-winning recipe was chicken supreme with cider and apples, using British ingredients. Commenting on the award, she said: "Fancy an English chef winning a cookery prize in France! I think the British have learnt from the French through holidaying there, but while their cuisine has made us more adventurous as a nation the French have become stuck in an idea that their gastronomy is carved in stone and not to be developed." Brookes was subsequently president of the jury at the contest.

Brookes has authored a number of cookery books, starting with Brookes Cooks This Morning in 1990. The follow-up, Truly Wonderful Puddings and Desserts (1995), made The Times/Dillons Bestsellers lists upon its release. Her third book, Susan Brookes' Yorkshire Kitchen (1996), had a foreword written by playwright Alan Bennett, a fellow resident of the Yorkshire Dales, who wrote, "Susan's recipes are for good, straightforward, tasty stuff with not a lot of time wasted on exotic garnishes or elaborate presentation. Nouvelle cuisine it isn't, thank goodness."

In 1999, she hosted Susan Brookes' Family Recipes on Granada Breeze with her daughter Gilly, in which they solved cooking problems for families. Brookes has since retired, but contributed a recipe to a local school's charity fundraiser book in 2007.

== Personal life ==
She is married to Warwick Brookes, a retired schoolmaster, and the couple have two daughters. They live in Long Preston, a village in North Yorkshire. In the 1980s, Susan was resident in nearby Giggleswick, the same village as television personality Russell Harty, a family friend who was best man at her wedding. She took part in ITV's documentary The Unforgettable Russell Harty in 2012.

During the 25th anniversary edition of This Morning in October 2013, which featured appearances from former cast members, it was noted that Brookes was unwell, and she did not take part in the programme. For This Morning's 30th anniversary in 2018, however, Brookes appeared on screen in the studio, joining the cast for lunch. During this appearance, she revealed that she suffered from coeliac disease. In November 2022, Brookes made a rare public appearance as a judge at a Halloween party in her village.

== Bibliography ==
- Brookes Cooks This Morning, Boxtree (ISBN 978-1852830854, 1990)
- Truly Wonderful Puddings & Desserts, Hamlyn (ISBN 978-0600587163, 1995)
- This Morning Countdown to Christmas (contributor), HarperCollinsPublishers (ISBN 978-0004127880, 1995)
- Susan Brookes' Yorkshire Kitchen, Dalesman (ISBN 978-1855681095, 1996)
- Get Cooking! with This Morning (with Brian Turner), HarperCollins (ISBN 978-0004140063, 1996)
- Susan Brookes' Real Home Cooking, HarperCollins (ISBN 978-0004140513, 1998)
- Mrs Brookes' Baker's Dozen, André Deutsch (ISBN 978-0233998824, 1999)
- Cobbled Together: A Personal View of Cobbles and Setts in Long Preston, Long Preston Heritage Group (OCLC 816137310, 2011)
