= Long Preston =

Village and civil parish in North Yorkshire, England

Coordinates: 54°01′11″N 2°15′18″W

- Location within North Yorkshire
- Population: 742 (2011 census)
- OS grid reference: SD835585
  - London: 200 mi (320 km) south-east
- Unitary authority: North Yorkshire
- Ceremonial county: North Yorkshire
- Region: Yorkshire and the Humber
- Country: England
- Sovereign state: United Kingdom
- Post town: SKIPTON
- Postcode district: BD23
- Dialling code: 01729
- Police: North Yorkshire
- Fire: North Yorkshire
- Ambulance: Yorkshire
- UK Parliament: Skipton & Ripon

Long Preston is a village and civil parish in the county of North Yorkshire, England, in the Yorkshire Dales. It lies along the A65 road, and is 12 miles (19 km) from Skipton and 4 miles (6 km) from Settle. The population of Long Preston in 2001 was 680, increasing to 742 at the 2011 Census.

Until 1974 it was part of the West Riding of Yorkshire. From 1974 to 2023 it was part of the Craven District, it is now administered by the unitary North Yorkshire Council.

== History ==
=== Early times ===
Humans have been in the Long Preston area since prehistoric times; remains have been found in caves on the hills above Settle and an axe head dated to the Stone Age was found in the area of Bookil Gill. The presence of a Roman Road through the village, led to the discovery of a small fort in what is now part of the churchyard of St Mary's Church.

=== Middle Ages ===
Long Preston is mentioned in the Domesday Book, where it is described as Prestune, later being registered as Prestona in Cravana. Prestune means "the priest's farmstead or town". Later, the prefix "Long" was added, referring to the length of the village. Long Preston was part of the old west division of Staincliffe Wapentake.

A school was built in the village during the reign of Edward IV (1461–1483) as part of the Hammerton Chapel. It is likely that it was closed in 1541 during the dissolution of the religious houses. In 1672 the Petty School was held, most likely either in the chapel or in a building near an old vicarage. A new school replaced the Petty School in 1819.

=== Industrial age ===
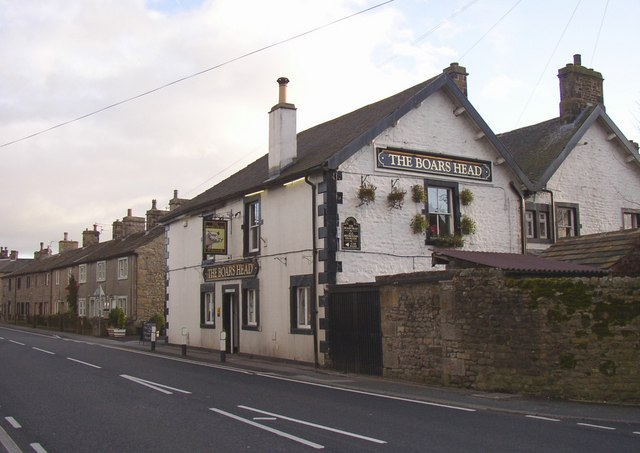
The Boar's Head, once a coaching inn serving travellers on the turnpike

In the 18th and 19th centuries, Long Preston was dominated by agriculture and the trades associated with it. In the 1750s a turnpike road was constructed from Long Preston to Settle. In the 1960s this road (now the A65) was raised, widened, and straighted. Several homes and farms were demolished to accomplish this.

In 1790, a cotton spinning mill was constructed, possibly on the site of an old corn mill. The mill was demolished in 1881 due to flooding. Later on Fleets cotton mill was built, which was three storeys high and water powered.

The railway was opened in 1849 and expanded in 1875 with the building of the Settle-Carlisle Line. It declined in the 1970s and '80s but is now seeing an increase in heavy freight and passenger traffic.

In 1801 the population of Long Preston was 573; this rose to 808 in 1831 but dropped to 610 in 1961.

=== Modern day ===
Between 1923 and 1935, Long Preston was the railhead for the construction of Stocks Reservoir built by the Fylde Water Board (FWB). Steam traction engines hauled material between the FWB depot, to the west of the current station, by road to Tosside where connection was made with a 3-foot gauge industrial railway system that served the dam construction project.

In the 20th century, most people were employed in the village at the garage, wool warehouse, auction mart, farms or in the surrounding area, e.g. Skipton. A number of houses were rented at Long Preston making it affordable to live there. In the 1960s people started to purchase their own homes.

In the late 1950s and early 1960s, there was a livestock auction mart, shoe shop, tailors, butchers, bakers, post office, cafés, wool warehouse and corn mill.

A bypass was proposed and was given the go-ahead in 1994 but after the 1997 general election, with Labour gaining power, the bypass was scrapped.

== Transport ==
Long Preston is served by Long Preston railway station, which is on the Leeds to Morecambe Line.

== Education ==
Long Preston has a primary school, Long Preston Endowed School, with around 60 pupils attending over a range of seven year groups.

== Media ==
Local TV coverage are covered by both BBC North West Tonight and BBC Look North on BBC One & by, ITV Granada Reports and ITV News Calendar on ITV1.

Long Preston is served by both BBC Radio Lancashire on 95.5 FM and BBC Radio York on 104.3 FM. Other radio stations also received are Greatest Hits Radio Yorkshire (formerly Stray FM) on 107.8 FM and community based station, Drystone Radio on 103.5 FM.

Local newspaper is the Craven Herald & Pioneer. Long Preston is the home of audiobook producer Magna Story Sound.

== Notable people ==
- Former television chef Susan Brookes is a resident of the village.
- Thomas Nuttall (1786–1859), botanist and zoologist, was born in Long Preston

== See also ==
- Listed buildings in Long Preston
