= Annice Sidwells =

Annice Sidwells (1902–2001) was a star of early wireless radio in the UK as a contralto singer. Sidwells was born in Settle, West Riding of Yorkshire, England. Her talent belied the meagre settings of an amateur operatic society in a remote Yorkshire market town, and Sidwells became a star of the early radio broadcasts of the BBC.

Sidwells married Matt Haygarth—a romantic story that was remembered and celebrated in a Yorkshire Television documentary in 1985.

Sidwells died at the age 99 in 2001, and is buried in Settle.
