= St Mary's Church, Long Preston =

Church in Long Preston, North Yorkshire, England

Coordinates: 54°01′07″N 2°15′00″W

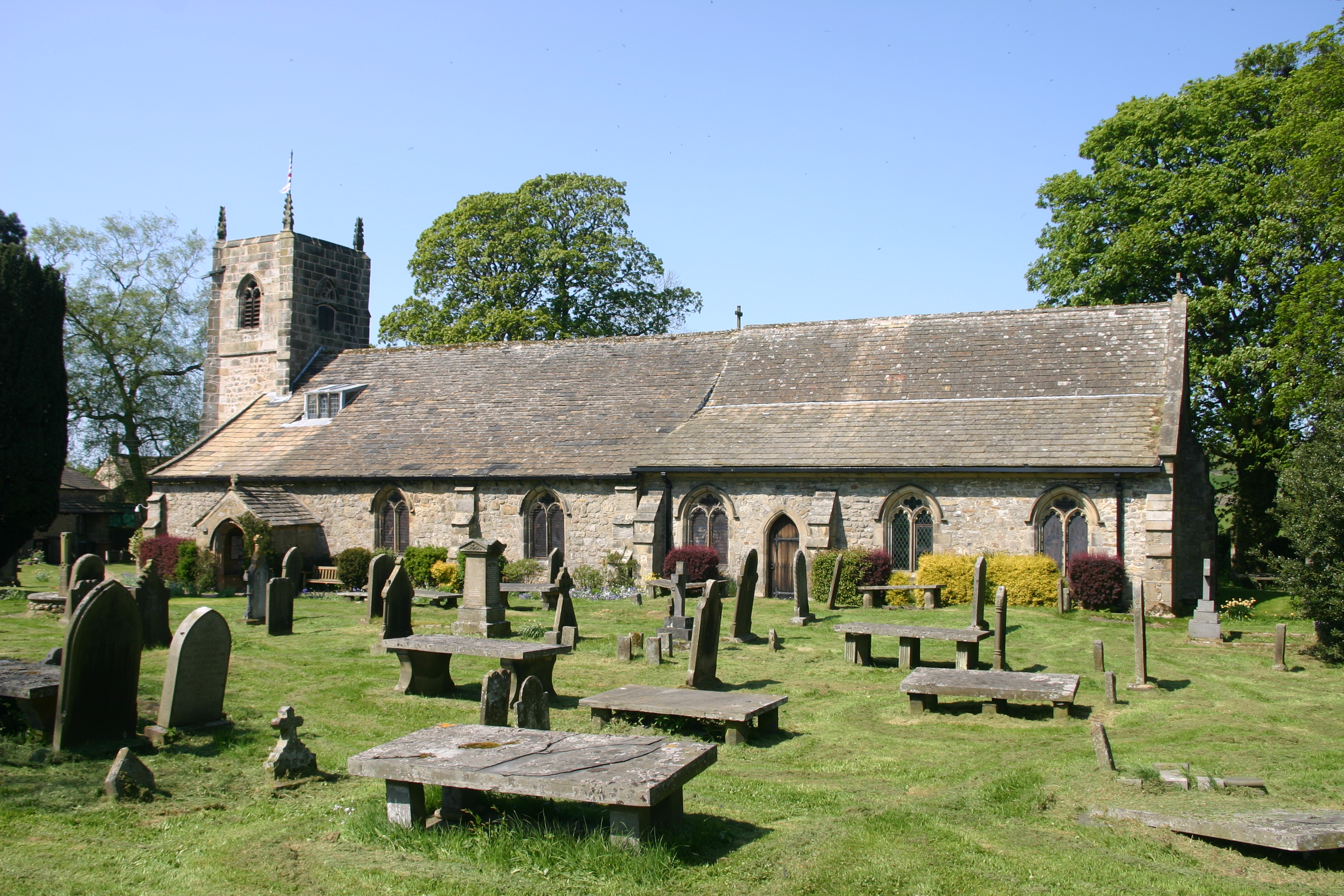
The church, in 2011

St Mary's Church is the parish church of Long Preston, a village in North Yorkshire, in England.

There was a church in Long Preston at the time of the Domesday Book, but the current church was probably built in the late 14th century. The chancel was largely rebuilt from 1867 to 1868, to a design by Thomas Healey. The building was grade I listed in 1958.

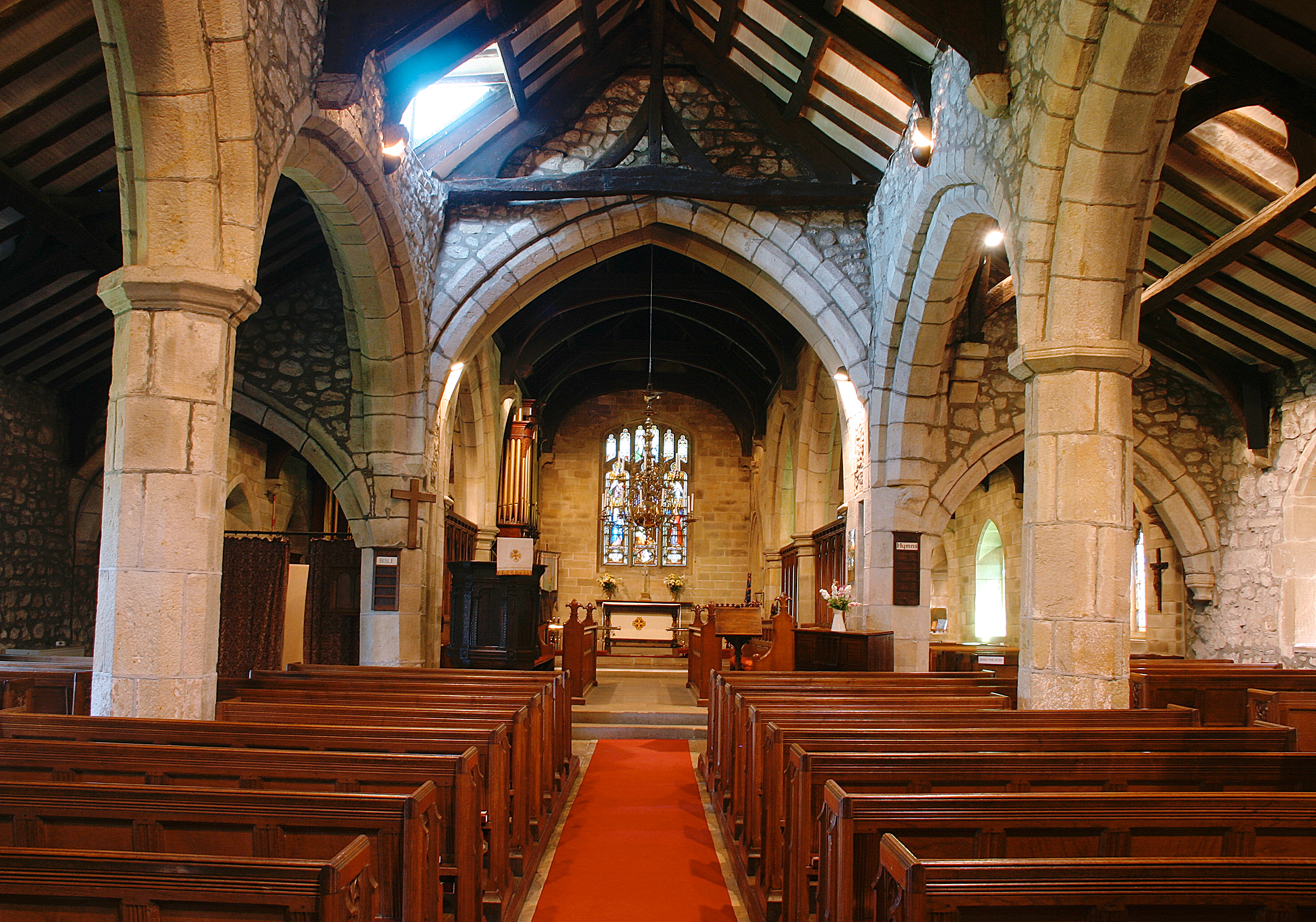
View from the nave into the chancel

The church is built of stone, with millstone grit dressings, and a stone slate roof. It consists of a nave, north and south aisles, a south porch, a chancel, north and south chapels, and a west tower. The tower has three stages, diagonal buttresses, a clock face on the west, two-light bell openings, and crocketed corner finials. The porch is gabled, and has a moulded entrance surround, a segmental pointed arch, a hood mould and a trefoil cross on the apex. Inside, there is a late-17th century pulpit, a Romanesque font with a canopy dating from 1726, Minton tiles in the chancel, and some stained glass by Jean-Baptiste Capronnier.

== See also ==
- Grade I listed buildings in North Yorkshire (district)
- Listed buildings in Long Preston
