= Zion Memorial Chapel (New Hamburg, New York) =

Historic church in New York, United States

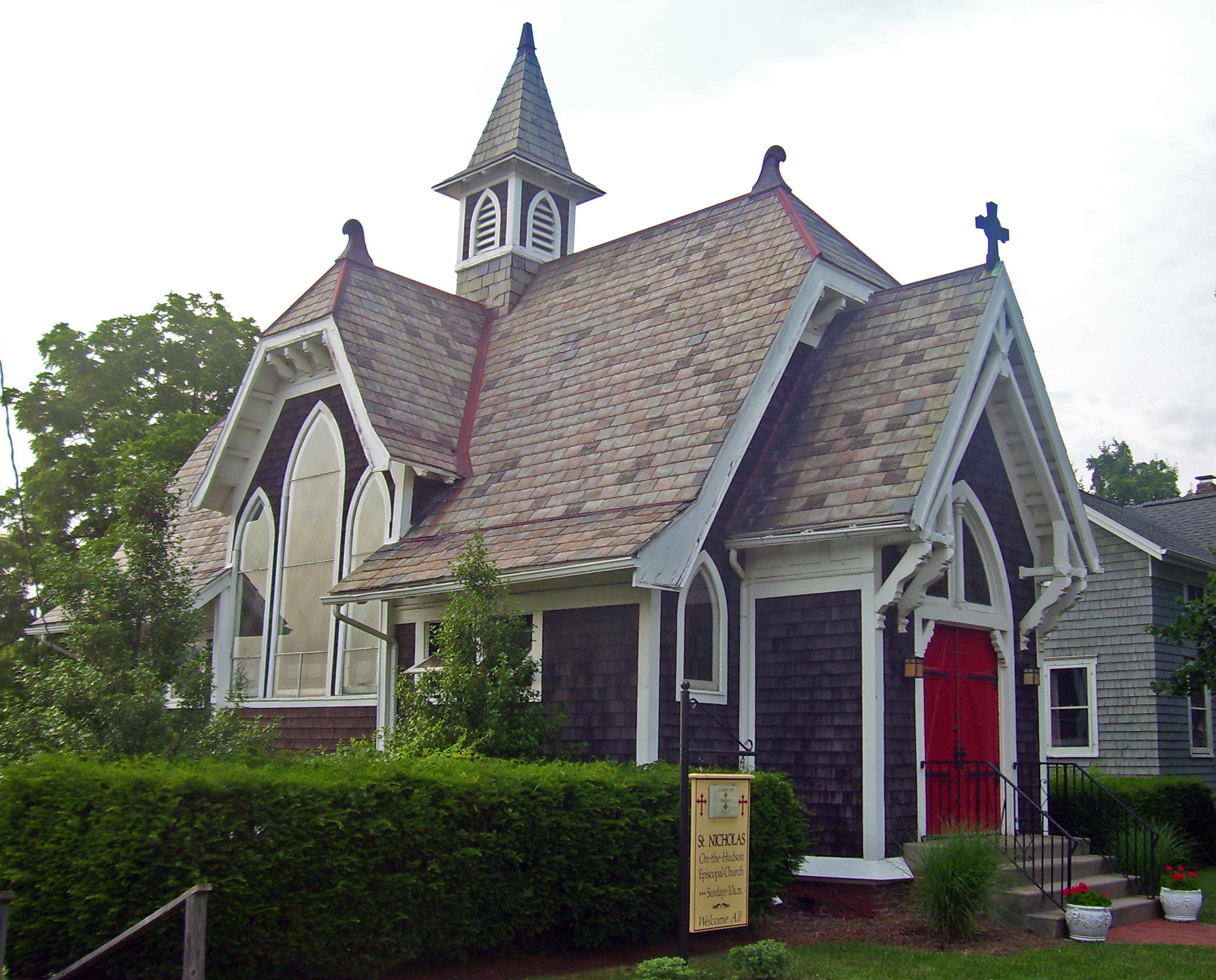
- Front (east) elevation and south profile, 2008

Religion
- Affiliation: Episcopal Church
- Ecclesiastical or organisational status: active
- Leadership: The Rev. Astrid Joy Storm
- Year consecrated: 1903

Location
- Location: New Hamburg, NY, USA
- Interactive map of Zion Memorial Chapel
- Coordinates: 41°35′18″N 73°56′58″W

Architecture
- Architect: Edward Lansing Satterlee
- Type: chapel
- Style: Gothic Revival
- General contractor: William O'Rourke
- Groundbreaking: 1902
- Direction of façade: east

U.S. National Register of Historic Places
- Added to NRHP: 1987
- NRHP Reference no.: 87000119

Website
- St. Nicholas-on-the-Hudson

Zion Memorial Chapel, now known as St. Nicholas-on-the-Hudson, is an historic Carpenter Gothic style Episcopal church building located at 37 Point Street in New Hamburg, New York, United States. It was built in 1902 as a chapel of nearby Zion Church in Wappingers Falls and became a separate parish in 1983.

The small wooden church building overlooks the nearby Hudson River. It was built in the early 20th century in a late interpretation of the Gothic Revival architectural style. For that reason it was listed on the National Register of Historic Places in 1987.

== Building ==
The church is a one-story frame structure on a brick foundation. It takes a form common to late 19th-century rural churches, with a main block housing the sanctuary and projecting pavilions housing the front vestibule and altar. It is sided in brown-stained wood shingles. The steeply-pitched cross-gabled roof is covered in slate with a belfry. Its ridges end in jerkin heads with a metallic wave-shaped finial. At the eaves the roof flares into soffits decorated with scroll-sawn rafter ends and brackets. The front entranceway also has decorative bracework.

On either side there is, in the middle of the cross-gable, a group of three narrow Gothic-arched windows. They are filled with translucent leaded glass bordered by stained glass. On the rear, over the altar, is a stained-glass window in a rosette pattern.

The church's interior has not been altered since its construction. It is finished entirely in plaster, with two four-globed gasoliers hanging from the ceiling. Two sets of unpainted wooden pews are divided by a center aisle. An all-purpose room in the basement serves as the vicar's office and storage space.

== History ==
When the Zion Episcopal Church of Wappingers Falls was founded in 1876, its parish included nearby New Hamburg. Two of its congregants, William Henry Willis and his wife Adele Satterlee, pushed for the construction of the chapel around 1900 to serve residents in the latter community. Satterlee, who was also a close relative of Zion's rector, pushed for the church commission to be given to her nephew Edward Lansing Satterlee. Following President William McKinley's assassination in 1901, contributions to the building fund rose and it was decided to add "Memorial" to the chapel's name.

No significant alterations have been made to the building since it opened in 1902. It was maintained jointly by laypeople and clergy until 1983, when it became its own parish. As of 2008 its congregation has about 40–50 members. It is the only institutional building in New Hamburg still used for its original purpose.

== Aesthetics ==
The Gothic Revival style had largely been discarded for new churches in the United States by the turn of the 20th century, as the newer Romanesque Revival became the preferred. Satterlee's design therefore represents the final stage of its evolution, begun with the ideas of the American Ecclesiological Movement in the 1840s.

Its most prominent Gothic Revival features are the cross-gabled roof, lancet windows, and the plaster and unpainted wood of the interior. However, Satterlee incorporated some aspects of later 19th-century trends as well. The cross-bracing on the vestibule porch and the use of shingled siding suggest the Stick and Shingle styles respectively. The textural contrast of the brick, wood and slate exterior surfaces and the flaring rakeboards presage touches that became more common in the 20th century.
