= Settle, North Yorkshire =

Market town and civil parish in North Yorkshire, England

Coordinates: 54°04′05″N 2°16′40″W

Settle
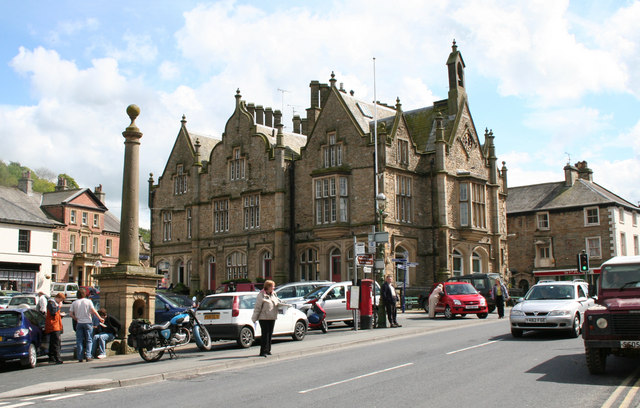
- Settle Town Hall

- Location within North Yorkshire
- Population: 2,564 (2011 census)
- OS grid reference: SD816640
  - London: 200 mi (320 km) SE
- Civil parish: Settle
- Unitary authority: North Yorkshire
- Ceremonial county: North Yorkshire
- Region: Yorkshire and the Humber
- Country: England
- Sovereign state: United Kingdom
- Post town: SETTLE
- Postcode district: BD24
- Dialling code: 01729
- Police: North Yorkshire
- Fire: North Yorkshire
- Ambulance: Yorkshire
- UK Parliament: Skipton & Ripon
- Website: https://www.visitsettle.co.uk/

Settle is a market town and civil parish in North Yorkshire, England. Historically in the West Riding of Yorkshire, the town had a population of 2,421 in the 2001 census, increasing to 2,564 at the 2011 census.

== History ==
Settle is thought to have 7th-century Anglian origins, its name being the Angle word for settlement. Craven in the Domesday Book shows that, until 1066, Bo was the lord of Settle but after the Harrying of the North (1069–1071) the land was granted to Roger de Poitou.

In 1250, a market charter was granted to Henry de Percy, 7th feudal baron of Topcliffe by Henry III. A market square developed and the main route through the medieval town was aligned on an east–west direction, from Albert Hill, Victoria Street, High Street and Cheapside and on through Kirkgate. This road led to Giggleswick where the citizens attended the parish church. The first bridge over the River Ribble was mentioned in 1498.

During the English Civil War, the Cliffords, the lords of the manor were Royalists, but their subjects were not. John Lambert of Calton in Malhamdale, was a general in Cromwell's army and his troops camped at Settle in August 1651 while on the road to an encounter in Lancaster.

== Infrastructure ==
Daniel Defoe wrote "Settle is the capital of an isolated little kingdom of its own surrounded by barren hills." Because of its remoteness Settle saw mostly local commerce. The old roads were pack horse trails and drovers' roads along hilltops because the valley was soft and swampy before field drainage and the dredging of stream estuaries.

In the 1700s, textile industrialists supported by traders and landowners campaigned for a turnpike to connect with growing industrial towns. The minute book for the Keighley and Kendal Turnpike Trust shows that most investors were mill owners from the Giggleswick district. In 1827, the trust, having miscalculated the cost of road maintenance, was in debt by £34,000. When in 1877 the trust was terminated, the investors received on average 54% of their deposit. The investors benefited because Settle was now well connected and its cotton mills boomed. The mill owners imported coal and, like the heavy industries that exported agricultural lime and sandstone masonry, welcomed the turnpike for access via carrier waggons to the Leeds and Liverpool Canal at Gargrave. The first passenger stagecoach arrived in 1763. The Mail Coach was running regularly in 1786. The Union coach for passengers ran each way on alternate days in the early 1800s and daily by 1840.

The "little" North Western Railway reached Giggleswick in 1847 and, in 1849, the railway company constructed Station Road from Giggleswick to Settle. In 1875, the Settle to Carlisle Railway was built and opened to goods traffic; passenger services commenced the following year when Settle railway station opened along with a goods warehouse, cattle pens, signal box and water cranes.

In the late 18th century, cotton spinning became the town's main employment. Bridge End Mill was converted from corn milling to cotton spinning. John Procter operated mills at Runley and King's Mill which were taken over by his son Thomas. He built the row of workers' cottages, Procter's Row in Lower Kirkgate. In 1835, Dog Kennel Mill and Brennand's Weaving Shed, Settle had five mills employing 333 people.

== Governance ==
Settle is part of the parliamentary constituency of Skipton and Ripon, represented in the House of Commons of the UK Parliament since 2010 by Julian Smith MP, a Conservative.

Before 1 April 2023, Settle was in the Settle and Ribblebank ward of Craven District Council and the Ribblesdale division of North Yorkshire County Council. Following local government reorganisation, it is now in the Settle & Penyghent division of the new North Yorkshire Council unitary authority. The division is represented by 1 Conservative Councillor.

Settle is served by a town council made up of 10 councillors. The mayor is elected annually and the current Town Mayor is Councillor Debi Rymer. The Deputy Mayor is Councillor Stephen Hogg.

Since 1992, the town has been twinned with the French Mediterranean seaside town of Banyuls-sur-Mer.

== Geography ==
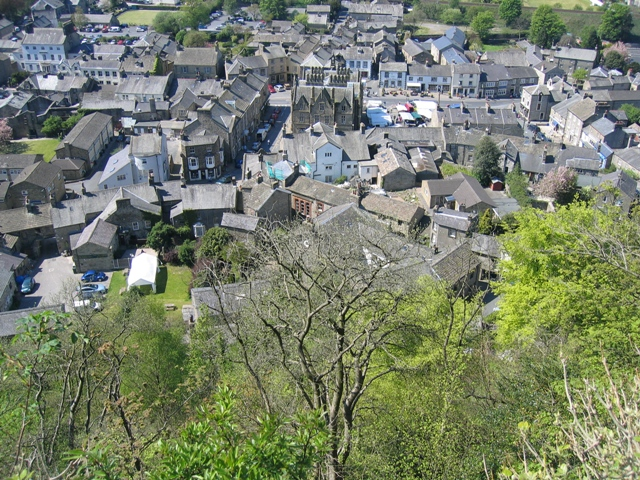
View from Castlebergh

Settle was part of the West Riding of Yorkshire. It is located in Ribblesdale, at the southern edge of the Yorkshire Dales, within a few miles of the Three Peaks. Immediately overlooking the town is Castlebergh, a 300 feet (91 m) limestone crag, and to the east is Malham which was in the former Settle Rural District. The River Ribble provided power for Settle's former cotton mills; it is now being harnessed by Settle Hydro, a micro hydroelectric scheme, to provide 50 kW of power to the National Grid, which was opened in 2009.

== Transport ==
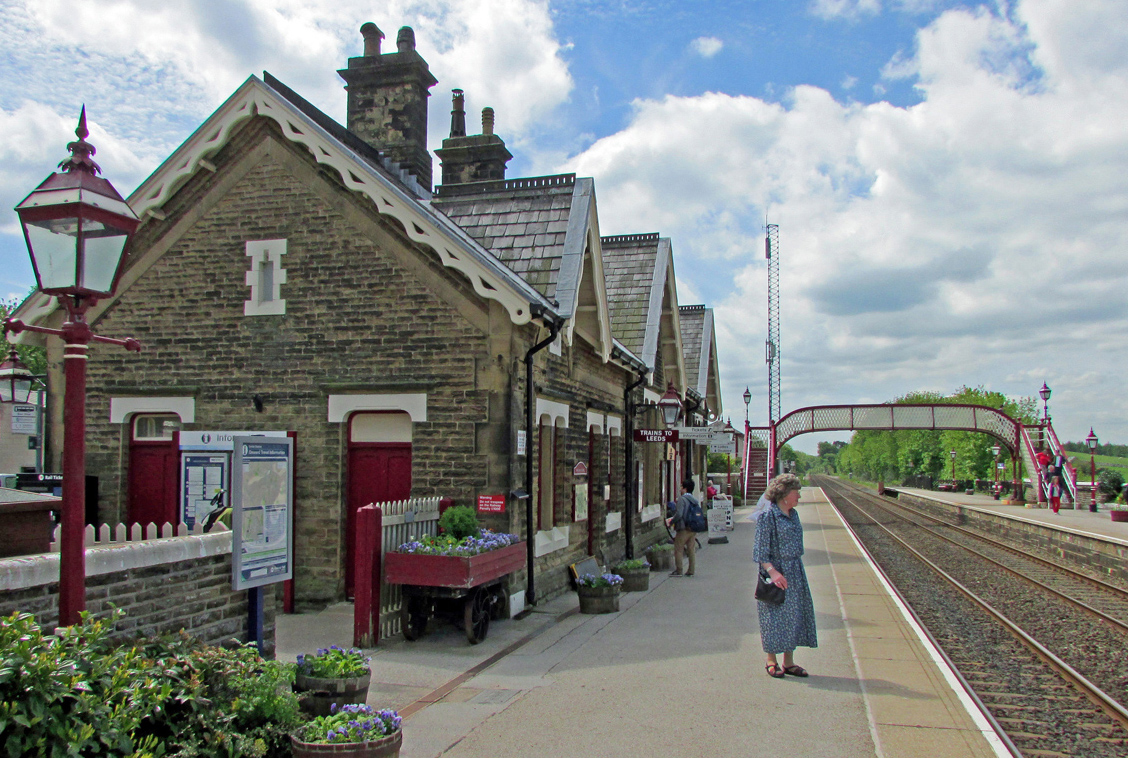
Settle station, looking to the south

Settle railway station is situated on the Settle & Carlisle line. It is served by Northern Trains, who operate services between Leeds and Carlisle. Giggleswick railway station is sited 1 mile (1.6 km) away from Settle and is on the Bentham line between Leeds and Morecambe.

Bus routes are operated by Kirkby Lonsdale Coaches and North Yorkshire Council, which link the town with Clitheroe, Giggleswick, Horton in Ribblesdale, Kirkby Lonsdale, Skipton and Wigglesworth.

The town is located 29 miles (47 km) from Leeds Bradford Airport.

The main road through Settle is the B6480, which links to the A65; it connects the town with Leeds, Ilkley, Skipton and Kendal.

== Local media ==
Since the town is closest to the Lancashire and North Yorkshire border, local news and television programmes are provided by BBC North West and Granada Television that broadcast from Salford. Local radio stations are BBC Radio York on 104.3 FM, Greatest Hits Radio Yorkshire on 107.8 FM, and Dales Radio on 104.9 FM. The town's local newspaper is the Craven Herald & Pioneer.

== Tourism ==
Settle's market is held weekly on Tuesdays in the town-centre marketplace and in the Victoria Hall, a short distance away on Kirkgate. Settle Town Hall was sold by Craven District Council to a developer in October 2011. The Square is surrounded by local businesses, most of which are family-owned, with some offering items for sale unique to the Settle area. The Naked Man is believed to be the oldest cafe in the country.

The Yorkshire Festival of Story brings artists to the town and has a range of paid-for and free events suitable for all age ranges. The festival attracts visitors from around the world and audiences have more than trebled in size since the first festival in 2010. The event is the largest of its kind in the North of England. The Yorkshire Festival of Story is produced by Settle Stories an arts and heritage charity based in the town. Since 2014 the Flowerpot Festival has brightened the town's streets.

The Folly is a 17th-century Grade I listed building on the main street. In 1996, the North Craven Building Preservation Trust purchased part of the Folly, restored it and opened it to the public in 2001. The Folly houses the Museum of North Craven Life and hosts exhibitions during the open season. There are permanent displays, including the Settle to Carlisle Railway, Robert (Mouseman) Thompson furniture and local history. The rest of the building has been purchased by the trust. The museum is independent and run by volunteers.

The Gallery on the Green is thought to be the smallest art gallery in the world: drawings, paintings, photographs and other works are housed in a former BT telephone kiosk. Gavagan Arts at Linton Court Gallery is situated in a courtyard off Duke Street. The gallery presents a series of temporary exhibitions of modern and contemporary art.

The Listening Gallery is an audio gallery in an old phone box. The gallery has changing exhibitions and is open 365 days a year and is free to enter. The box is maintained and was created by Settle Stories.

The district has several caves where prehistoric remains have been found, the most notable being Victoria Cave, so-called because the inner chamber was discovered in 1837 on the day of Queen Victoria's accession. The cave is a geological SSSI and scheduled monument. Victoria Cave contained fossil remains. The earliest, at 130,000 years old, include mammoth, straight-tusked elephant, cave bear and hippopotamus, Bos primigenius, Rhinoceros leptorhinus and spotted hyenas (as a bed of hyena bones). They date to an Upper Pleistocene interglacial. After the last Ice Age the cave was used by hibernating brown bear and reindeer. Associated with the later deposits were a harpoon head carved from antler; flint implements and other ornaments. The discovery of flint is noteworthy as it is not found naturally in the area. Craven Museum & Gallery in Skipton has an exhibition of items which includes a bear's skull found in one of the caves.

== Cultural ==
The composer Edward Elgar visited Settle on many occasions to visit his friend Dr Charles William Buck. There is a blue plaque at Cravendale to commemorate this.

== Education ==
Settle has two schools, with Settle Primary School and Settle College. Settle Middle School closed as part of the money-saving measures taken by North Yorkshire County Council. To the west of the town is Giggleswick School, one of the principal private schools in the North of England, founded in 1512.

== Notable people ==
- Richard Bache (1737–1811), merchant, American Postmaster General and son-in-law of Benjamin Franklin
- George Birkbeck (1776–1841), founder of the Mechanics' Institutes; Birkbeck, University of London is named after him
- Benjamin Waugh (1839–1908) founder of the NSPCC, commemorated by a plaque on what is now the Neil Wright Estate Agents in Settle town square
- George Howson (1860–1919), reforming headmaster
- Francis Morphet Twisleton (1873–1917), military leader and letter writer
- Theodore Rigg (1888–1972), agricultural chemist
- Annice Sidwells (1902–2001), radio singer
- James Frederic Riley (1912–1985) radiologist and finder of the link between mast cells and asthma
- Claire Brooks (1931–2008), lawyer and politician
- Don Wilson (1937–2012), England and Yorkshire cricketer
- Susan Brookes (born c. 1943/44), television chef, born in Settle
- Mike Harding (born 1944), singer and comedian
- James Brown (born 1984), guitarist from Pulled Apart by Horses attended Settle College
- Emma Lonsdale (born 1984), freestyle skier and 2014 Winter Olympian
- James Newman (born 1985), singer, songwriter and the representative for the United Kingdom at the Eurovision Song Contest 2020 and 2021
- John Newman (born 1990), soul singer

== See also ==
- Listed buildings in Settle, North Yorkshire
- Castleberg Hospital
