= Craven District Council elections =

Local government elections in North Yorkshire, England

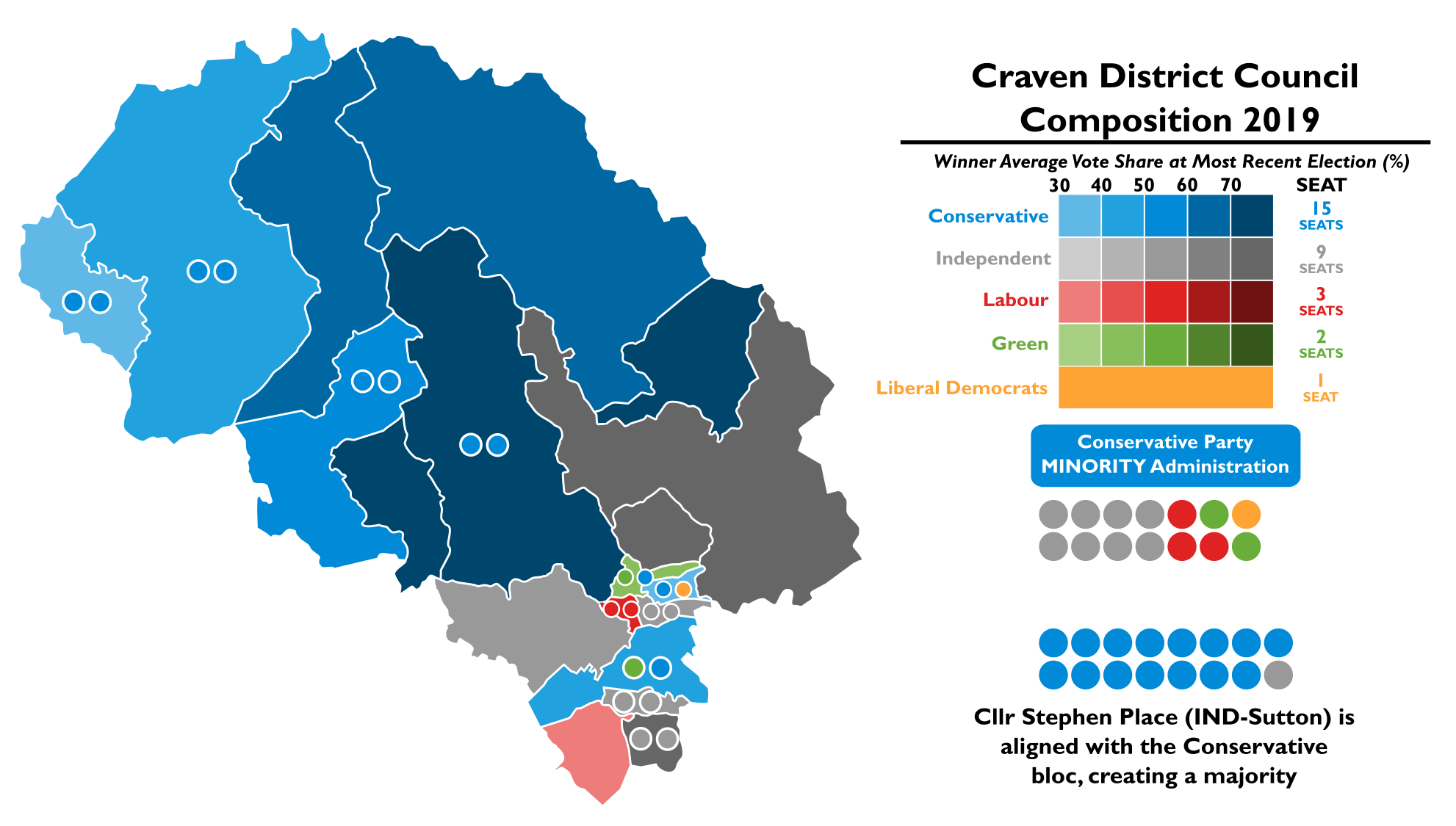
Map showing the composition of Craven District Council as of the 2019 election. Conservatives in blue, independents in grey, Liberal Democrats in yellow, Green Party in green, and Labour in red.

Craven District Council in North Yorkshire, England was established in 1974 and abolished in 2023. One third of councillors were elected each year, followed by one year when there was an election to North Yorkshire County Council instead. After the last boundary changes in 2002, 30 councillors were elected from 19 wards.

== Political control ==
The first election to the council was held in 1973, initially operating as a shadow authority alongside the outgoing authorities until it came into its powers on 1 April 1974. Political control from 1974 until its abolition in 2023 was as follows:

Party in control	Years
No overall control	1974–1976
Conservative	1976–1986
No overall control	1986–1996
Liberal Democrats	1996–1998
No overall control	1998–1999
Conservative	1999–2001
No overall control	2001–2010
Conservative	2010–2023

=== Leadership ===
The leaders of the council from 2000 until the council's abolition in 2023 were:

Councillor	Party	From	To
Chris Knowles-Fitton	Conservative	2000	2002
Carl Lis	Independent	2002	20 May 2008
Chris Knowles-Fitton	Conservative	20 May 2008	30 Oct 2014
Richard Foster	Conservative	Dec 2014	31 Mar 2023

== Council elections ==
Summary of the council composition after recent council elections, click on the year for full details of each election. Boundary changes took place for the 2002 election, leading to the whole council being elected in that year and reducing the number of seats by four.

- 1973 Craven District Council election
- 1976 Craven District Council election
- 1979 Craven District Council election (New ward boundaries)
- 1980 Craven District Council election
- 1982 Craven District Council election
- 1983 Craven District Council election (District boundary changes took place but the number of seats remained the same)
- 1984 Craven District Council election
- 1986 Craven District Council election
- 1987 Craven District Council election

Year	Conservative	Independent	Liberal Democrats	Labour	UKIP	Green	Vacant	Notes
1988	12	6	13	3	0	0	0	
1990	12	7	12	3	0	0	0	
1991	12	7	12	3	0	0	0	
1992	13	6	12	3	0	0	0	District boundary changes took place but the number of seats remained the same
1994	11	6	14	3	0	0	0	
1995	6	6	17	5	0	0	0	
1996	6	4	18	6	0	0	0	
1998	13	4	13	4	0	0	0	
1999	19	10	4	1	0	0	0	
2000	18	12	4	0	0	0	0	
2002	13	8	9	0	0	0	0	New ward boundaries
2003	11	10	9	0	0	0	0	
2004	13	11	6	0	0	0	0	
2006	13	11	6	0	0	0	0	
2007	13	11	6	0	0	0	0	
2008	15	10	5	0	0	0	0	
2010	18	8	4	0	0	0	0	
2011	18	8	4	0	0	0	0	
2012	16	10	4	0	0	0	0	
2014	18	9	2	0	0	0	1	
2015	20	6	2	1	1	0	0	Some new ward boundaries
2016	18	7	1	3	1	0	0	
2018	18	7	1	3	1	0	0	
2019	15	9	1	3	0	2	0	

== District result maps ==
2002 results map

2003 results map

2004 results map

2006 results map

2007 results map

2008 results map

2010 results map

2011 results map

2012 results map

2014 results map

2015 results map

2016 results map

2018 results map

2019 results map

== By-election results ==
By-elections occur when seats become vacant between council elections. Below is a summary of recent by-elections; full by-election results can be found by clicking on the by-election name.

By-election	Date	Incumbent party	Winning party
Helifield	20 March 1997	Liberal Democrats	Conservative
Sutton	20 March 1997	Conservative	Liberal Democrats
Skipton South West	1 May 1997	Independent	Labour
Skipton West	30 October 1997	Liberal Democrats	Conservative
Skipton East by-election	9 March 2000	Independent	Independent
Skipton South by-election	7 June 2001	Conservative	Liberal Democrats
Bentham by-election	13 November 2003	Liberal Democrats	Independent
Upper Wharfedale by-election	2 March 2006	Conservative	Conservative
Cowling by-election	12 July 2007	Independent	Conservative
Skipton West by-election	2 July 2014	Liberal Democrats	Labour
Embsay-with-Eastby by-election	31 March 2016	Conservative	Independent
Aire Valley with Lothersdale by-election	4 May 2017	Conservative	Green
Barden Fell by-election	6 May 2021	Independent	Independent
Penyghent by-election	6 May 2021	Conservative	Conservative
