= Kirkby Malham =

Village and civil parish in North Yorkshire, England

Coordinates: 54°02′42″N 2°09′42″W

- Village
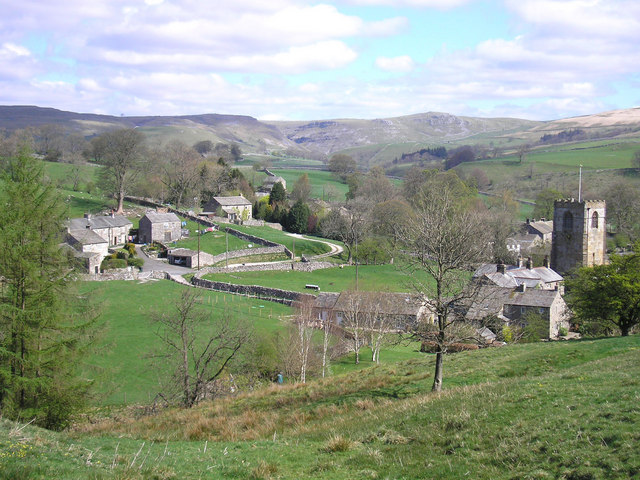
- Kirkby Malham looking towards Gordale Scar

- Location within North Yorkshire
- OS grid reference: SD894609
- Unitary authority: North Yorkshire
- Ceremonial county: North Yorkshire
- Region: Yorkshire and the Humber
- Country: England
- Sovereign state: United Kingdom
- Post town: SKIPTON
- Postcode district: BD23
- Police: North Yorkshire
- Fire: North Yorkshire
- Ambulance: Yorkshire

Kirkby Malham is a small village and civil parish in the county of North Yorkshire, England. It is in the Yorkshire Dales, 6 miles (9.7 km) east of Settle. The population of the civil parish as taken in the 2011 Census (including Hanlith and Scosthrop) was 202. Nearby settlements include Hanlith, Malham, Airton and Calton.

== History ==
Kirkby Malham was mentioned in the Domesday Book as being waste, but that the land belonged to Roger of Poitou. The name of the village derives from Old Norse, and means "the village with a church by the stony bank". The presence of the word Kirkby in front of the village name suggests that a church was here before the Domesday Survey; however, the Domesday Book makes no mention of a church.

Nearby settlements include Malham, just to the north; Hanlith, to the east by the River Aire; and Airton and Calton to the south. Kirkby Malham is 6 miles (9.7 km) east of Settle, and 9 miles (14 km) north of Skipton.

In 1606, John Topham founded a grammar school in Kirkby Malham for between twenty and thirty local children, which was described as having "moderate quarterages", although the classics were taught for free.

The village has just over 35 buildings, which include the parish church of St Michael's and Kirkby Malham Vicarage. The church was a Parliamentary garrison during the English Civil War and the parish register contains the signature of Oliver Cromwell who witnessed a marriage in the church in 1655 (he had been visiting John Lambert of nearby Calton). The school, Kirkby in Malhamdale United Voluntary Aided Primary School, is just to the north of the village and was rated as 'Good' by Ofsted in 2019.

== Governance ==
The area was part of the Deanery of Craven, within the wapentake of Staincliffe. The village was also known historically as Kirkby Malhamdale, and was in the West Riding of Yorkshire, part of the Settle Rural District, until the boundary changes of 1974. Between 1974 and 2023, it was part of the former Craven District of North Yorkshire, but was moved into the new unitary authority of North Yorkshire Council in April 2023. It is represented at Parliament as part of the Skipton and Ripon Constituency.

Kirkby Malham now has a grouped parish council, Kirkby Malhamdale Parish Council, with the parishes of Malham, Malham Moor and Hanlith.

Population of Kirkby Malham 1801–2015
1801	1811	1821	1831	1841	1851	1861	1871	1881	1891	1901	1911	1921	1931	1951	1961	1971	2001	2011	2015
167	175	204	219	195	139	128	174	145	107	106	118	113	103	55	65	71	202	202	170 (Note: Estimated population.)

== Notable people ==
- American writer Bill Bryson once resided in the village.
- Richard Dean, Anglican minister, was born and baptised in Kirkby Malham.
- Joan Hassall, English wood engraver and book illustrator, lived in Malham, but worshipped and played the organ in Kirkby Malham church.
- Walter Morrison, businessman and politician, was buried in Kirkby Malham churchyard.

== See also ==
- Listed buildings in Kirkby Malham
