= Kirkby Malham Vicarage =

Building in North Yorkshire, England

Coordinates: 54°02′41″N 2°09′50″W

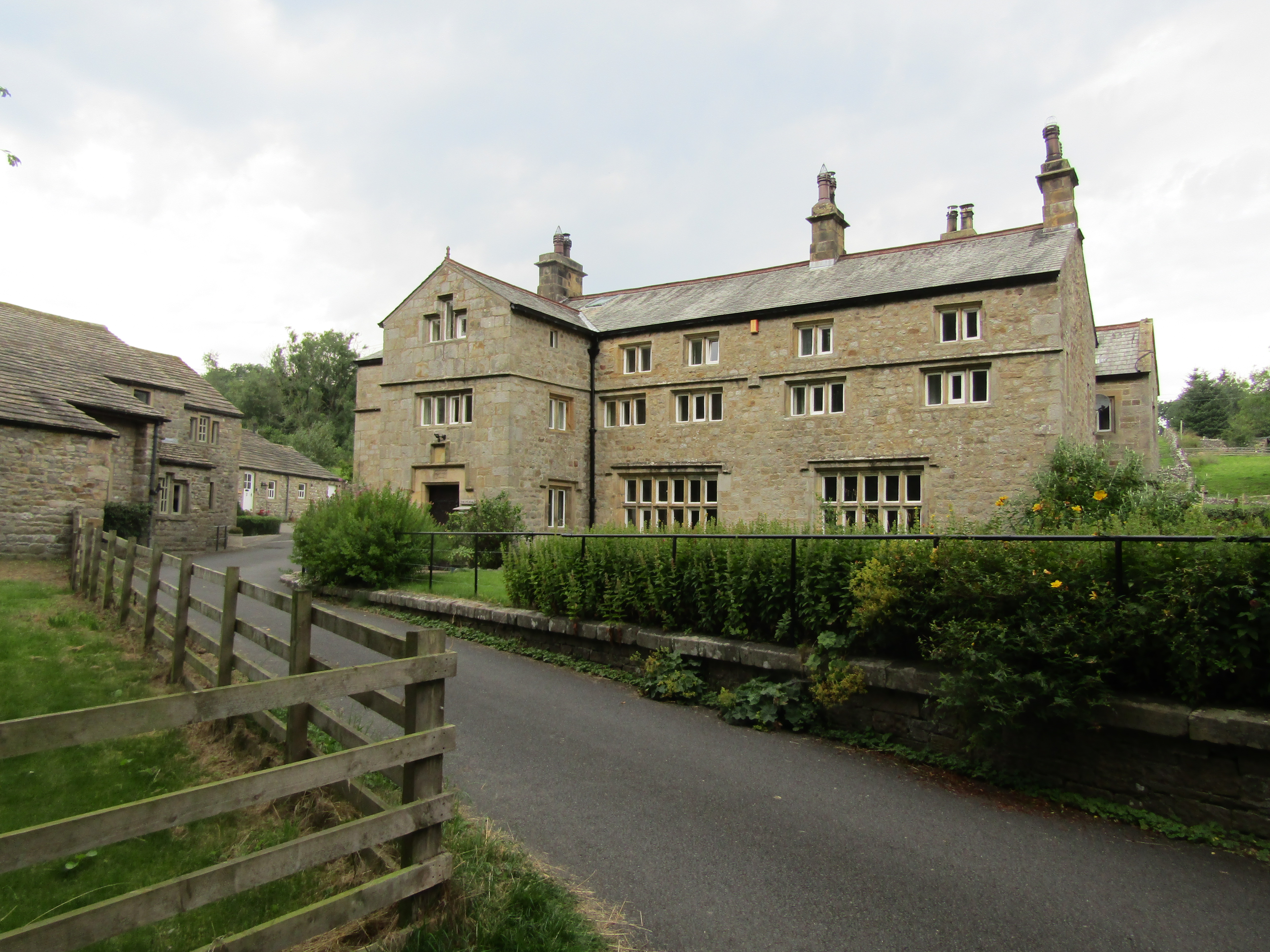
The building, in 2022

Kirkby Malham Vicarage is a historic building in Kirkby Malham, a village in North Yorkshire, in England.

The building was constructed in 1622, probably for the King family. It was initially known as "Church End House" or "Kirkby Malham Hall". By the mid-19th century it had been divided into three smaller properties, but in 1866 it was restored as a single property, the vicarage of St Michael's Church, Kirkby Malham. The work included removing the second floor, although its windows survive, lighting the first floor. A northeast wing was added in 1874, and in the early 20th century its ground floor was altered to provide garaging space. The building wsa again restored in 1985, following which the wing was largely disused, and in 2012 it was divided to become a separate house. The entire building was grade II listed in 1958.

The house is built of stone with a stone slate roof. It has two storeys and six bays, and in the second bay is a projecting gabled three-storey porch. The doorway has a moulded surround and a hood mould, and above it is a datestone. The windows are mullioned, some in the ground floor also with transoms, all have hood moulds, and between the upper two floors it is continuous. The window in the gable of the porch is stepped.

== See also ==
- Listed buildings in Kirkby Malham
