= 1999 Craven District Council election =

1999 UK local government election

The 1999 Craven District Council election took place on 6 May 1999 to elect members of Craven District Council in North Yorkshire, England. One third of the council was up for election and the Conservative Party gained overall control of the council from no overall control.

After the election, the composition of the council was:

- Conservative 19
- Independent 10
- Liberal Democrats 4
- Labour 1

== Background ==
After the last election in 1998 the Conservatives and Liberal Democrats both had 13 councillors, while Labour had 4 seats and there were 4 independents. However following the election five Liberal Democrat councillors, Janet Gott, Ken Hart, Joan Ibbotson, Steve Place and the council leader Carl Lis, all left the party to sit as independent councillors. One Labour councillor Andrew Rankine also became an independent at the same time.

Before the 1999 election the Conservatives needed to gain 5 of the 14 seats contested in order to gain a majority on the council. They made two gains when they were the only party to put up candidates in Cowling and Skipton Central wards, which had previously been held by Labour and the Liberal Democrats respectively. While the Conservatives stood a full slate of 14 candidates, the Labour party only stood one candidate at the council election, Janet Gordon in Skipton South.

== Election result ==
The results saw the Conservatives make a net gain of 6 seats to regain overall control of the council. The only Labour councillor defending her seat, Jan Gordon, was among those to be defeated, losing to Conservative Beryl Beresford.

Craven local election result 1999
| Party | Seats | Gains | Losses | Net gain/loss | Seats % | Votes % | Votes | +/− |
|---|---|---|---|---|---|---|---|---|
| Conservative | 9 | | | +6 | 64.3 | | | |
| Independent | 3 | | | 0 | 21.4 | | | |
| Liberal Democrats | 2 | | | -4 | 14.3 | | | |
| Labour | 0 | | | -2 | 0 | | | |

== By-elections between 1999 and 2000 ==
A by-election was held in Skipton East on 9 March 2000 after the death of independent councillor Janet Gott. The seat was held by independent Melvyn Seward with a majority of 58 votes over Labour candidate Michael Green.

Skipton East by-election 9 March 2000
| Party | Candidate | Votes | % | ±% |
|---|---|---|---|---|
| Independent | Melvyn Seward | 228 | 36.1 | −5.5 |
| Labour | Michael Green | 170 | 26.9 | +26.9 |
| Conservative | Christopher Harbron | 125 | 19.8 | −7.8 |
| Liberal Democrats | Mark Wheeler | 108 | 17.1 | −13.6 |
| Majority | | 58 | 9.2 | |
| Turnout | | 631 | 17 | |
| Independent hold | | Swing | | |
