= 2014 Craven District Council election =

2014 UK local government election

Map of the results of the 2014 Craven District Council election. Conservatives in blue and independents in light grey. Wards in dark grey were not contested in 2014.

The 2014 Craven District Council election took place on 22 May 2014 to elect members of Craven District Council in North Yorkshire, England. One third of the council was up for election and the Conservative party stayed in overall control of the council.

After the election, the composition of the council was as follows:

- Conservative 18
- Independent 9
- Liberal Democrats 2
- Vacant 1

== Background ==
After the last election in 2012 the Conservatives had a 2-seat majority with 16 councillors, compared to 10 independents and 4 Liberal Democrats. The Conservative majority was increased in 2013 when the independent councillor for Hellifield and Long Preston Chris Moorby joined the Conservatives. By the time of the 2014 election a further seat was vacant after the death of Liberal Democrat councillor Polly English, meaning that before the election the council had 17 Conservative, 9 independent and 3 Liberal Democrat councillors.

9 seats were contested in 2014 with no candidates from the Liberal Democrats standing, even in Aire Valley with Lothersdale where the Liberal Democrat councillor for the previous 12 years, Mark Wheeler stood down at the election. However Labour for the first time in many years put up candidates for all 9 seats contested, despite not holding any seats on the council before the election. The Conservatives stood in 8 seats, just not standing in Sutton-in-Craven against independent councillor, Stephen Place, who was allied with the Conservatives. Other candidates included a further two independents, including sitting councillor Philip Barrett, and one candidate from the UK Independence Party.

== Election result ==
Only one seat changed hands at the election with the Conservatives gaining a seat from the Liberal Democrats to have 18 councillors. The Conservative gain came in Aire Valley with Lothersdale where Patrick Mulligan picked up the seat vacated by Liberal Democrat Mark Wheeler to become the only new councillor after the election. This reduced the Liberal Democrats to 2 seats on the council, while there remained 9 independents and 1 seat was vacant in Skipton West.

Craven local election result 2014
Party	Seats	Gains	Losses	Net gain/loss	Seats %	Votes %	Votes	+/−
Conservative	7	1	0	+1	77.8	51.6	4,816	+1.5%
Independent	2	0	0	0	22.2	20.3	1,893	+6.1%
Labour	0	0	0	0	0	24.7	2,309	+8.3%
UKIP	0	0	0	0	0	3.4	318	+3.4%
Liberal Democrats	0	0	1	-1	0	0	0	-17.1%

== Ward results ==
Aire Valley with Lothersdale
Party	Candidate	Votes	%	±%
Conservative	Patrick Mulligan	738	61.9	−1.1
Labour	Alan Hickman	455	38.1	+1.1
Majority		283	23.7	−2.2
Turnout		1,193	41.7	+8.3
Conservative gain from Liberal Democrats		Swing		

Bentham
Party	Candidate	Votes	%	±%
Conservative	Linda Brockbank	814	69.9	+30.2
Labour	James Black	350	30.1	+30.1
Majority		464	39.9	
Turnout		1,164	22.1	−25.0
Conservative hold		Swing		

Gargrave and Malhamdale
Party	Candidate	Votes	%	±%
Conservative	Alan Sutcliffe	715	71.8	+6.2
Labour	John Pope	281	28.2	+3.2
Majority		434	43.6	+3.0
Turnout		996	40.6	−15.0
Conservative hold		Swing		

Glusburn
Party	Candidate	Votes	%	±%
Independent	Philip Barrett	726	57.5	−2.5
UKIP	Roger Baxandall	318	25.2	+25.2
Labour	Hazel Keirle	110	8.7	−9.0
Conservative	Tanya Graham	109	8.6	−13.7
Majority		408	32.3	−5.4
Turnout		1,263	41.2	−2.1
Independent hold		Swing		

Hellifield and Long Preston
Party	Candidate	Votes	%	±%
Conservative	Robert Moorby	500	72.3	+24.1
Labour	Brian Parsons	192	27.7	+27.7
Majority		308	44.5	
Turnout		692	39.0	−14.5
Conservative hold		Swing		

Ingleton and Clapham
Party	Candidate	Votes	%	±%
Conservative	Carl Lis	759	58.9	−15.8
Independent	Anthony Macaulay	339	26.3	+26.3
Labour	Christine Rose	191	14.8	+14.8
Majority		420	32.6	−16.8
Turnout		1,289	41.2	+6.0
Conservative hold		Swing		

Penyghent
Party	Candidate	Votes	%	±%
Conservative	Richard Welch	430	69.8	+8.5
Labour	Katherine Lloyd	186	30.2	+30.2
Majority		244	39.6	+17.1
Turnout		616	42.9	−32.5
Conservative hold		Swing		

Settle and Ribblebanks
Party	Candidate	Votes	%	±%
Conservative	David Staveley	751	68.2	+1.7
Labour	Peter Madeley	350	31.8	−1.7
Majority		401	36.4	+3.3
Turnout		1,101	38.0	+2.4
Conservative hold		Swing		

Sutton-In-Craven
Party	Candidate	Votes	%	±%
Independent	Stephen Place	828	81.0	+4.8
Labour	Vivien Thompson	194	19.0	−4.8
Majority		634	62.0	+9.6
Turnout		1,022	35.2	−5.2
Independent hold		Swing		

== By-elections between 2014 and 2015 ==
A by-election was held in Skipton West on 2 July 2014 after the death of Liberal Democrat councillor Polly English. The seat was gained for Labour by Peter Madeley with a majority of 42 votes over Liberal Democrat Edward Walker. The victory meant Peter Madeley became the first Labour councillor on Craven council since 1999.

Skipton West by-election 2 July 2014
Party	Candidate	Votes	%	±%
Labour	Peter Madeley	185	24.0	+3.0
Liberal Democrats	Edward Walker	143	18.5	−18.0
Conservative	Tim Hudson-Brunt	131	17.0	−3.5
UKIP	Roger Baxendall	126	16.3	+16.3
Independent	Bernard Clarke	120	15.5	−6.5
Green	John Launder	67	8.7	+8.7
Majority		42	5.4	
Turnout		772	25.3	−9.3
Labour gain from Liberal Democrats		Swing		
