= 2002 Craven District Council election =

Local government election in Craven, North Yorkshire, England

Map of the results of the 2002 Craven District Council election. Conservatives in blue, Liberal Democrats in yellow and independents in light grey.

The 2002 Craven District Council election took place on 2 May 2002 to elect members of Craven District Council in North Yorkshire, England. The whole council was up for election with boundary changes since the last election in 2000 reducing the number of seats by 4. The council stayed under no overall control.

== Background ==
Before the election the Conservatives had exactly half of the seats on the council with 17 councillors, compared to 12 Independents and 5 Liberal Democrats. Due to boundary changes, which reduced the number of seats on the council from 34 to 30, the whole council was elected for the first time since 1974, instead of the usual one-third of the council being elected at each election.

A total of 61 candidates stood for the 30 seats contested, comprising 23 Conservatives, 18 independents, 13 Liberal Democrats and 1 candidate from the Labour Party. 3 Conservative and 3 independent candidates were elected unopposed.

== Election result ==
The Conservatives won the most seats to have 13 councillors but without a majority. The Liberal Democrats made gains to have 9 seats, while independents took 8 seats.

Craven local election result 2002
Party	Seats	Gains	Losses	Net gain/loss	Seats %	Votes %	Votes	+/−
Conservative	13			-4	43.3	40.1	8,363	
Liberal Democrats	9			+4	30.0	28.1	5,864	
Independent	8			-4	26.7	30.9	6,430	
Labour	0			0	0	0.9	184	

== Ward results ==
Aire Valley with Lothersdale (2 seats)
Party	Candidate	Votes	%	±%
Liberal Democrats	Mark Wheeler	552		
Conservative	Patricia Fairbank	480		
Conservative	Robert Greaves	410		
Turnout		1,442	37.2	

Barden Fell
Party	Candidate	Votes	%	±%
Conservative	Christopher Knowles-Fitton	474	64.2	
Independent	Robert Heseltine	264	35.8	
Majority		210	28.4	
Turnout		738	57.2	

Bentham (2 seats)
Party	Candidate	Votes	%	±%
Liberal Democrats	John Pilkington	741		
Conservative	Gerald Hurtley	488		
Independent	Manuel Camacho	439		
Turnout		1,668	39.9	

Cowling
Party	Candidate	Votes	%	±%
Independent	John Alderson	unopposed		

Embsay with Eastby
Party	Candidate	Votes	%	±%
Conservative	John Quinn	unopposed		

Gargrave and Malhamdale (2 seats)
Party	Candidate	Votes	%	±%
Conservative	Stephen Butcher	656		
Conservative	David Crawford	563		
Liberal Democrats	Andrew Wood	451		
Independent	Carlton Hayes	393		
Turnout		2,063	51.9	

Glusburn (2 seats)
Party	Candidate	Votes	%	±%
Independent	Philip Barrett	1,066		
Independent	Peter Seward	364		
Independent	Arthur Dixon	335		
Conservative	Ian Bannister	229		
Conservative	Jennifer Wood	194		
Turnout		2,188	43.3	

Grassington
Party	Candidate	Votes	%	±%
Conservative	Peter Walbank	unopposed		

Hellifield and Long Preston
Party	Candidate	Votes	%	±%
Conservative	Helen Firth	unopposed		

Ingleton and Clapham (2 seats)
Party	Candidate	Votes	%	±%
Independent	David Ireton	unopposed		
Independent	Carl Lis	unopposed		

Penyghent
Party	Candidate	Votes	%	±%
Conservative	Richard Welch	393	54.7	
Independent	Anthony Macaulay	326	45.3	
Majority		67	9.3	
Turnout		719	51.2	

Settle and Ribblebanks (2 seats)
Party	Candidate	Votes	%	±%
Liberal Democrats	David Heather	652		
Liberal Democrats	Elizabeth Graham	599		
Conservative	Charles Price	392		
Conservative	Terence Murray	383		
Turnout		2,026	39.1	

Skipton East (2 seats)
Party	Candidate	Votes	%	±%
Liberal Democrats	Eric Jaquin	342		
Conservative	Pamela Heseltine	333		
Conservative	Christopher Harbron	303		
Independent	Melvin Seward	268		
Liberal Democrats	Darren Moorby	245		
Independent	Dennis Hall	204		
Labour	Duncan Hall	184		
Turnout		1,879	36.5	

Skipton North (2 seats)
Party	Candidate	Votes	%	±%
Liberal Democrats	Michael Doyle	570		
Conservative	Marcia Turner	569		
Conservative	Paul Whitaker	512		
Independent	Michael Hill	416		
Turnout		2,067	42.2	

Skipton South (2 seats)
Party	Candidate	Votes	%	±%
Liberal Democrats	Andrew Solloway	325		
Independent	Frances Cook	295		
Independent	Andrew Cook	252		
Conservative	Alex Bentley	181		
Conservative	Barry Blood	177		
Turnout		1,230	25.4	

Skipton West (2 seats)
Party	Candidate	Votes	%	±%
Liberal Democrats	Paul English	575		
Liberal Democrats	Pauline English	569		
Conservative	Margaret Spence	279		
Conservative	Norman Spence	261		
Turnout		1,684	30.2	

Sutton-in-Craven (2 seats)
Party	Candidate	Votes	%	±%
Independent	Stephen Place	778		
Independent	Kenneth Hart	585		
Conservative	Barbara Barwick-Nicholson	216		
Conservative	Dee Pollitt	122		
Turnout		1,701	35.9	

Upper Wharfedale
Party	Candidate	Votes	%	±%
Conservative	John Sayer	481	58.4	
Independent	Kenneth Luty	233	28.3	
Liberal Democrats	James Monksfield	109	13.2	
Majority		248	30.1	
Turnout		823	53.2	

West Craven
Party	Candidate	Votes	%	±%
Conservative	John Binns	267	43.6	
Independent	Robert Mason	212	34.6	
Liberal Democrats	Andrew Rankine	134	21.9	
Majority		55	9.0	
Turnout		613	43.6	
