= Richard Dean (curate) =

English minister and writer (c. 1727–1778)

The Reverend Richard Dean
- Born: c. 1727; Kirkby Malham, Yorkshire, England
- Died: 8 February 1778; Middleton, England
- Occupations: Minister, writer
- Notable work: An Essay on the Future Life of Brutes (1768)

Richard Dean (c. 1727 – 8 February 1778) was an English Anglican minister and early animal rights writer.

== Biography ==
Dean was born in Kirkby Malham, Yorkshire, around 1727. In addition to being an Anglican minister, Dean was schoolmaster of Middleton grammar school. He was first curate of Royton Chapel and curate of Middleton.

Dean is best known for his two volume book, An Essay on the Future Life of Brutes, which argued for animal rights and a future existence (afterlife) for animals from the Bible. He argued that animal immortality followed logically and morally from animal sentience. Dean believed that animals had a sentient principle or soul and that and a loving God would not have created animals subject to pain if he had not intended to compensate their suffering with a future existence.

Dean argued against the Cartesian view that animals were mere machines. He argued for animal intelligence and asserted that animals live and suffer as humans do. He believed that this implied that man has a moral responsibility to animals. During his time not many writers held this view; however, Dean did acknowledge the work of John Hildrop.

Dean died in Middleton on 8 February 1778.

== Publications ==
- An Essay on the Future Life of Brutes (two volumes, 1768)

== See also ==
- Christianity and animal rights
- History of animal rights
