= Hanlith =

Village and civil parish in North Yorkshire, England

Coordinates: 54.047560°N 2.151970°W

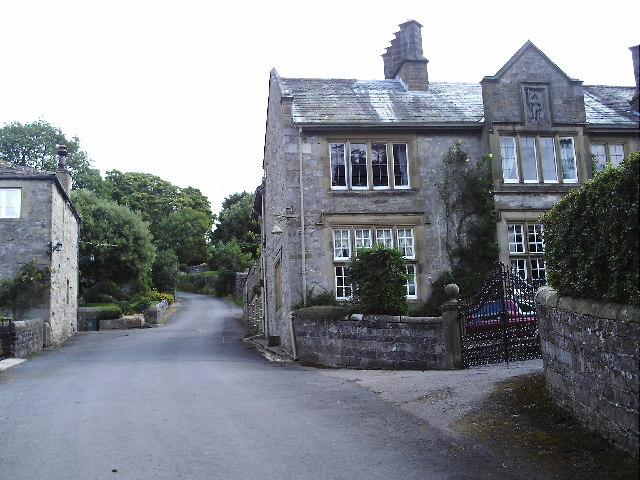
- Hanlith, the 17th century but much modified Hanlith Hall on the right

- Location within North Yorkshire
- Population: 40
- OS grid reference: SD901612
- Civil parish: Hanlith
- Unitary authority: North Yorkshire
- Ceremonial county: North Yorkshire
- Region: Yorkshire and the Humber
- Country: England
- Sovereign state: United Kingdom
- Post town: SKIPTON
- Postcode district: BD23
- Police: North Yorkshire
- Fire: North Yorkshire
- Ambulance: Yorkshire

Hanlith is a small village and civil parish in the county of North Yorkshire, England. It is situated near Kirkby Malham and the tourist attraction of Malham Cove. It is about 10 miles (16 km) north west of Skipton, and consists of only 13 houses. Its population was estimated at 40 in 2015.

Hanlith has a joint parish council, Kirkby Malhamdale Parish Council, with the parishes of Malham, Kirkby Malham and Malham Moor.

== History ==
Hanlith dates back as a manor to the Domesday Book of 1086 when it was spelt Hangelif. The name is of Old Norse origin, from the personal name Hagne and hlíð, meaning "slope", so means "Hagne's slope". The reference is to the steep hillside east of the River Aire.

Hanlith Hall belonged to the Dehelington and Medcalfe families until about 1347, and then became tenanted to the Serjeantson family who remained there for 550 years. The Hall was remodelled in the 20th century.

Hanlith was historically a township in the ancient parish of Kirkby Malham in the West Riding of Yorkshire. It became a civil parish in 1866, and in 1974 was transferred to the new county of North Yorkshire. From 1974 to 2023 it was part of the Craven District, it is now administered by the unitary North Yorkshire Council.

== See also ==
- Listed buildings in Hanlith
