= Listed buildings in Calton, North Yorkshire =

Calton is a civil parish in the county of North Yorkshire, England. It contains nine listed buildings that are recorded in the National Heritage List for England. All the listed buildings are designated at Grade II, the lowest of the three grades, which is applied to "buildings of national importance and special interest". The parish contains the village of Calton and the surrounding countryside. Apart from a bridge over the River Aire, all the listed buildings are in the village, and consist of houses, farmhouses, farm buildings and a cottage.

== Buildings ==
Name and location	Photograph	Date	Notes
Glendower House; 54.02900°N 2.14033°W	—	Early 17th century	The house is in stone with a stone slate roof. There are two storeys, three bays, and a later outshut. On the left gable is a porch containing a doorway with a plain surround, a lintel with moulding, and a cornice. Most of the windows have chamfered surrounds and moulded mullions, and some have hood moulds, and there is a single-light window with a semicircular head.
Calton Lodge; 54.02805°N 2.14350°W	—	17th century	The house is in stone with shaped eaves modillions and a stone slate roof. There are two storeys and three bays. The doorway has an ogee moulded surround, and a decorated initialled lintel. There is one casement window, a three-light chamfered mullioned window at the rear, and the other windows are sashes, some with mullions.
Nelson Farmhouse; 54.02905°N 2.14008°W	—	17th century	The oldest part is the rear wing, with the garden range added in the 18th century. The farmhouse is in stone with a stone slate roof, two storeys and a rear wing. The central doorway has a plain surround with a stepped base, a pulvinated frieze, and a moulded cornice. The ground floor windows are mullioned and transomed, and the upper floor windows are mullioned. In the rear wing is a 17th-century double-chamfered three-light mullioned window and a 17th-century hood.
The Rookery; 54.02829°N 2.14297°W	—	Late 17th century	The house is in stone, with painted stone dressings, and a slate roof with stone slate at the rear. There are two storeys, three bays, and a rear outshut. The central doorway has a Gibbs surround, a lintel with a carved keystone, and a cornice. The windows are double-chamfered and mullioned, and contain casements.
Manor Farmhouse; 54.02921°N 2.14062°W	—	Mid to late 18th century	The house is in stone, with shaped eaves modillions, and a stone slate roof with broad coping stones. There are two storeys and three bays. The central doorway has a moulded surround, a rectangular fanlight and a cornice. The windows are sashes, those in the left bay with two lights and mullions. In the right return is a doorway with a re-set 17-century surround and a basket-arched decorated lintel.
Airton Bridge; 54.02887°N 2.14829°W		Early 19th century (probable)	The bridge carries Calton Lane over the River Aire. It is in stone, and consists of a low segmental arch and a smaller round arch. The pier has a cutwater and pilasters, and the bridge has abutments and solid parapets.
Calton Hall, walls, gate piers and mounting block 54.02769°N 2.14259°W		Early 19th century	The house, which retains earlier material, is in stone, and has a stone slate roof with coped and shaped kneelers to the gable. There are two storeys, three bays, and an extension to the right with a catslide roof. The doorway has a pointed arch and a chamfered surround. Most of the windows are mullioned, some mullions are missing, and on the garden front are two two-storey canted bay windows. To the west is a garden wall containing an entrance flanked by gate piers, each with a moulded cornice and a ball finial. The right pier has been cut to take the first two steps of a four-step mounting block.
Glendower Cottage; 54.02907°N 2.14025°W	—	19th century	The cottage is in stone with a stone slate roof. There are two storeys, one bay, and a single-storey outshut. The doorway has a plain surround and lintel, the large window contains sashes, and there are no windows in the upper floor.
Stables and storehouse, Calton Hall; 54.02770°N 2.14210°W	—	Mid to late 19th century	The buildings are in stone, and have roofs of stone slate, the stable roof with coped gables, shaped kneelers, and ball finials. The stable has two storeys and two bays, and shaped eaves modillions. It contains two wagon entrances with chamfered surrounds and massive lintels with segmental-pointed heads, and in the upper floor are mullioned windows. The storehouse has one storey and two bays, and contains two entrances with chamfered surrounds and segmental heads, and a pitching hole.
