= 2004 Craven District Council election =

2004 UK local government election

Map of the results of the 2004 Craven District Council election. Conservatives in blue, Liberal Democrats in yellow and independents in light grey. Wards in dark grey were not contested in 2004.

The 2004 Craven District Council election took place on 10 June 2004 to elect members of Craven District Council in North Yorkshire, England. One third of the council was up for election and the council stayed under no overall control.

After the election, the composition of the council was as follows:

- Conservative 13
- Independent 11
- Liberal Democrats 6

== Background ==
After the last election in 2003, the Conservatives had 11 seats, compared to 10 for independents and 9 Liberal Democrats. However, in November 2003 an independent candidate gained a seat from the Liberal Democrats at a by-election in Bentham.

At the 2004 election two long serving councillors stood down, Beth Graham from Settle and Ribblesbanks ward, who had been a councillor since 1976, and Peter Walbank of Grassington ward. Candidates at the election included the first Labour Party candidate for a few years, James Black in Skipton South, while the Green Party also stood a candidate in Aire Valley with Lothersdale.

== Election result ==
The Conservatives gained 2 seats at the election to have 13 councillors, compared to 11 independents and 6 Liberal Democrats. Overall turnout at the election reached 50% after being held with all postal voting, only 9% below the turnout nationally at the 2001 general election, with the high turnout leading to a delay in the counting of the results.

Craven local election result 2004
Party	Seats	Gains	Losses	Net gain/loss	Seats %	Votes %	Votes	+/−
Conservative	6	2	0	+2	54.5	41.6	5,549	-4.1%
Liberal Democrats	3	0	2	-2	27.3	29.9	3,982	+5.6%
Independent	2	0	0	0	18.2	24.9	3,318	-5.1%
Green	0	0	0	0	0	2.1	285	+2.1%
Labour	0	0	0	0	0	1.5	204	+1.5%

== Ward results ==
Aire Valley with Lothersdale
Party	Candidate	Votes	%	±%
Conservative	Patricia Fairbank	725	52.7	
Liberal Democrats	John Manley	365	26.5	
Green	John Akroyd	285	20.7	
Majority		360	26.2	
Turnout		1,375	51.7	+14.5
Conservative hold		Swing		

Barden Fell
Party	Candidate	Votes	%	±%
Conservative	Christopher Knowles-Fitton	414	51.2	−13.0
Independent	Cecil Hammond	302	37.3	+1.5
Liberal Democrats	Darren Moorby	93	11.5	+11.5
Majority		112	13.9	−14.5
Turnout		809	59.9	+2.7
Conservative hold		Swing		

Cowling
Party	Candidate	Votes	%	±%
Independent	John Alderson	374	45.1	
Independent	Alan Perrow	316	38.1	
Conservative	Geoffrey Dunn	140	16.9	
Majority		58	7.0	
Turnout		830	50.1	
Independent hold		Swing		

Grassington
Party	Candidate	Votes	%	±%
Conservative	Richard Foster	616	73.2	
Liberal Democrats	Andrew Rankine	225	26.8	
Majority		391	46.5	
Turnout		841	65.4	
Conservative hold		Swing		

Ingleton and Clapham
Party	Candidate	Votes	%	±%
Independent	David Ireton	1,403	81.9	
Conservative	Alex Bentley	310	18.1	
Majority		1,093	63.8	
Turnout		1,713	56.9	
Independent hold		Swing		

Settle and Ribblebanks
Party	Candidate	Votes	%	±%
Conservative	Donald Whaites	740	50.5	
Liberal Democrats	Ronald Graveson	726	49.5	
Majority		14	1.0	
Turnout		1,466	53.3	+14.2
Conservative gain from Liberal Democrats		Swing		

Skipton East
Party	Candidate	Votes	%	±%
Liberal Democrats	Eric Jaquin	728	51.1	+24.3
Conservative	Christopher Harbron	697	48.9	+17.4
Majority		31	2.2	
Turnout		1,425	52.0	
Liberal Democrats hold		Swing		

Skipton North
Party	Candidate	Votes	%	±%
Conservative	Paul Whitaker	679	41.7	−14.7
Liberal Democrats	Michael Doyle	549	33.7	−9.9
Independent	John Kerwin-Davey	399	24.5	+24.5
Majority		130	8.0	−4.9
Turnout		1,627	59.7	
Conservative gain from Liberal Democrats		Swing		

Skipton South
Party	Candidate	Votes	%	±%
Liberal Democrats	Andrew Solloway	501	44.8	+44.8
Conservative	Kenneth Creek	224	20.0	+4.7
Labour	James Black	204	18.2	+18.2
Independent	Dennis Hall	190	17.0	−40.5
Majority		277	24.8	
Turnout		1,119	41.5	
Liberal Democrats hold		Swing		

Skipton West
Party	Candidate	Votes	%	±%
Liberal Democrats	Paul English	795	65.3	−1.7
Conservative	Norman Spence	423	34.7	+1.7
Majority		372	30.5	−3.5
Turnout		1,218	43.0	
Liberal Democrats hold		Swing		

Upper Wharfedale
Party	Candidate	Votes	%	±%
Conservative	John Sayer	581	63.5	+5.1
Independent	Kenneth Luty	334	36.5	+8.2
Majority		247	27.0	−3.1
Turnout		915	61.1	+7.9
Conservative hold		Swing		

== By-elections between 2004 and 2006 ==
Upper Wharfedale by-election 2 March 2006
Party	Candidate	Votes	%	±%
Conservative	Julia Mulligan	394	54.7	−8.8
Independent		326	45.3	+8.8
Majority		68	9.4	−17.6
Turnout		720	47.0	−14.1
Conservative hold		Swing		
