= Listed buildings in Hanlith =

Hanlith is a civil parish in the county of North Yorkshire, England. It contains three listed buildings that are recorded in the National Heritage List for England. All the listed buildings are designated at Grade II, the lowest of the three grades, which is applied to "buildings of national importance and special interest". The parish contains the village of Hanlith and the surrounding countryside, and the listed buildings consist of a bridge, a farmhouse and a barn.

== Buildings ==
Name and location	Photograph	Date	Notes
Hanlith Hall Farmhouse; 54.04715°N 2.15241°W	—	17th century	The farmhouse is in stone with a slate roof. There are two storeys, the garden front has four bays, and the rear faces the road. On the garden front is a porch, and the doorway has a plain surround. Most of the windows are double-chamfered and mullioned, with some mullions missing, and some have hood moulds.
Hanlith Bridge; 54.04629°N 2.15457°W		18th century	The bridge carries Green Gate over the River Aire, and it was widened in the 19th century. The bridge is in stone and consists of a single segmental arch. The parapet and wings have stone coping.
Hellenstead Barn; 54.04780°N 2.14685°W	—	18th century (probable)	The barn, which has been extensively rebuilt, is in stone with a stone slate roof. Above the entrance on the left is a re-set decorated and carved 17th-century lintel which has been moved from elsewhere.
