= Listed buildings in Kirkby Malham =

Kirkby Malham is a civil parish in the county of North Yorkshire, England. It contains twelve listed buildings that are recorded in the National Heritage List for England. Of these, one is listed at Grade I, the highest of the three grades, and the others are at Grade II, the lowest grade. The parish contains the village of Kirkby Malham and the surrounding area. Most of the listed buildings are in the village, and consist of a church. houses and a telephone kiosk, and away from the village is a milestone.

== Key ==
Grade	Criteria
I	Buildings of exceptional interest, sometimes considered to be internationally important
II	Buildings of national importance and special interest

== Buildings ==
Name and location	Photograph	Date	Notes	Grade
St Michael's Church; 54.04489°N 2.16330°W		15th century	The church, which was restored in 1879–80 by Paley and Austin, is built in millstone grit, with lead roofs on the aisles, and slate on the nave and chancel. It consists of a nave with a clerestory, north and south aisles with chapels, a chancel, a north hearse house with a stone slate roof, and a west tower. The tower has two stages, diagonal buttresses, a three-light west window with a hood mould, a niche and an initialled plaque on the south side, clock faces on east and west sides, three-light bell openings with a continuous hood mould, and an embattled parapet. The west part of the nave also has an embattled parapet, and the east window has five lights.	I
Vicarage; 54.04478°N 2.16395°W		1622	The house, which was extended in 1866, is in stone with a stone slate roof. There are three storeys and six bays, and in the second bay is a projecting gabled three-storey porch. The doorway has a moulded surround and a hood mould, and above it is a datestone. The windows are mullioned, some in the ground floor also with transoms, all have hood moulds, and between the upper two floors it is continuous. The window in the gable of the porch is stepped.	II
Yeomans Cottage; 54.04470°N 2.16090°W	—	1637	The house is in limewashed stone with stone dressings and a stone slate roof. There are two storeys and two bays. The doorway has a chamfered surround, a basket-arched lintel and a hood mould. Most of the windows are mullioned, with some mullions missing. Inside, there is an inglenook fireplace with voussoirs.	II
Rose Cottage; 54.04523°N 2.16217°W		17th century	The house is in stone with a stone slate roof. There are two storeys and three bays. The doorway has a plain surround, and is flanked by three-light mullioned windows, the middle light stepped up. The window in the right bay of the upper floor is similar, and the other windows are sashes.	II
The Rookery; 54.04590°N 2.16165°W	—	Late 17th century	The house, which was later extended, is in stone with a stone slate roof. There are two storeys and two bays, and a later slightly projecting single-bay extension on the left. The doorway has a plain surround and a pediment on brackets, and to the left is the original doorway with a moulded surround, later blocked with an inserted window. The windows on the front are sashes, and at the rear are mullioned windows. The extension has a band and modillion eaves. Inside, there is a massive inglenook fireplace.	II
Church End Farmhouse and Cottage; 54.04558°N 2.16453°W	—	18th century	The farmhouse and cottage are in stone with slate roofs, and two storeys. The farmhouse has four bays, and various windows, one mullioned, and a doorway with a plain surround. The cottage on the left has two bays, a doorway with a cornice, and sash windows.	II
Lamberts Halt; 54.04517°N 2.16245°W	—	18th century	The house is limewashed, with stone dressings and a stone slate roof. There are two storeys and two bays, and a parallel two-storey one-bay extension on the left. The doorway is in the gable end facing the street, and has a chamfered surround and a basket-arched head. Most of the windows are mullioned, and there are later casements.	II
Milestone; 54.04945°N 2.17598°W		18th century	The milestone on the south side of Grains Lane is in millstone grit, and is about 60 centimetres (24 in) high. It has a rounded top, and is inscribed with the distances to Settle and Kirkby Malham.	II
Tarka; 54.04576°N 2.16241°W		18th century	The house is in limewashed stone, with stone dressings, eaves modillions, and a stone slate roof with stone coping and kneelers at the front. There are two storeys and three bays. The doorway has plain jambs with square bases and impost blocks, and a porch with coped gables on kneelers. Above the doorway is a sash window, and the other windows are mullioned with three lights.	II
West Bank Farm; 54.04628°N 2.16268°W	—	Mid 18th century	The house is in stone with a stone slate roof, two storeys and four bays. The doorway has a moulded surround, a beaded frieze and a moulded cornice. In the right gable end is a porch containing a doorway with a chamfered surround, a beaded frieze and a basket-arched initialled and dated lintel. Most of the windows on the front are mullioned and transomed, in the right bay are 19th-century windows, and at the rear is a full height stair window. Inside, there is an inglenook fireplace with massive voussoirs.	II
Clock Cottage; 54.04543°N 2.16471°W	—	Late 18th century	The house is in stone with eaves modillions and a stone slate roof. There are two storeys and two bays. The main doorway has square jambs and impost blocks, and to the right is a blocked doorway with a massive dated lintel. The windows are mullioned, with three lights at the front and two at the rear.	II
Telephone kiosk 54.04511°N 2.16219°W		1935	The K6 type telephone kiosk in Main Street was designed by Giles Gilbert Scott. Constructed in cast iron with a square plan and a dome, it has three unperforated crowns in the top panels.	II
