= 2016 Craven District Council election =

2016 UK local government election

Map of the results

The 2016 Craven District Council election took place on 5 May 2016 to elect members of Craven District Council in England. This was on the same day as other local elections.

== Ward results ==
=== Aire Valley with Lothersdale ===
Aire Valley with Lothersdale 2016
Party	Candidate	Votes	%	±%
Conservative	Patricia Fairbank	511	44.5	
Green	Andy Brown	346	30.1	
Labour	Paul Arthur Routledge	291	25.3	
Majority		165	14.3	
Conservative hold		Swing		

=== Barden Fell ===
Barden Fell 2016
Party	Candidate	Votes	%	±%
Conservative	Gill Quinn	248	36.4	
Green	Andrew Frank Garrick	78	11.4	
Independent	David Pighills	355	52.1	
Majority		107	15.7	
Independent gain from Conservative		Swing		

=== Cowling ===
Cowling 2016
Party	Candidate	Votes	%	±%
Labour	Bill Mercer	209	31.7	
Independent	Ady Green	164	24.8	
UKIP	Alan Perrow	153	23.2	
Conservative	Andrew Charles Mallinson	133	20.1	
Majority		45	6.8	
Labour gain from Conservative		Swing		

=== Grassington ===
Grassington 2016
Party	Candidate	Votes	%	±%
Conservative	Richard William Foster	469	76.1	
Labour	Joe Lawrence Dillon	147	23.8	
Majority		322	52.2	
Conservative hold		Swing		

=== Ingleton and Clapham ===
Ingleton and Clapham 2016
Party	Candidate	Votes	%	±%
Conservative	David Lloyd Ireton	812	67.7	
Green	Sarah Wiltshire	387	32.2	
Majority		425	35.4	
Conservative hold		Swing		

=== Settle and Ribblebanks ===
Settle and Ribblebanks 2016
Party	Candidate	Votes	%	±%
Conservative	Wendy Virginia Hull	463	41.9	
Labour	David Robert Pemberton	356	32.2	
Green	Jo Rhodes	285	25.8	
Majority		107	9.7	
Conservative hold		Swing		

=== Skipton East ===
Skipton East 2016
Party	Candidate	Votes	%	±%
Liberal Democrats	Eric Jaquin	311	28.2	
Conservative	Wendy Elizabeth Clark	275	24.9	
Independent	Martin Emmerson	274	24.8	
Labour	Tania Brown	138	12.5	
Green	David Christopher Noland	104	9.4	
Majority		36	3.2	
Liberal Democrats hold		Swing		

=== Skipton North ===
Skipton North 2016
Party	Candidate	Votes	%	±%
Conservative	Paul Whitaker	304	24.5	
Liberal Democrats	Wendy Ann Leach	278	22.4	
Independent	John Kerwin-Davey	264	21.3	
Green	Claire Nash	252	20.3	
Labour	John Edward Pope	142	11.5	
Majority		26	3.1	
Conservative hold		Swing		

=== Skipton South ===
Skipton South 2016
Party	Candidate	Votes	%	±%
Independent	Andy Solloway	479	61.0	
Labour	Alan Frank Hickman	305	38.9	
Majority		174	22.1	
Independent hold		Swing		

=== Skipton West ===
Skipton West 2016
Party	Candidate	Votes	%	±%
Labour	Christine Vivien Forbes Rose	385	39.5	
Conservative	Chris Clark	308	31.6	
Liberal Democrats	Stephen Paul Walpole	184	18.9	
Green	Eleanor Hartley Smith	98	10.1	
Majority		77	7.9	
Labour hold		Swing		

=== Upper Wharfedale ===
Upper Wharfedale 2016
Party	Candidate	Votes	%	±%
Conservative	Tanya Ilsa Graham	529	73.1	
Labour	John Christopher Sutcliffe Vaughan	195	26.9	
Majority		334	46.1	
Conservative hold		Swing		

== By-elections between 2016 and 2018 ==
A by-election was held in Aire Valley with Lothersdale on 4 May 2017 after the resignation of Conservative councillor Patricia Fairbank. The seat was won by Green Party candidate Andrew Brown.

Aire Valley with Lothersdale by-election 4 May 2017
Party	Candidate	Votes	%	±%
Green	Andrew Brown	652	50.3	+20.2
Conservative	Gemma Harling	644	49.7	+5.2
Majority		8	0.6	
Turnout		1,296		
Green gain from Conservative		Swing		
