= 2007 Craven District Council election =

2007 UK local government election

Map of the results of the 2007 Craven District Council election. Independents in light grey, Conservatives in blue and Liberal Democrats in yellow. Wards in dark grey were not contested in 2007.

The 2007 Craven District Council election took place on 3 May 2007 to elect members of Craven District Council in North Yorkshire, England. One third (10 out of 30 seats) of the council was up for election and the council stayed under no overall control.

After the election, the composition of the council was:

- Conservative 13
- Independent 11
- Liberal Democrats 6

== Background ==
Before the election the council was run by an alliance between the 11 independents and the 6 Liberal Democrats, while the 13 Conservative councillors were in opposition. 10 seats were contested at the election with the Conservatives needing to make at least 2 gains to take control.

Candidates at the election included Conservative candidates in every ward, while there were no candidates from the Labour Party. The British National Party meanwhile stood their first candidate in an election for Craven council in Skipton South.

== Election result ==
There was no change to the party balance on the council, after the Conservatives gained a seat from an independent, but also lost a seat to another independent candidate. The Conservative gain came in Skipton South, where they defeated the vice-chairman of the council, Mike Hill, while they lost Bentham to an independent by 5 votes after 3 recounts.

Craven local election result 2007
| Party | Seats | Gains | Losses | Net gain/loss | Seats % | Votes % | Votes | +/− |
|---|---|---|---|---|---|---|---|---|
| Independent | 5 | 1 | 1 | 0 | 50.0 | 38.4 | 4,149 | +8.1 |
| Conservative | 4 | 1 | 1 | 0 | 40.0 | 45.1 | 4,866 | -0.3 |
| Liberal Democrats | 1 | 0 | 0 | 0 | 10.0 | 14.6 | 1,581 | -8.7 |
| BNP | 0 | 0 | 0 | 0 | 0.0 | 1.9 | 200 | +1.9 |

== Ward results ==
Bentham
| Party | Candidate | Votes | % | ±% |
|---|---|---|---|---|
| Independent | Lin Barrington | 686 | 50.2 | −7.4 |
| Conservative | Felicity Hey | 681 | 49.8 | +7.4 |
| Majority | | 5 | 0.4 | −14.7 |
| Turnout | | 1,367 | 46.5 | +5.2 |
| Independent gain from Conservative | | Swing | | |

Embsay with Eastby
| Party | Candidate | Votes | % | ±% |
|---|---|---|---|---|
| Conservative | Andy Quinn | 409 | 63.4 | −3.6 |
| Liberal Democrats | John Manley | 236 | 36.6 | +36.6 |
| Majority | | 173 | 26.8 | −7.2 |
| Turnout | | 645 | 45.7 | |
| Conservative hold | | Swing | | |

Gargrave and Malhamdale
| Party | Candidate | Votes | % | ±% |
|---|---|---|---|---|
| Conservative | David Crawford | 802 | 70.4 | +3.8 |
| Liberal Democrats | Stephen Walpole | 337 | 29.6 | −3.8 |
| Majority | | 465 | 40.8 | +7.6 |
| Turnout | | 1,139 | 47.1 | −0.5 |
| Conservative hold | | Swing | | |

Glusburn
| Party | Candidate | Votes | % | ±% |
|---|---|---|---|---|
| Independent | Graham Beck | 776 | 58.9 | −14.9 |
| Conservative | Jenny Wood | 541 | 41.1 | +14.9 |
| Majority | | 235 | 17.8 | −29.8 |
| Turnout | | 1,317 | 42.8 | +1.6 |
| Independent hold | | Swing | | |

Skipton East
| Party | Candidate | Votes | % | ±% |
|---|---|---|---|---|
| Conservative | Christopher Harbron | 610 | 53.9 | +5.0 |
| Independent | Michael Hill | 521 | 46.1 | +46.1 |
| Majority | | 89 | 7.9 | |
| Turnout | | 1,131 | 40.5 | −11.5 |
| Conservative gain from Independent | | Swing | | |

Skipton North
| Party | Candidate | Votes | % | ±% |
|---|---|---|---|---|
| Conservative | Marcia Turner | 577 | 42.0 | +0.3 |
| Independent | John Kerwin-Davey | 418 | 30.4 | +5.9 |
| Liberal Democrats | Andrew Rankine | 379 | 27.6 | −6.1 |
| Majority | | 159 | 11.6 | +3.6 |
| Turnout | | 1,374 | 50.0 | −9.7 |
| Conservative hold | | Swing | | |

Skipton South
| Party | Candidate | Votes | % | ±% |
|---|---|---|---|---|
| Independent | Robert Heseltine | 659 | 66.3 | +49.3 |
| BNP | Gary Beresford | 200 | 20.1 | +20.1 |
| Conservative | Robert Firth | 135 | 13.6 | −6.4 |
| Majority | | 459 | 46.2 | |
| Turnout | | 994 | 36.1 | −5.4 |
| Independent hold | | Swing | | |

Skipton West
| Party | Candidate | Votes | % | ±% |
|---|---|---|---|---|
| Liberal Democrats | Polly English | 629 | 61.9 | −3.4 |
| Conservative | Pamela Heseltine | 387 | 38.1 | +3.4 |
| Majority | | 242 | 23.8 | −6.7 |
| Turnout | | 1,016 | 35.4 | −7.6 |
| Liberal Democrats hold | | Swing | | |

Sutton-in-Craven
| Party | Candidate | Votes | % | ±% |
|---|---|---|---|---|
| Independent | Ken Hart | 687 | 64.9 | −1.1 |
| Conservative | David Harrison-Young | 372 | 35.1 | +1.1 |
| Majority | | 315 | 29.7 | −2.4 |
| Turnout | | 1,059 | 38.6 | −1.3 |
| Independent hold | | Swing | | |

West Craven
| Party | Candidate | Votes | % | ±% |
|---|---|---|---|---|
| Independent | Robert Mason | 402 | 53.3 | +2.5 |
| Conservative | Terry Thorpe | 352 | 46.7 | −2.5 |
| Majority | | 50 | 6.6 | +4.9 |
| Turnout | | 754 | 50.6 | |
| Independent hold | | Swing | | |

== By-elections between 2007 and 2008 ==
A by-election was held in Cowling on 12 July 2007 after independent councillor John Alderson resigned from the council after moving away from the area. The seat was gained for the Conservatives by Jan Ackroyd with a majority of 215 votes over Craven Ratepayers' Action Group candidate Alan Perrow.

Cowling by-election 12 July 2007
| Party | Candidate | Votes | % | ±% |
|---|---|---|---|---|
| Conservative | Jan Ackroyd | 351 | 64.3 | +47.4 |
| Craven Ratepayers' Action Group | Alan Perrow | 136 | 24.9 | −13.2 |
| Independent | Peter Seward | 59 | 10.8 | −34.3 |
| Majority | | 215 | 39.4 | |
| Turnout | | 546 | 31.2 | −18.9 |
| Conservative gain from Independent | | Swing | | |
