= 2019 Craven District Council election =

2019 UK local government election

The 2019 Craven District Council election took place on 2 May 2019 to elect members of Craven District Council in England.

== Results ==
| Party | Leader | Councillors | | | Votes | |
| Party | Leader | | Of total | | | Of total |
|---|---|---|---|---|---|---|
| Independents | Andrew Solloway | 5 | 45.5% | 9 / 30 | 2,823 | 28.0% |
| Conservative Party | Richard Foster | 4 | 36.4% | 15 / 30 | 2,796 | 27.7% |
| Labour | Peter Madeley | 1 | 9.1% | 3 / 30 | 2,060 | 20.4% |
| Green | Andrew Brown | 1 | 9.1% | 2 / 30 | 898 | 8.9% |
| UKIP | | 0 | 0.0% | 0 / 33 | 844 | 8.4% |
| Liberal Democrats | Eric Jaquin | 0 | 0.0% | 1 / 33 | 666 | 6.6% |

== Ward results ==
=== Bentham ===
Bentham
| Party | Candidate | Votes | % | ±% |
|---|---|---|---|---|
| Conservative | Stuart Handley | 397 | 37.1 | |
| Liberal Democrats | Mark Christie | 326 | 30.5 | |
| Labour | David Grace | 224 | 20.9 | |
| UKIP | Lynda Heath | 123 | 11.5 | |
| Majority | | | | |
| Turnout | | | 37.0 | |
| Conservative hold | | Swing | | |

=== Embsay with Eastby ===
Embsay with Eastby
| Party | Candidate | Votes | % | ±% |
|---|---|---|---|---|
| Independent | Brian Shuttleworth | 608 | 88.8 | |
| Labour | Bob Holland | 77 | 11.2 | |
| Majority | | | | |
| Turnout | | | 44.5 | |
| Independent gain from Conservative | | Swing | | |

=== Gargrave & Malhamdale ===
Gargrave & Malhamdale
| Party | Candidate | Votes | % | ±% |
|---|---|---|---|---|
| Conservative | Simon Myers | 698 | 70.9 | |
| Labour | Paula Derry | 287 | 29.1 | |
| Majority | | | | |
| Turnout | | | 39.7 | |
| Conservative hold | | Swing | | |

=== Glusburn ===
Glusburn
| Party | Candidate | Votes | % | ±% |
|---|---|---|---|---|
| Independent | Mark Wheeler | 621 | 59.1 | |
| UKIP | Roger Baxandall | 324 | 30.8 | |
| Labour | Paul Routledge | 106 | 10.1 | |
| Majority | | | | |
| Turnout | | | 33.9 | |
| Independent gain from UKIP | | Swing | | |

=== Skipton East ===
Skipton East
| Party | Candidate | Votes | % | ±% |
|---|---|---|---|---|
| Conservative | Chris Harbron | 403 | 38.5 | |
| Liberal Democrats | Matthew Pickard | 281 | 26.8 | |
| UKIP | Cheryl Hounslow | 202 | 19.3 | |
| Labour | Gerado Iannaccone | 161 | 15.4 | |
| Majority | | | | |
| Turnout | | | 36.9 | |
| Conservative hold | | Swing | | |

=== Skipton North ===
Skipton North
| Party | Candidate | Votes | % | ±% |
|---|---|---|---|---|
| Green | David Noland | 561 | 42.9 | |
| Conservative | John Dawson | 529 | 40.4 | |
| Labour | Adrian Lunn | 218 | 16.7 | |
| Majority | | | | |
| Turnout | | | 46.0 | |
| Green gain from Conservative | | Swing | | |

=== Skipton South ===
Skipton South
| Party | Candidate | Votes | % | ±% |
|---|---|---|---|---|
| Independent | Robert Heseltine | 401 | 51.9 | |
| Labour | Brian McDonald | 212 | 27.4 | |
| Green | William Morton | 160 | 20.7 | |
| Majority | | | | |
| Turnout | | | 28.1 | |
| Independent hold | | Swing | | |

=== Skipton West ===
Skipton West
| Party | Candidate | Votes | % | ±% |
|---|---|---|---|---|
| Labour | Peter Madeley | 504 | 51.0 | |
| Conservative | Christopher Clark | 289 | 29.3 | |
| UKIP | James Millar | 195 | 19.7 | |
| Majority | | | | |
| Turnout | | | 33.1 | |
| Labour hold | | Swing | | |

=== Sutton-in-Craven ===
Sutton-in-Craven
| Party | Candidate | Votes | % | ±% |
|---|---|---|---|---|
| Independent | Stephen Morrell | 670 | 83.3 | |
| Labour | John Pope | 134 | 16.7 | |
| Majority | | | | |
| Turnout | | | 28.3 | |
| Independent hold | | Swing | | |

=== Upper Wharfedale (by-election) ===
Upper Wharfedale
| Party | Candidate | Votes | % | ±% |
|---|---|---|---|---|
| Conservative | Sue Metcalfe | 480 | 63.3 | |
| Green | Anna Craven | 177 | 23.4 | |
| Liberal Democrats | Sian Wheal | 59 | 7.8 | |
| Labour | Virpi Kettu | 42 | 5.5 | |
| Majority | | | | |
| Turnout | | | 50.0 | |
| Conservative hold | | Swing | | |

Tanya Ilsa Graham was the previous Conservative councillor for Upper Wharfedale, having won the seat in 2016. The seat was made vacant following Graham's resignation.

=== West Craven ===
West Craven
| Party | Candidate | Votes | % | ±% |
|---|---|---|---|---|
| Independent | Richard Pringle | 370 | 59.9 | |
| Independent | Alex Bentley | 153 | 24.8 | |
| Labour | Geraldine Reardon | 95 | 15.4 | |
| Majority | | | | |
| Turnout | | | 39.7 | |
| Independent gain from Conservative | | Swing | | |

== Changes 2019–2023 ==
- On 1 April 2023, Craven District Council was abolished and replaced by North Yorkshire Council.

=== By-elections ===
==== Barden Fell by-election ====
Barden Fell by-election 6 May 2021
| Party | Candidate | Votes | % | ±% |
|---|---|---|---|---|
| Independent | David Pighills | 500 | 77.9 | +25.8 |
| Conservative | John Dawson | 142 | 22.1 | −14.3 |
| Majority | | 358 | 55.8 | |
| Turnout | | 642 | | |
| Independent hold | | Swing | | |

A by-election was held in Barden Fell on 6 May 2021 after the disqualification of independent councillor David Pighills due to non-attendance. Pighills ran in the by-election and won.

==== Penyghent by-election ====
Penyghent by-election 6 May 2021
| Party | Candidate | Votes | % | ±% |
|---|---|---|---|---|
| Conservative | Robert Ogden | 392 | 49.6 | −18.9 |
| Liberal Democrats | Luke Allan | 295 | 37.3 | +37.3 |
| Labour | Brian McDaid | 103 | 13.0 | −13.3 |
| Majority | | 97 | 12.3 | |
| Turnout | | 790 | | |
| Conservative hold | | Swing | | |

A by-election was held in Penyghent on 6 May 2021 after the death of Conservative councillor Richard Welch. The seat was won by Conservative candidate Robert Ogden.
