= 1998 Craven District Council election =

1998 UK local government election

The 1998 Craven District Council election took place on 7 May 1998 to elect members of Craven District Council in North Yorkshire, England. One third of the council was up for election and the Liberal Democrats lost overall control of the council to no overall control.

After the election, the composition of the council was:

- Conservative 13
- Liberal Democrats 13
- Independent 4
- Labour 4

== Background ==
13 seats were contested in 1998 over 11 wards, with a total of 26 candidates standing at the election. Two of the seats contested in Ingleborough and Settle were by-elections after councillors John Clapham and Robert Walker resigned from the council.

Three councillors also stood down at the election; two Liberal Democrats, Ralph Atkinson and Peter Putwain, and one independent Malcolm Riley. Three candidates were elected unopposed, David Ireton and Carl Lis in Ingleborough, and Stephen Butcher in Calton.

== Election result ==
The Conservatives gained seats from the Liberal Democrats to leave both parties with 13 seats on the council.

Craven local election result 1998
Party	Seats	Gains	Losses	Net gain/loss	Seats %	Votes %	Votes	+/−
Conservative	8			+5	61.5			
Liberal Democrats	3			-5	23.1			
Independent	2			+1	15.4			
Labour	0			-1	0			
