= 2015 Craven District Council election =

2015 UK local government election

Map of the results

The 2015 Craven District Council election took place on 7 May 2015 to elect members of the Craven District Council in England. It was held on the same day as other local elections.

== By-elections between 2015 and 2016 ==
A by-election was held in Embsay-with-Eastby on 31 March 2016 after the death of Conservative councillor Andy Quinn. The seat was won by independent candidate Brian Shuttleworth.

Embsay-with-Eastby by-election 31 March 2016
Party	Candidate	Votes	%	±%
Independent	Brian Shuttleworth	466	79.9	+79.9
Conservative	Trevor Kent	117	20.1	−38.9
Majority		349	59.9	
Turnout		583		
Independent gain from Conservative		Swing		
