= 2006 Craven District Council election =

2006 UK local government election

Map of the results of the 2006 Craven District Council election. Independents in light grey, Conservatives in blue and Liberal Democrats in yellow. Wards in dark grey were not contested in 2006.

The 2006 Craven District Council election took place on 4 May 2006 to elect members of Craven District Council in North Yorkshire, England. One third of the council was up for election and the council stayed under no overall control.

After the election, the composition of the council was as follows:

- Conservative 13
- Independent 11
- Liberal Democrats 6

== Candidates ==
Candidates at the election included possibly the oldest candidate in the country, Bob Leakey, at the age of 91, who stood for his own Virtue Currency Cognitive Appraisal Party in Settle and Ribblebanks, after having stood at the 2005 general election in Skipton and Ripon constituency. Another candidate at the election was the leader of the Craven Ratepayers Action Group, Alan Perrow, who was nominated for the Conservatives, against independent councillor Philip Barrett. However Perrow quit the party days after being approached to be a Conservative candidate, to instead stand independently at the election, although he was still on the ballot paper as a Conservative.

== Election result ==
There was no change in the composition of the council, after all of the sitting councillors held the seats they were defending. This left the Conservatives with 13 seats, independents had 11 seats and there were 6 Liberal Democrats.

Craven local election result 2006
Party	Seats	Gains	Losses	Net gain/loss	Seats %	Votes %	Votes	+/−
Independent	4	0	0	0	44.4	30.3	2,646	+5.4%
Conservative	3	0	0	0	33.3	45.4	3,960	+3.8%
Liberal Democrats	2	0	0	0	22.2	23.3	2,035	-6.6%
Virtue Currency Cognitive Appraisal Party	0	0	0	0	0	1.0	83	+1.0%

== Ward results ==
Aire Valley with Lothersdale
Party	Candidate	Votes	%	±%
Liberal Democrats	Mark Wheeler	644	53.0	+26.5
Conservative	Irene Greaves	572	47.0	−5.7
Majority		72	5.9	
Turnout		1,216	44.7	−7.0
Liberal Democrats hold		Swing		

Bentham
Party	Candidate	Votes	%	±%
Independent	Manuel Camacho	685	57.6	+9.1
Conservative	William Burton	505	42.4	−9.1
Majority		180	15.1	
Turnout		1,190	41.3	
Independent hold		Swing		

Gargrave and Malhamdale
Party	Candidate	Votes	%	±%
Conservative	Stephen Butcher	758	66.6	+8.1
Liberal Democrats	Alison Jerger	380	33.4	−8.1
Majority		378	33.2	+16.1
Turnout		1,138	47.6	
Conservative hold		Swing		

Glusburn
Party	Candidate	Votes	%	±%
Independent	Philip Barrett	946	73.8	
Conservative	Alan Perrow	336	26.2	
Majority		610	47.6	
Turnout		1,282	41.2	
Independent hold		Swing		

Hellifield and Long Preston
Party	Candidate	Votes	%	±%
Conservative	Helen Firth	461	61.2	
Independent	Victoria Lunn	292	38.8	
Majority		169	22.4	
Turnout		753	44.4	
Conservative hold		Swing		

Ingleton and Clapham
Party	Candidate	Votes	%	±%
Independent	Carl Lis	unopposed		
Independent hold		Swing		

Penyghent
Party	Candidate	Votes	%	±%
Conservative	Richard Welch	434	59.5	+4.8
Liberal Democrats	Alison Fawcett	295	40.5	+40.5
Majority		139	19.1	+9.8
Turnout		729	49.8	−1.4
Conservative hold		Swing		

Settle and Ribblebanks
Party	Candidate	Votes	%	±%
Liberal Democrats	David Heather	716	54.2	+4.7
Conservative	Robert Firth	522	39.5	−11.0
Virtue Currency Cognitive Appraisal Party	Robert Leakey	83	6.3	+6.3
Majority		194	14.7	
Turnout		1,321	46.3	−7.0
Liberal Democrats hold		Swing		

Sutton-in-Craven
Party	Candidate	Votes	%	±%
Independent	Stephen Place	723	66.0	
Conservative	David Harrison	372	34.0	
Majority		351	32.1	
Turnout		1,095	39.9	
Independent hold		Swing		
