= St Michael's Church, Kirkby Malham =

Anglican church in North Yorkshire, England

Coordinates: 54.0449°N 2.1633°W

- Church of St Michael the Archangel
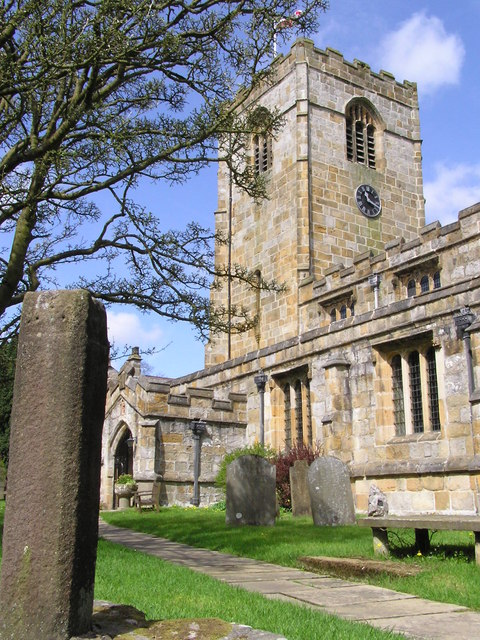
- St Michael's Church tower

- Location in North Yorkshire
- OS grid reference: SD 894,610
- Location: Kirkby Malham, North Yorkshire
- Country: England
- Denomination: Anglican
- Website: St Michael the Archangel, Kirkby Malham

History
- Status: Parish church
- Dedication: Saint Michael the Archangel

Architecture
- Functional status: Active
- Heritage designation: Grade I
- Designated: 20 February 1958
- Architect: Paley and Austin (restoration)
- Architectural type: Church
- Style: Gothic

Specifications
- Materials: Millstone grit

Administration
- Province: York
- Diocese: Leeds
- Archdeaconry: Craven
- Deanery: Bowland and Ewecross
- Parish: Kirkby-in-Malhamdale

Clergy
- Vicar: Sue McWhinney

St Michael's Church is in the village of Kirkby Malham, North Yorkshire, England. It is an active Anglican parish church in the deanery of Bowland and Ewecross, the archdeaconry of Craven, and the Diocese of Leeds. It is recorded in the National Heritage List for England as a designated Grade I listed building.

== History ==
It is thought that the church originated no later than the 9th century, and possibly as early as the 7th century, although there is no mention of the church in the Domesday Book of 1086. By 1199 the advowson of the church was owned by West Dereham Abbey in Norfolk. The whole church was completely rebuilt in the 15th century. It was restored in 1879–81 by the Lancaster architects Paley and Austin.

== Architecture ==
=== Exterior ===
The church is constructed in millstone grit, with roofs of lead, slate, and stone slate. Its plan consists of a four bay nave with a clerestory, north and south aisles, both with side chapels, a south porch, a north hearse house, a two-bay chancel, and a west tower. The tower is in two stages, with diagonal buttresses. Towards the top of the southeast tower are the carved coat of arms of Fountains Abbey. There are more coats of arms on the southwest buttress. The tower contains a three-light west window, a trefoil-headed niche on the south side, clock faces on the east and west sides, and three-light bell openings on each side. At the summit of the tower is an embattled parapet. The porch contains two consecration crosses. Along the side of the south aisle, and in its west wall, are three-light windows. The south chapel is known as the Lady Chapel. This has a doorway on the west side and a three-light window on the east side. The north aisle contains two-light windows at the west end and along the sides, a blocked entrance and a hearse house. The north chapel is dedicated to Saint John the Baptist. It has a three-light east window. The windows on the south of the clerestory have three-light windows, and the windows on the north side have two-lights. The parapet of both clerestories is embattled. In the east wall of the chancel is a five-light window.

=== Interior ===
Inside the church three of the piers of the arcades contain trefoil-headed niches. In the north aisle are some box pews dating from the 17th and early 18th centuries. The baptistry contains a font dating from the 11th century. This is decorated with zigzag moulding, and is set on a 19th-century base. In the south aisle are two piscinae. The single-manual organ built at an uncertain date by Isaac Abbott of Leeds was removed in 1980. There is a ring of eight bells. The oldest of these were cast in 1602 and 1617 by William Oldfield of York, one was cast in 1785 by Robert Dalton, and fourth was by John Warner & Sons and is dated 1897. The other four bells were cast by Eijsbouts in 2002.

== See also ==
- Grade I listed buildings in North Yorkshire (district)
- Listed buildings in Kirkby Malham
- List of ecclesiastical works by Paley and Austin
