= 2008 Craven District Council election =

2008 UK local government election

Map of the results of the 2008 Craven District Council election. Conservatives in blue, Liberal Democrats in yellow and independents in light grey. Wards in dark grey were not contested in 2008.

The 2008 Craven District Council election took place on 1 May 2008 to elect members of Craven District Council in North Yorkshire, England. One third of the council was up for election and the council stayed under no overall control.

After the election, the composition of the council was

- Conservative 15
- Independent 10
- Liberal Democrats 5

== Background ==
Before the election an alliance between 9 of the 10 independents and the 6 Liberal Democrats controlled the council, with independent Carl Liss as council leader. The 14 Conservative councillors were in opposition, supported by the remaining independent councillor, Ken Hart.

== Election result ==
The Conservatives won 8 of the 11 seats contested, including gaining one seat, to have exactly half of seats on the council. The Conservative gain came in Skipton East where Pam Heseltine took the seat from the Liberal Democrats. This reduced the Liberal Democrats to 5 councillors after they held the other 2 seats they were defending. The only independent councillor to be defending a seat, David Ireton, retained it in Ingleton and Clapham, while the 5 Labour candidates came last in each of the wards they contested.

Following the election Conservative Chris Knowles-Fitton became leader of the council, taking over from independent Carl Lis.

Craven local election result 2008
Party	Seats	Gains	Losses	Net gain/loss	Seats %	Votes %	Votes	+/−
Conservative	8	1	0	+1	72.7	55.0	6,268	+9.9%
Liberal Democrats	2	0	1	-1	18.2	27.4	3,124	+12.8%
Independent	1	0	0	0	9.1	10.2	1,159	-28.2%
Labour	0	0	0	0	0	7.4	843	+7.4%

== Ward results ==
Aire Valley with Lothersdale
Party	Candidate	Votes	%	±%
Conservative	Pat Fairbank	824	63.0	+16.0
Liberal Democrats	Stephen Walpole	307	23.5	−29.5
Labour	Bob Holland	177	13.5	+13.5
Majority		517	39.5	
Turnout		1,308	45.7	+1.0
Conservative hold		Swing		

Barden Fell
Party	Candidate	Votes	%	±%
Conservative	Chris Knowles-Fitton	550	83.3	+32.1
Liberal Democrats	Andrew Rankine	110	16.7	+5.2
Majority		440	66.7	+52.8
Turnout		660	49.6	−10.3
Conservative hold		Swing		

Cowling
Party	Candidate	Votes	%	±%
Conservative	Ady Green	470	69.5	+52.6
Labour	Paul Routledge	206	30.5	+30.5
Majority		264	39.1	+32.1
Turnout		676	38.9	−11.2
Conservative hold		Swing		

Grassington
Party	Candidate	Votes	%	±%
Conservative	Richard Foster	539	77.1	+3.9
Liberal Democrats	John Manley	160	22.9	−3.9
Majority		379	54.2	+7.7
Turnout		699	52.4	−13.0
Conservative hold		Swing		

Ingleton and Clapham
Party	Candidate	Votes	%	±%
Independent	David Ireton	1,159	78.6	
Conservative	Terence Thorpe	315	21.4	
Majority		844	57.2	
Turnout		1,474	46.7	
Independent hold		Swing		

Settle and Ribblebanks
Party	Candidate	Votes	%	±%
Conservative	Donny Whaites	860	64.3	+24.8
Liberal Democrats	Alison Fawcett	300	22.4	−31.8
Labour	Edward Saunders	178	13.3	+13.3
Majority		560	41.9	
Turnout		1,338	45.3	−1.0
Conservative hold		Swing		

Skipton East
Party	Candidate	Votes	%	±%
Conservative	Pamela Heseltine	595	50.5	−3.4
Liberal Democrats	Eric Jaquin	464	39.4	+39.4
Labour	Chris Rose	119	10.1	+10.1
Majority		131	11.1	+3.2
Turnout		1,178	42.3	+1.8
Conservative gain from Liberal Democrats		Swing		

Skipton North
Party	Candidate	Votes	%	±%
Conservative	Paul Whitaker	737	57.4	+15.4
Liberal Democrats	Carole Manley	547	42.6	+15.0
Majority		190	14.8	+3.2
Turnout		1,284	46.5	−3.5
Conservative hold		Swing		

Skipton South
Party	Candidate	Votes	%	±%
Liberal Democrats	Andrew Solloway	391	50.4	+50.4
Conservative	Charlotte Gott	222	28.6	+15.0
Labour	Duncan Hall	163	21.0	+21.0
Majority		169	21.8	
Turnout		776	27.7	−8.4
Liberal Democrats hold		Swing		

Skipton West
Party	Candidate	Votes	%	±%
Liberal Democrats	Paul English	592	56.9	−5.0
Conservative	John Garton	449	43.1	+5.0
Majority		143	13.7	−10.1
Turnout		1,041	35.7	+0.3
Liberal Democrats hold		Swing		

Upper Wharfedale
Party	Candidate	Votes	%	±%
Conservative	John Roberts	707	73.6	+10.1
Liberal Democrats	John Bennett	253	26.4	+26.4
Majority		454	47.3	+20.3
Turnout		960	62.5	+1.4
Conservative hold		Swing		
