= 2011 Craven District Council election =

2011 UK local government election

Map of the results of the 2011 Craven District Council election. Independents in light grey, Conservatives in blue and Liberal Democrats in yellow. Wards in dark grey were not contested in 2011.

The 2011 Craven District Council election took place on 5 May 2011 to elect members of Craven District Council in North Yorkshire, England. One third of the council was up for election and the Conservative party stayed in overall control of the council.

After the election, the composition of the council was as follows:

- Conservative 18
- Independent 8
- Liberal Democrats 4

== Election result ==
There was no change in the political composition of the council after the election, with the Conservatives retaining a majority. All nine councillors who were defending seats held them, with the closest result being in Skipton West where Liberal Democrat Polly English held the seat with a majority of 7 votes over Conservative candidate David Walsh. The only new councillor after the election came in Gargrave and Malhamdale, where Conservative Simon Myers held the seat previously held by party colleague David Crawford, who stood down at the election.

The results meant the Conservatives retained 18 seats and there were 8 independent and 4 Liberal Democrat councillors following the election, while Labour did not win any seats despite standing in 8 of the 10 seats contested.

Craven local election result 2011
Party	Seats	Gains	Losses	Net gain/loss	Seats %	Votes %	Votes	+/−
Independent	5	0	0	0	50.0	35.1	4,127	+14.9%
Conservative	4	0	0	0	40.0	35.6	4,186	-8.4%
Liberal Democrats	1	0	0	0	10.0	10.3	1,207	-17.9%
Labour	0	0	0	0	0	17.2	2,025	+11.9%
Green	0	0	0	0	0	1.8	213	+1.8%

== Ward results ==
Bentham
Party	Candidate	Votes	%	±%
Independent	Linda Barrington	838	60.3	+32.0
Conservative	Gerald Hurtley	552	39.7	−2.6
Majority		286	20.6	
Turnout		1,390	47.1	−23.3
Independent hold		Swing		

Embsay with Eastby
Party	Candidate	Votes	%	±%
Conservative	John Quinn	496	61.5	−1.9
Labour	James Black	217	26.9	+26.9
Liberal Democrats	John Manley	93	11.5	−25.1
Majority		279	34.6	+7.8
Turnout		806	53.7	+8.0
Conservative hold		Swing		

Gargrave and Malhamdale
Party	Candidate	Votes	%	±%
Conservative	Simon Myers	907	65.6	+3.4
Labour	Christopher Baker	346	25.0	+25.0
Liberal Democrats	Andrew Rankine	130	9.4	−28.4
Majority		561	40.6	+16.1
Turnout		1,383	55.6	−20.1
Conservative hold		Swing		

Glusburn
Party	Candidate	Votes	%	±%
Independent	Graham Beck	816	60.0	−7.7
Conservative	James Stafford	303	22.3	+0.6
Labour	Robert Holland	241	17.7	+7.2
Majority		513	37.7	−8.3
Turnout		1,360	43.3	−27.0
Independent hold		Swing		

Skipton East
Party	Candidate	Votes	%	±%
Conservative	Christopher Harbron	589	44.8	−5.7
Liberal Democrats	Eric Jaquin	405	30.8	−8.6
Labour	Christine Rose	322	24.5	+14.4
Majority		184	14.0	+2.9
Turnout		1,316	47.7	+5.4
Conservative hold		Swing		

Skipton North
Party	Candidate	Votes	%	±%
Conservative	Marcia Turner	518	34.8	−22.6
Independent	John Kerwin-Davey	376	25.2	+25.2
Green	Claire Nash	213	14.3	+14.3
Liberal Democrats	Roland Wohlrapp	203	13.6	−29.0
Labour	Brigid Reeves	180	12.1	+12.1
Majority		142	9.5	−5.3
Turnout		1,490	53.1	+6.6
Conservative hold		Swing		

Skipton South
Party	Candidate	Votes	%	±%
Independent	Robert Heseltine	520	56.8	+56.8
Labour	Duncan Hall	197	21.5	+0.5
Conservative	Martin Bellamy	133	14.5	−14.1
Liberal Democrats	Lindsay Bottomley	65	7.1	−43.3
Majority		323	35.3	
Turnout		915	32.9	+5.2
Independent hold		Swing		

Skipton West
Party	Candidate	Votes	%	±%
Liberal Democrats	Pauline English	311	27.1	−29.8
Conservative	David Walsh	304	26.5	−16.6
Labour	Peter Madeley	250	21.8	+21.8
Independent	Bernard Clarke	203	17.7	+17.7
Independent	James Paton	80	7.0	+7.0
Majority		7	0.6	−35.1
Turnout		1,148	39.1	+3.4
Liberal Democrats hold		Swing		

Sutton-in-Craven
Party	Candidate	Votes	%	±%
Independent	Kenneth Hart	871	76.2	+8.9
Labour	Keith Reeves	272	23.8	+11.5
Majority		599	52.4	+5.5
Turnout		1,143	40.4	−27.7
Independent hold		Swing		

West Craven
Party	Candidate	Votes	%	±%
Independent	Robert Mason	423	52.4	−0.9
Conservative	Piers Tempest	384	47.6	+0.9
Majority		39	4.8	−1.8
Turnout		807	51.5	+0.9
Independent hold		Swing		
