= 2003 Craven District Council election =

2003 UK local government election

Map of the results of the 2003 Craven District Council election. Independents in light grey, Conservatives in blue and Liberal Democrats in yellow. Wards in dark grey were not contested in 2003.

The 2003 Craven District Council election took place on 1 May 2003 to elect members of Craven District Council in North Yorkshire, England. One third of the council was up for election and the council stayed under no overall control.

After the election, the composition of the council was:

- Conservative 11
- Independent 10
- Liberal Democrats 9

== Background ==
Before the election the Conservatives were the largest group with 13 seats, while there 9 Liberal Democrats and 8 independents. However the council was controlled by an alliance between independents and Liberal Democrats.

10 of the 30 seats on the council were elected in 2003, with the Conservatives defending 6, independents 3 and the Liberal Democrats defended 1 seat. Two of the three independents were re-elected without opposition.

== Election result ==
Independents gained 2 seats from the Conservatives to mean there were 10 independent councillors on the council. The independent gains from the Conservatives came in Skipton East where Mike Hill was elected, and in West Craven where Robert Mason gained a seat. Meanwhile, another independent, Robert Heseltine, regained a seat on the council 3 years after having been forced to resign his seat due to being convicted of falsifying accounts, after defeating the sitting independent councillor Frances Cook by 217 votes in Skipton South.

Despite losing 2 seats the Conservatives remained the largest group on the council with 11 councillors, after holding another 4 seats. Meanwhile, the Liberal Democrats stayed on 9 seats, after holding the only seat they had been defending in Skipton West.

Craven local election result 2003
Party	Seats	Gains	Losses	Net gain/loss	Seats %	Votes %	Votes	+/−
Independent	5	2	0	+2	50.0	30.0	2,020	-0.9%
Conservative	4	0	2	-2	40.0	45.7	3,079	+5.6%
Liberal Democrats	1	0	0	0	10.0	24.3	1,633	-3.8%

== Ward results ==
Bentham
Party	Candidate	Votes	%	±%
Conservative	Gerald Hurtley	521	51.5	
Independent	Manuel Camacho	490	48.5	
Majority		31	3.1	
Turnout		1,011		
Conservative hold		Swing		

Embsay with Eastby
Party	Candidate	Votes	%	±%
Conservative	John Quinn	404	67.0	
Independent	Dennis Hall	199	33.0	
Majority		205	34.0	
Turnout		603		
Conservative hold		Swing		

Gargrave and Malhamdale
Party	Candidate	Votes	%	±%
Conservative	David Crawford	596	58.5	
Liberal Democrats	Andrew Wood	422	41.5	
Majority		174	17.1	
Turnout		1,018		
Conservative hold		Swing		

Glusburn
Party	Candidate	Votes	%	±%
Independent	Roger Nicholson	unopposed		
Independent hold		Swing		

Skipton East
Party	Candidate	Votes	%	±%
Independent	Michael Hill	423	41.7	
Conservative	Pamela Heseltine	320	31.5	
Liberal Democrats	Darren Moorby	272	26.8	
Majority		103	10.1	
Turnout		1,015		
Independent gain from Conservative		Swing		

Skipton North
Party	Candidate	Votes	%	±%
Conservative	Marcia Turner	604	56.4	
Liberal Democrats	Andrew Rankine	466	43.6	
Majority		138	12.9	
Turnout		1,070		
Conservative hold		Swing		

Skipton South
Party	Candidate	Votes	%	±%
Independent	Robert Heseltine	412	57.5	
Independent	Frances Cook	195	27.2	
Conservative	Kenneth Creek	110	15.3	
Majority		217	30.3	
Turnout		717		
Independent gain from Independent		Swing		

Skipton West
Party	Candidate	Votes	%	±%
Liberal Democrats	Pauline English	473	67.0	
Conservative	Paul Whitaker	233	33.0	
Majority		240	34.0	
Turnout		706		
Liberal Democrats hold		Swing		

Sutton-in-Craven
Party	Candidate	Votes	%	±%
Independent	Kenneth Hart	unopposed		
Independent hold		Swing		

West Craven
Party	Candidate	Votes	%	±%
Independent	Robert Mason	301	50.8	+16.2
Conservative	John Binns	291	49.2	+5.6
Majority		10	1.7	
Turnout		592		
Independent gain from Conservative		Swing		

== By-elections between 2003 and 2004 ==
A by-election was held in Bentham on 13 November 2003 after the resignation of Liberal Democrat councillor John Pilkington on his being charged by police with child pornography. The seat was gained by an independent Manuel Camacho with a majority of 107 votes over Conservative John Jackson.

Bentham by-election 13 November 2003
Party	Candidate	Votes	%	±%
Independent	Manuel Camacho	474	56.4	+7.9
Conservative	John Jackson	367	43.6	−7.9
Majority		107	12.8	N/A
Turnout		841	29.6	
Independent gain from Liberal Democrats		Swing		
