= Calton, North Yorkshire =

Village and civil parish in North Yorkshire, England

Coordinates: 54.0286°N 2.14137°W

Calton
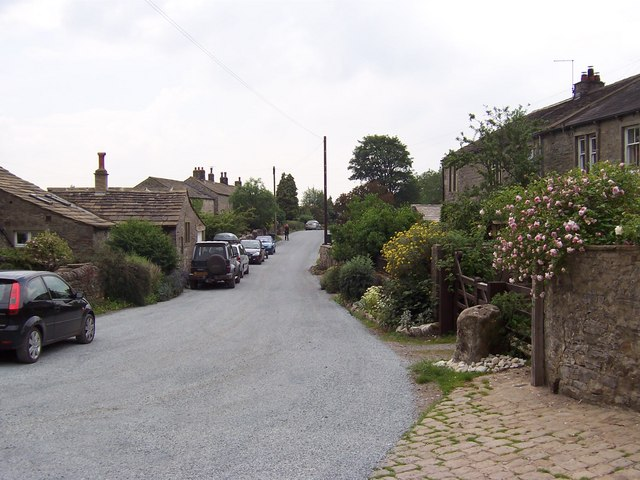
- Houses in Calton

- Location within North Yorkshire
- OS grid reference: SD908591
- Civil parish: Calton
- Unitary authority: North Yorkshire
- Ceremonial county: North Yorkshire
- Region: Yorkshire and the Humber
- Country: England
- Sovereign state: United Kingdom
- Post town: SKIPTON
- Postcode district: BD23
- Police: North Yorkshire
- Fire: North Yorkshire
- Ambulance: Yorkshire

Calton is a village and civil parish in the county of North Yorkshire, England, on the River Aire in Airedale. In both the 2001 and 2011 Censuses the population was less than 100, so details were included in the civil parish of Flasby with Winterburn. In 2015, North Yorkshire County Council estimated the population of the village to be 60.

The village is mentioned in the Domesday Book as belonging to Roger the Poitevin. The name derives from the Old English Calf-tūn; literally, the town where calves were reared. Ancient deeds and poll-tax returns indicate that the village had a public house and a chapel in 1379. In 1851 there were 75 residents listed in the census, of whom no fewer than 33, in five households, were called Shackleton.

Until 1974 it was part of the West Riding of Yorkshire. From 1974 to 2023 it was part of the Craven District, it is now administered by the unitary North Yorkshire Council.

Calton is on the Pennine Cycleway (NCN Route 68), and the Pennine Way passes the between the west of the village and the River Aire. This route is also part of the Airedale Way, between Leeds and Malham Tarn.

== Notable people ==
- John Lambert, Parliamentarian general in the English Civil War. Calton Hall, an old house with Medieval origins, was his family home. The house is now grade II listed. After the restoration of the monarchy, Lambert was tried and exiled to Guernsey, and the family home and land around Calton were given to Lord Fauconberg. He then returned them to the family.

== See also ==
- Listed buildings in Calton, North Yorkshire
