= 2000 Craven District Council election =

2000 UK local government election

The 2000 Craven District Council election took place on 4 May 2000 to elect members of Craven District Council in North Yorkshire, England. One third of the council was up for election and the Conservative Party stayed in overall control of the council.

After the election, the composition of the council was:

- Conservative 18
- Independent 12
- Liberal Democrats 4

== Background ==
Before the election the Conservatives had a majority with 18 seats, compared to 11 independents and 5 Liberal Democrats. Councillors who stood down at the 2000 election, included independent Joan Ibbotson of Aire Valley ward, who had represented the ward for 12 years, having been a Liberal Democrat until she left the party in 1999. Conservative councillor for Upper Wharfedale for the past four years, Ken Luty also did not contest the 2000 election.

The Labour Party did not put up any candidates for the election in 2000, while Ingleborough councillor David Ireton contested the election as an independent after having previously been a Conservative councillor.

== Election result ==
The Conservatives remained with 18 seats after the elections, while the number of independents increased by one to 12 and the Liberal Democrats dropped one to 4. Turnout at the election ranged from a high of 54.3% in Bolton Abbey ward to a low of 20.3% in Skipton East ward.

Conservative Christopher Knowles-Fitton gained Bolton Abbey from independent Robert Heseltine, while the Conservatives also picked up the Aire Valley seat previously held by independent Joan Ibbotson before she stood down at the election. However independent John Alderson gained Cowling from Conservative Janet Ackroyd by one vote and David Ireton held Ingelborough as an independent after leaving the Conservatives with a majority of 653 votes over the Conservative candidate. Meanwhile, independent Frances Burrows gained Skipton East from the Liberal Democrats, but the Liberal Democrats did hold seats in Bentham and Settle wards.

Craven local election result 2000
Party	Seats	Gains	Losses	Net gain/loss	Seats %	Votes %	Votes	+/−
Independent	5			+1	45.5			
Conservative	4			0	36.4			
Liberal Democrats	2			-1	18.2			

== By-elections between 2000 and 2002 ==
A by-election was held in Skipton South on 7 June 2001 after the death of councillor Beryl Beresford.

Skipton South by-election 7 June 2001
Party	Candidate	Votes	%	±%
Liberal Democrats		574	55.7	+31.7
Conservative		293	28.5	−14.0
Independent		163	15.8	+15.8
Majority		281	27.2	
Turnout		1,030		
Liberal Democrats gain from Conservative		Swing		
