= 2012 Craven District Council election =

2012 UK local government election

Map of the results of the 2012 Craven District Council election. Conservatives in blue, independents in light grey and Liberal Democrats in yellow. Wards in dark grey were not contested in 2012.

The 2012 Craven District Council election took place on 3 May 2012 to elect members of Craven District Council in North Yorkshire, England. One third of the council was up for election and the Conservative party stayed in overall control of the council.

After the election, the composition of the council was as follows:

- Conservative 16
- Independent 10
- Liberal Democrats 4

== Background ==
Before the election the Conservatives controlled the council with 30 seats, compared to 9 independents and 3 Liberal Democrats. The Conservative leader of the council, Chris Knowles-Fitton, was among the councillors to defend their seats, standing in Barden Fell ward, while in Ingleton and Clapham, the sitting independent councillor David Ireton stood at the election as a Conservative. Meanwhile, the Conservative councillor for Hellifield and Long Preston for the past 13 years, Helen Firth, resigned from the council in March 2012 to leave that seat vacant before the election.

== Election result ==
The number of Conservative councillors was reduced by 2 to 16, but they retained a majority of 2 seats over the 10 independents and 4 Liberal Democrats.

Independents gained 2 seats from the Conservatives after John Kerwin-Davy took Skipton North from the Conservatives, while Chris Moorby won by 34 votes the seat in Hellifeild and Long Preston vacated by Conservative Helen Firth. However the Conservatives picked up a seat in Ingleton and Clapham as David Ireton won the seat as a Conservative, after previously being an independent councillor for the same seat. Meanwhile, the Liberal Democrats also gained up a seat from the Conservatives in Skipton East, where Eric Jaquin took the seat from Pam Heseltine.

Craven local election result 2012
Party	Seats	Gains	Losses	Net gain/loss	Seats %	Votes %	Votes	+/−
Conservative	7	1	3	-2	58.3	50.1	5,135	+14.5%
Independent	3	2	1	+1	25.0	14.2	1,457	-20.9%
Liberal Democrats	2	1	0	+1	16.7	17.1	1,748	+6.8%
Labour	0	0	0	0	0	16.4	1,681	-0.8%
Green	0	0	0	0	0	2.3	231	+0.5%

== Ward results ==
Aire Valley with Lothersdale
Party	Candidate	Votes	%	±%
Conservative	Patricia Fairbank	610	63.0	+20.7
Labour	Paul Routledge	359	37.0	+26.6
Majority		251	25.9	
Turnout		969	33.4	−41.1
Conservative hold		Swing		

Barden Fell
Party	Candidate	Votes	%	±%
Conservative	Christopher Knowles-Fitton	377	72.4	−10.9
Liberal Democrats	Clive Bowers	144	27.6	+10.9
Majority		233	44.7	−22.0
Turnout		521	39.8	−9.8
Conservative hold		Swing		

Cowling
Party	Candidate	Votes	%	±%
Conservative	Adrian Green	311	60.4	−9.1
Labour	Andrew Rankine	204	39.6	+9.1
Majority		107	20.8	−18.3
Turnout		515	28.9	−10.0
Conservative hold		Swing		

Grassington
Party	Candidate	Votes	%	±%
Conservative	Richard Foster	390	73.7	−3.4
Liberal Democrats	Edward Walker	139	26.3	+3.4
Majority		251	47.4	−6.8
Turnout		529	39.9	−12.5
Conservative hold		Swing		

Hellifield and Long Preston
Party	Candidate	Votes	%	±%
Independent	Robert Moorby	489	51.8	+51.8
Conservative	Richard Thwaite	455	48.2	−11.0
Majority		34	3.6	
Turnout		944	53.5	−17.4
Independent gain from Conservative		Swing		

Ingleton and Clapham
Party	Candidate	Votes	%	±%
Conservative	David Ireton	807	74.7	+16.1
Liberal Democrats	Mark Christie	273	25.3	−7.4
Majority		534	49.4	+23.5
Turnout		1,080	35.2	−37.1
Conservative gain from Independent		Swing		

Settle and Ribblebanks
Party	Candidate	Votes	%	±%
Conservative	Donald Whaites	696	66.5	+24.2
Labour	Christopher Baker	350	33.5	+33.5
Majority		346	33.1	+28.4
Turnout		1,046	35.6	−36.1
Conservative hold		Swing		

Skipton East
Party	Candidate	Votes	%	±%
Liberal Democrats	Eric Jaquin	480	46.7	+15.9
Conservative	Pamela Heseltine	289	28.1	−16.7
Labour	Christine Rose	259	25.2	+0.7
Majority		191	18.6	
Turnout		1,028	37.3	−10.4
Liberal Democrats gain from Conservative		Swing		

Skipton North
Party	Candidate	Votes	%	±%
Independent	John Kerwin-Davey	358	30.3	+5.1
Conservative	Paul Whitaker	296	25.0	−9.8
Green	Claire Nash	231	19.5	+5.2
Liberal Democrats	Roland Wohlrapp	185	15.7	+2.1
Labour	James Black	112	9.5	−2.6
Majority		62	5.2	
Turnout		1,182	42.0	−11.1
Independent gain from Conservative		Swing		

Skipton South
Party	Candidate	Votes	%	±%
Independent	Andrew Solloway	382	54.7	−2.1
Labour	Duncan Hall	179	25.6	+4.1
Conservative	Nathan Harrison	83	11.9	−2.6
Liberal Democrats	Maureen Greene	54	7.7	+0.6
Majority		203	29.1	−6.2
Turnout		698	24.7	−8.2
Independent hold		Swing		

Skipton West
Party	Candidate	Votes	%	±%
Liberal Democrats	Paul English	379	36.5	+9.4
Independent	Bernard Clarke	228	22.0	+4.3
Labour	Peter Madeley	218	21.0	−0.8
Conservative	Kelly Hayes-Head	213	20.5	−6.0
Majority		151	14.5	+13.9
Turnout		1,038	34.6	−4.5
Liberal Democrats hold		Swing		

Upper Wharfedale
Party	Candidate	Votes	%	±%
Conservative	John Roberts	608	86.6	+13.0
Liberal Democrats	Hazel Bulcock	94	13.4	−13.0
Majority		514	73.2	+25.9
Turnout		702	45.9	−16.6
Conservative hold		Swing		
