= Gregory Chapel =

Mountain in the United Kingdom

Gregory Chapel (Archie Styrigg)
- Cairn & sheep shelter, Gregory Chapel

Highest point
- Elevation: 695 m (2,280 ft)
- Prominence: ca 30 m
- Parent peak: Great Shunner Fell
- Listing: Nuttall
- Coordinates: 54.3969°N 2.304°W

Geography
- Location: Mallerstang, Cumbria, England
- Parent range: Pennines
- OS grid: NY802003
- Topo map: OS Landranger 91

Gregory Chapel is one of the high points of the fells on the border between Cumbria and North Yorkshire.

The summit is marked by a nearby sheep shelter and an unusual and conspicuous cairn - taller and more rectangular than most others locally. (This may, perhaps, be the origin of the curious name "chapel"?)
The main rock in the area is limestone, with Millstone Grit outcrops on the tops. There are fine views over to Wild Boar Fell and Swarth Fell 5 km to the west, across the dale of Mallerstang.

Hill walkers seem to prefer to give it the name Archy Styrigg; although Ordnance Survey maps show this name along the small plateau at about 680 m elevation to the southwest of the summit, leading over Mallerstang Edge. (This would fit the Norse name, characteristic of this area: sty = track or path, rigg = ridge: i.e. path along a ridge).

It is classified as a Nuttall and sub-Hewitt, but it has a relatively small prominence, having several other high points nearby, and hardly merits being described as a peak. This high, boggy ground is really one great plateau which rarely drops much below 600 m (2000 ft) between Mallerstang Edge and Great Shunner Fell, 5.4 km to the south-east.

Gregory Chapel is one of the three high points of Mallerstang Edge, the others being High Seat 1.04 km almost due north, and Hugh Seat 1.26 km SSE. They mark the eastern border of the Parish of Mallerstang, Cumbria - which is also the county border between Cumbria and North Yorkshire.

== Walking the Parish Bounds ==
This extract from the 1811 report on the walking of the parish bounds, lists the landmarks to be visited in this area as:

  ..12 As heaven water deals, to the south end of High seat
    13 Thence over little Sleddle head to Gregory Chappell
    14 Thence along Gregory band to a hurrock of stones 
    15 Thence to the height of Hugh Seat Morvill
    16 Thence as heaven water deals, to the Skarth of Skaiths...

The charming term "as heaven water deals" means following the course of a beck downstream.
The parish bounds were last walked in July 2006
