= Aisgill =

Hamlet in Cumbria, England

Coordinates: 54.36443°N 2.34162°W

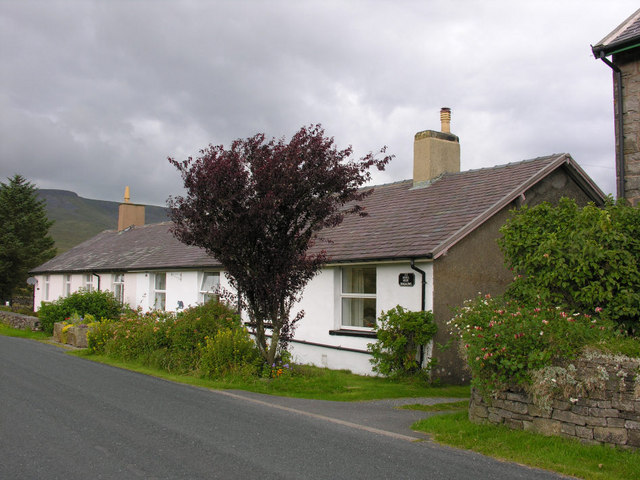
- Aisgill Moor Cottages

- Location in Eden, Cumbria Location within Cumbria
- OS grid reference: SD779966
- Civil parish: Mallerstang
- Unitary authority: Westmorland and Furness
- Ceremonial county: Cumbria
- Region: North West
- Country: England
- Sovereign state: United Kingdom
- Post town: KIRKBY STEPHEN
- Postcode district: CA17
- Dialling code: 017683
- Police: Cumbria
- Fire: Cumbria
- Ambulance: North West
- UK Parliament: Westmorland and Lonsdale

Aisgill is the southernmost of the hamlets that form the parish of Mallerstang in the English county of Cumbria. It is on the B6259 road, at the head of Mallerstang dale, just before the boundary between Cumbria and North Yorkshire.

== History ==
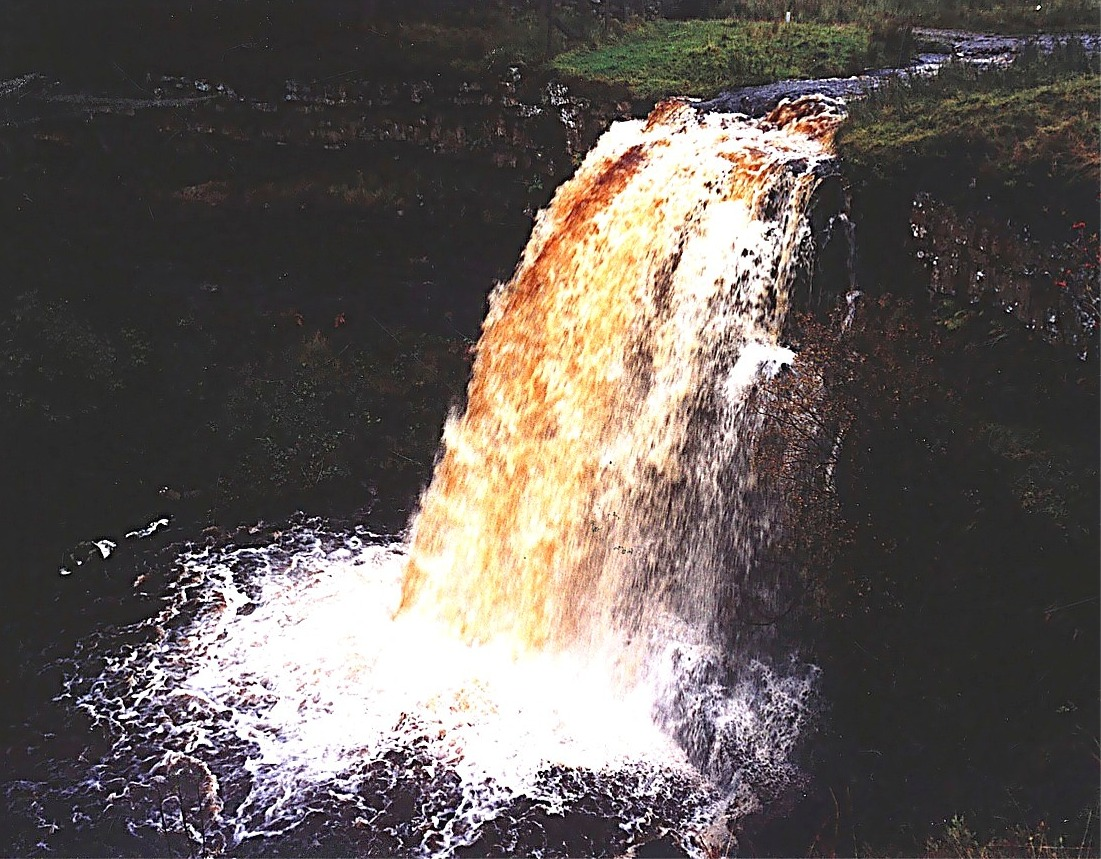
Hellgill Force, the biggest waterfall on the River Eden, Cumbria.

The highest waterfall on the River Eden, Hellgill Force, with a drop of about 9.75 metres (according to recent measurements) is just to the north, at grid reference SD779966. The river itself rises (at first as Red Gill beck, later becoming Hell Gill beck) below Hugh Seat in the peat bogs above here. It finally becomes the river Eden after merging with the Ais Gill beck, which flows down from Wild Boar Fell.

Aisgill is at both a county and a natural geographical boundary. It is at the watershed (sometimes called "the watershed of England") from which the Eden flows north towards the Irish Sea via the Solway Firth, while the River Ure flows south towards Wensleydale, and eventually into the North Sea.

Swarth Fell frames the western side of the head of Mallerstang dale, and from Aisgill there is a view along the steep, narrow valley, with Mallerstang Edge and High Seat framing the eastern side. But the view at Aisgill is dominated by the great table-top bulk of Wild Boar Fell, to the south-west.

The Settle-Carlisle Railway reaches its highest point at "Aisgill Summit" 1,169 ft (356 m); and there is a small viaduct where the line crosses Ais Gill beck. There have been three notable rail accidents nearby: the Hawes Junction rail crash in 1910, one in 1913 and most recently in 1995.

== Gallery ==
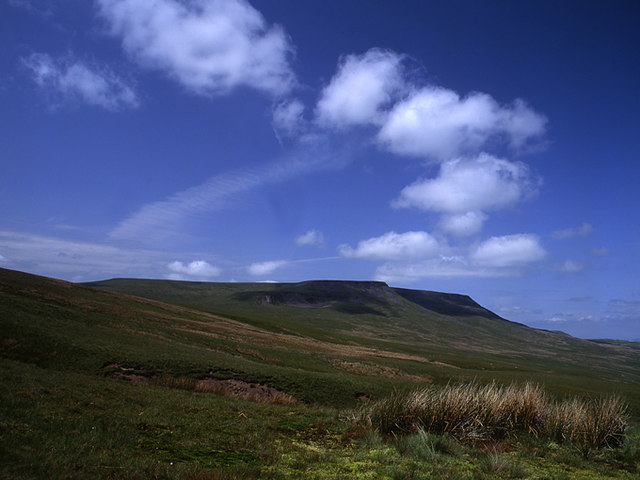
Aisgill Moor from above Aisgill Moor Cottages

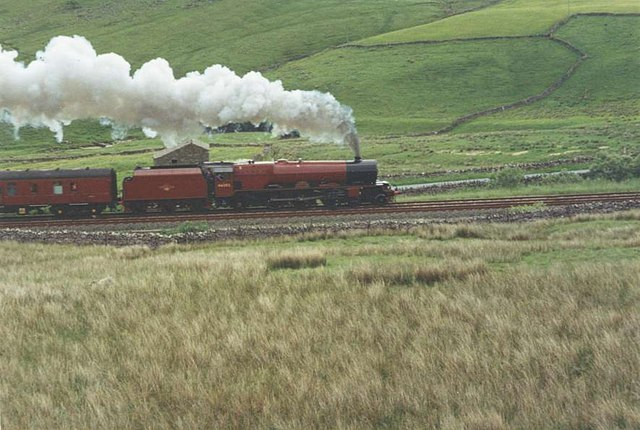
No. 46203 Princess Margaret Rose approaches the summit at Aisgill

== See also ==
- 1913 Ais Gill rail accident
- Hawes Junction rail crash

== External links and references ==
- A Virtual Walk through Mallerstang
- Commemoration of those who died on this section of the Settle-Carlisle railway
