= Pendragon Castle =

Ruined castle in Mallerstang, Cumbria, England

- Cumbria, England
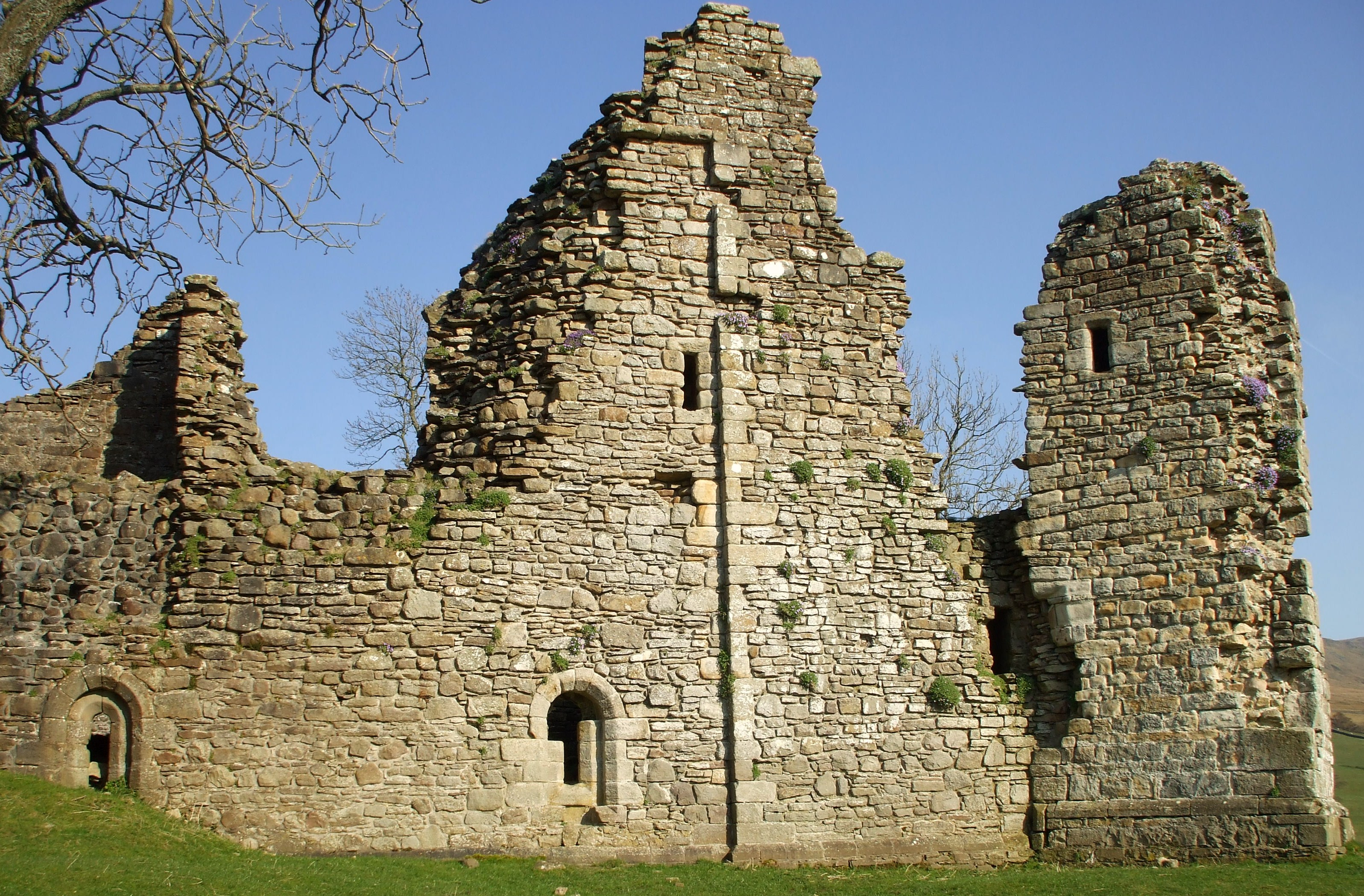
- A general view of Pendragon Castle, Cumbria, England

Site information
- Owner: private
- Condition: ruins

Location
- Coordinates: 54.41747°N 2.33898°W

Site history
- Built: 12th century
- Built by: Uther Pendragon according to legend, Ranulph de Meschines according to history

Pendragon Castle is a ruin located in Mallerstang Dale, Cumbria, south of Kirkby Stephen, and close to the hamlet of Outhgill (at grid reference NY781025). It stands above a bend in the River Eden, overlooked by Wild Boar Fell to the south-west and Mallerstang Edge to the east. It is a Grade I listed building.

== Legend ==
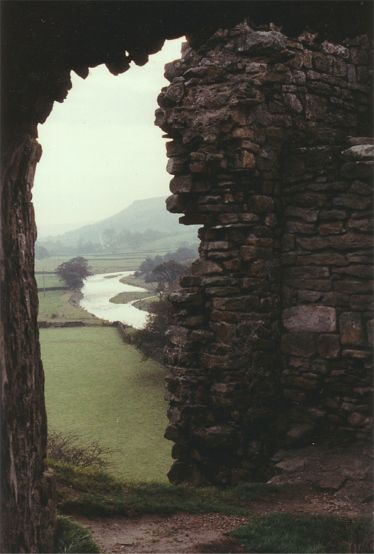
Pendragon Castle, looking down on the River Eden

According to legend, the castle was built by Uther Pendragon, father of King Arthur, who is said to have unsuccessfully tried to divert the river to provide its moat, as is recalled in a well-known local couplet:

Let Uther Pendragon do what he can,
Eden will run where Eden ran.

Uther (if he was indeed a real person) was possibly a 5th-century chieftain who led resistance to the invading Anglo-Saxons. According to another local legend, Uther and many of his men died here when the Saxons poisoned the well (but other legends give St Albans as the location for his death). There are several other "Arthurian" sites in Cumbria – for example King Arthur's Round Table, near Penrith – and many names in the North-west, such as Penrith and Cumbria, have Celtic origins.

== History ==
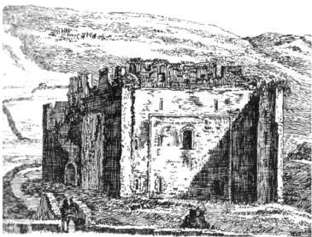
Pendragon Castle, ca 1740

Despite legend (and the discovery of a Roman coin) there is no evidence of any pre-Norman use of this site. The castle was built in the 12th century by Ranulph de Meschines, during the reign of King William Rufus. It has the remains of a Norman keep, with the later addition of a 14th-century garderobe turret, and some further additions in the 17th century.

One of its most notable owners was Sir Hugh de Morville, Lord of Westmorland, one of the four knights who murdered St Thomas Becket in 1170. A nearby high point on Mallerstang Edge is named after him, as Hugh Seat. Another owner was Lady Idonea de Veteripont who, after the death of her husband (Roger de Lilburn), spent much of her remaining years living in the castle, until her death in 1334. Lady Idonea founded the church of St Mary in the nearby hamlet of Outhgill, ca 1311.

The castle was attacked by Scots raiding parties in 1342 and again in 1541. After the latter attack it remained an uninhabitable ruin until it passed into the hands of Lady Anne Clifford, who rebuilt it in 1660, also adding a brewhouse, bakehouse, stables and coach-house. It remained one of the favourites among her many castles until her death in 1676 at the age of 86.

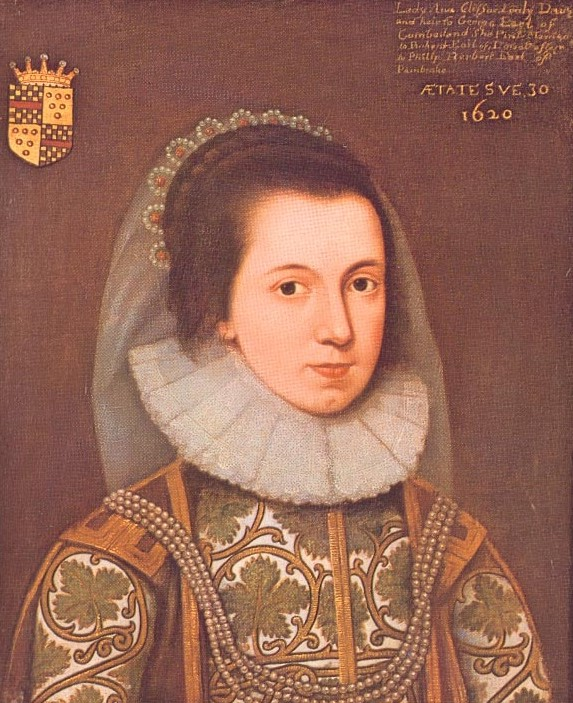
Lady Anne Clifford, who was buried in St Lawrence's Church, Appleby

Lady Anne's successor, the Earl of Thanet, had no use for the castle and removed anything of value from it, including the lead from the roof. By the 1770s much of the building above the second storey had collapsed, and it has since gradually decayed further to become the romantic ruin seen today.

In 1962, the castle was sold at auction by Appleby Castle Estate to Raven Frankland, a landowner and archaeologist, for £525. During the Second World War, Frankland's father, Edward, had written a book about the Arthurian legends associated with the castle. The current owner, John Bucknall, inherited the castle following the deaths of his cousin Raven in 1998 and Raven's wife Juliet in 2013.

In recent years some of the rubble has been cleared, some consolidation of the crumbling walls has been undertaken, and a limited archaeological survey has been carried out by the Lancaster University Archaeological Unit published in 1996.

The castle is privately owned and on farmland. There is public access to the outside of the building, with a warning that the castle walls should not be entered. It appears that some remedial work has been carried out with the aid of a grant.

== Etymology ==
The name Pendragon was first recorded in 1309 and is likely to have been a product of later medieval enthusiasm for Arthurian romance. It is less likely that the name is derived from Brittonic pen, meaning "head, top, summit", and dragon, "dragon", honoratively "prince, warlord" (Welsh pen draig).

== See also ==
- Grade I listed buildings in Cumbria
- Listed buildings in Mallerstang
