= Vale of Eden =

Valley in Northwest England

Eden Valley
- Looking over the Eden Valley from Dufton

- Location within the United Kingdom
- Ceremonial county: Cumbria
- Country: England
- Sovereign state: United Kingdom

The Vale of Eden, also known as the Eden Valley, is formed by the course of the River Eden, one of the major rivers of Northwest England. It is however of much greater extent than the actual valley of the river, lying between the Lake District and the northern part of the Pennines. It lies almost entirely within the county of Cumbria.

== Extent ==
The Eden Valley, or Vale of Eden, is not a formally delimited geographic area. In the National Character Area Profile (NCAP) for Natural England's Eden Valley character area, the locality is described in terms of river catchments, listing:

- Croglin Water
- Crowdundle Beck
- River Caldew
- River Eamont
- River Eden
- River Gelt
- River Irthing
- River Lowther
- River Lyvennet
- River Petteril

These catchments also extend to the west across Inglewood Forest from the Eden itself.

A very similar geographic extent is given by the area of relatively low land in the valley, bounded by the Rural Payments Agency Moorland Line. The Orton Fells NCAP can be included in the Vale of Eden on this basis, alongside the Eden Valley NCAP, and it is within the River Eden catchment. The neighbouring Cumbria High Fells and North Pennines NCAPs would be excluded – the Eden Valley would lie between them but would not include them.

The former Eden District Council used the name for a wider area, stretching from Tebay in the south west to Nenthead in the north east, though for tourist information purposes, the Eden Valley label may include places outside the area that can be conveniently be visited from it. For example, Visit Lake District suggests that "Pooley Bridge straddles the River Eamont at the head of Ullswater in the picturesque Eden Valley." It is within the list of river catchments given in the Eden Valley NCAP but is actually located within the Cumbria High Fells NCAP, not the Eden Valley one.

== River Eden ==
The river has its source in the peat bogs below Hugh Seat, in the dale of Mallerstang (54.388°N 2.294°W). At first it heads off south (as Hellgill Beck) before turning back north for the rest of its course – except just before its outlet into the sea which it enters from the east.

The Eden passes through the market towns of Kirkby Stephen and Appleby-in-Westmorland, once the county town of Westmorland. It then bypasses, but remains close to, Penrith where it receives the waters of Ullswater via the River Eamont, its major tributary. Via some ancient villages and fine bridges it reaches and passes through Carlisle, the major city in this whole area. It then enters the sea where, together with the River Esk, coming down from the North, it forms the Solway Firth which divides Scotland from England on the Atlantic side of the country.

For catchment management purposes, the Eden forms part of the Eden and Esk Management Catchment. Within that, the Eden Upper catchment extends from the source to its confluence with the River Eamont east of Penrith. The Eden Lower catchment extends from there to the Solway.

== Landscape ==
The whole area is gentle and pastoral, undulating with bleak, barren and impressive hills on either side. It is National Character Area number 9.

== See also ==
- Leath
- Eden District
- Rheged
