= Outhgill =

Hamlet in Cumbria, England

Coordinates: 54.410°N 2.336°W

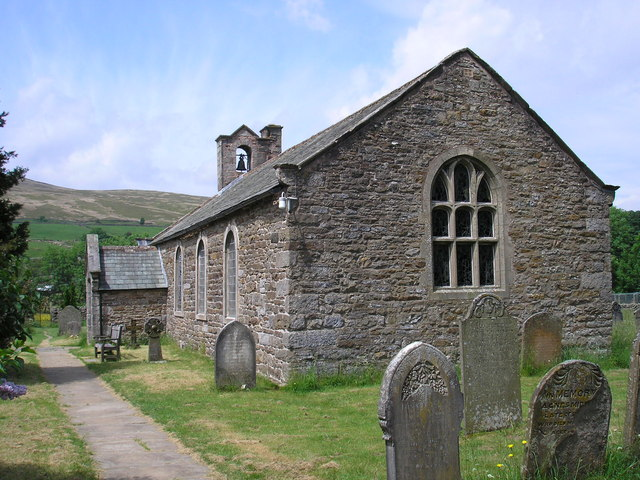
- St Mary's Church, Outhgill

- Location in Eden, Cumbria Location within Cumbria
- OS grid reference: NY781016
- Civil parish: Mallerstang
- Unitary authority: Westmorland and Furness
- Ceremonial county: Cumbria
- Region: North West
- Country: England
- Sovereign state: United Kingdom
- Post town: KIRKBY STEPHEN
- Postcode district: CA17
- Dialling code: 017683
- Police: Cumbria
- Fire: Cumbria
- Ambulance: North West
- UK Parliament: Westmorland and Lonsdale

Outhgill is a hamlet in Mallerstang, Cumbria, England. It lies about 5 miles (8 km) south of Kirkby Stephen.

It is the main hamlet in the dale of Mallerstang (a civil parish) which retains the Norse pattern of its original settlement: a series of small hamlets and isolated houses, with no village centre. In the 19th century, as the main hamlet at the centre of the dale, Outhgill had an inn, a post office, a smithy, the parish church and a Methodist chapel. Of these, only the church survives.

St Mary's Church was founded by Lady Ideonea de Veteripont in the 14th century (possibly 1311) but was restored, in fact more or less rebuilt, in 1663 by Lady Anne Clifford, as the plaque above the door relates. The simple, dignified interior contains an 18th-century font, a faded coat of arms of Lady Anne from the year she restored the church, a set of shelves that used to hold the loaves of bread distributed weekly under Middleton's Charity, and kneelers embroidered by ladies of the dale. The stained glass windows all date from Victorian times or later.

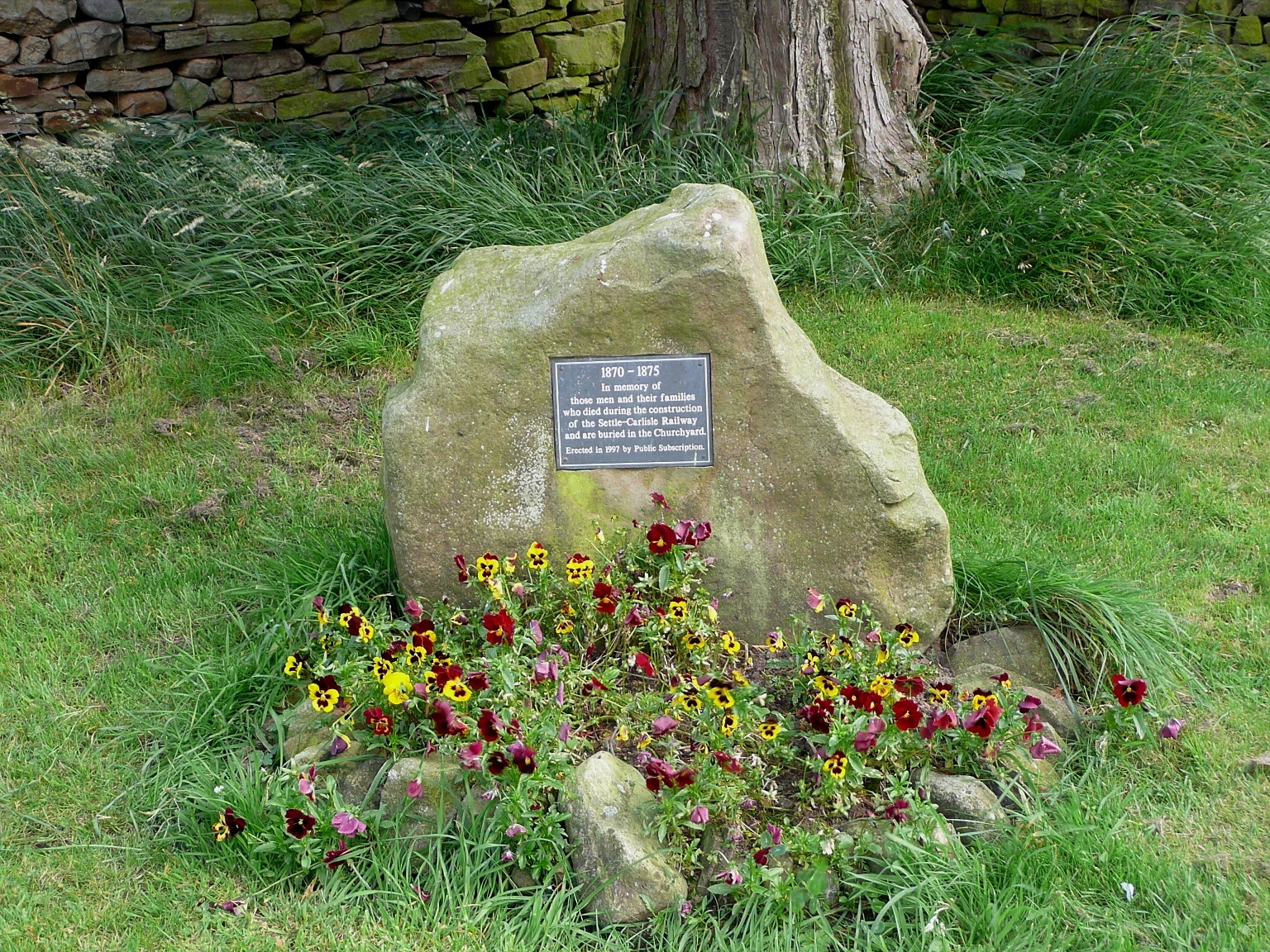
Navvies' memorial stone in St Mary's Churchyard

In the churchyard there are the unmarked graves of 25 of the builders of the Mallerstang section of the Settle-Carlisle Railway, and members of their families, who died during the construction of the line. A monument to them, marking the area where they are buried, was dedicated in 1997.

Almost opposite the church is the former Wesleyan Chapel, built in 1878. There are about a dozen houses, including one where the father of the great scientist Michael Faraday was the blacksmith in the late 18th century (moving to London in the year Michael was born).

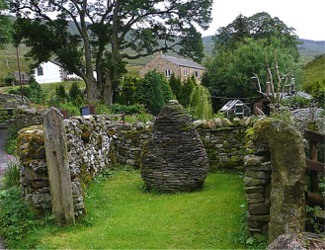
The Pinfold, Outhgill, containing a sculpture by Andy Goldsworthy

The old pinfold contains a sculpture by Andy Goldsworthy.

There is a replica of the "Jew Stone" on the village green. The original monument was set up by the rather eccentric William Mounsey in 1850 on Black Fell Moss below Hugh Seat, to mark the source of the River Eden. It got its name from the inscriptions in Greek and Hebrew.

Pendragon Castle, reputedly founded by King Arthur's father, Uther Pendragon, is a mile or so to the north at grid reference NY779025.

A smaller hamlet, Shoregill, is half a mile to the southwest at NY779014.

== See also ==
- Listed buildings in Mallerstang
