= Nine Standards Rigg =

Peak in the Pennine Hills of England

Coordinates: 54.4541°N 2.2716°W

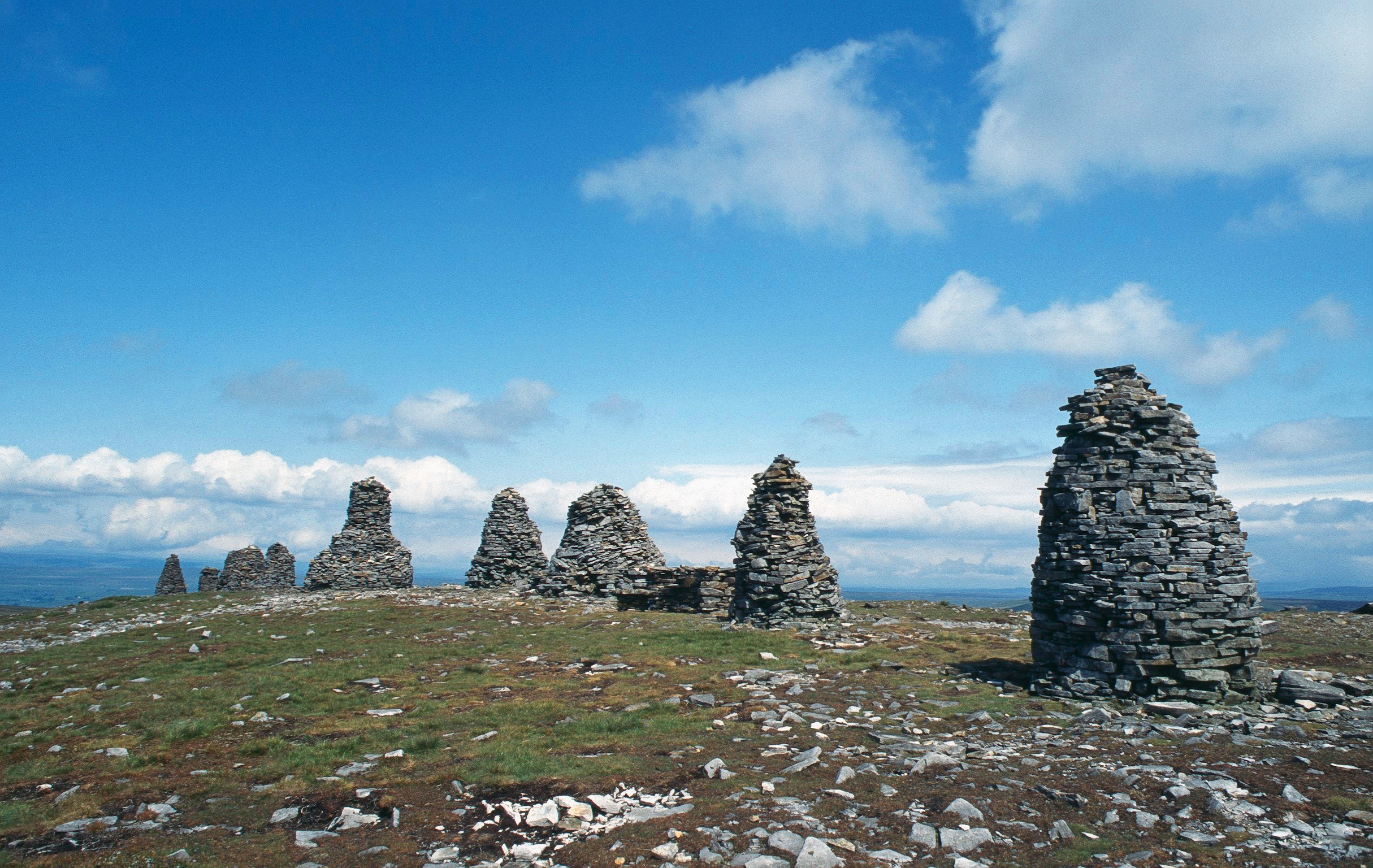
- The Nine Standards on the summit

Highest point
- Elevation: 662 m (2,172 ft)
- Prominence: 157 m (515 ft)
- Parent peak: Great Shunner Fell
- Listing: Marilyn, Hewitt, Nuttall

Naming
- English translation: hill of the nine cairns
- Language of name: English

Geography
- Location: Pennines, England
- OS grid: NY825061
- Topo map: OS Landrangers 91, 92

Nine Standards Rigg is the summit of Hartley Fell in the Pennine Hills of England. It lies near the boundary between Cumbria and North Yorkshire, a few miles south-east of Kirkby Stephen and approximately 770 yards (700 m) outside the Yorkshire Dales National Park. Nine Standards Rigg lies within the North Pennines Area of Outstanding Natural Beauty (AONB). The name is derived from a group of cairns, the Nine Standards, located near the summit. The fell is listed as Nine Standards Rigg, rather than Hartley Fell, in Alan Dawson's book The Hewitts and Marilyns of England.

The Nine Standards themselves, some of which were originally more than four metres high, are on the line of the Coast to Coast Walk between Kirkby Stephen and Keld, and are just to the north of the fell's summit. Situated at a height of 650 m, their original purpose is uncertain but one possibility is that they marked the boundary between Westmorland and Swaledale. They stand at the watershed between the Eden - headwaters to Scandal Beck catchment to the north west and the Whitsundale Beck from Source to River Swale catchment to the south east.

The Nine Standards offer a better viewpoint than the Ordnance Survey trig point that marks the actual summit of the fell. Cross Fell and Great Dun Fell can be seen to the north-west and Wild Boar Fell and the Howgills feature in the south-west. The High Street Range of the eastern Lake District can be seen further to the west. Great Shunner Fell, crossed by the Pennine Way, and Rogan's Seat lie to the south-east.
