= Listed buildings in Mallerstang =

Mallerstang is a civil parish in Westmorland and Furness, Cumbria, England. It contains eight listed buildings that are recorded in the National Heritage List for England. Of these, one is listed at Grade I, the highest of the three grades, and the others are at Grade II, the lowest grade. The parish is mainly rural; it contains the village of Outhgill and the surrounding countryside and moorland. The listed buildings comprise a ruined tower house, a church, a group of three farmhouses with farm buildings, a house and its forecourt wall, and a bridge.

== Key ==
Grade	Criteria
I	Buildings of exceptional interest, sometimes considered to be internationally important
II	Buildings of national importance and special interest

== Buildings ==
Name and location	Photograph	Date	Notes	Grade
Pendragon Castle; 54.41869°N 2.33770°W		12th century	This originated as a tower house with a free-standing keep; a garderobe tower was added later, and it was damaged by fire in 1541. Lady Anne Clifford restored it in 1660 but following her death it was dismantled by her family in the late 17th century, and is now a ruin. The remains measure about 65 feet (20 m) by 59 feet (18 m), and include a plinth, and the lower parts of corner towers containing loops. At the entrance is a slot for a portcullis which is flanked by stairs. The ruin and the surrounding earthworks are a Scheduled Monument.	I
St Mary's Church; 54.40793°N 2.33744°W		14th century	The church was extensively rebuilt in 1663 by Lady Anne Clifford, and there were further restorations in 1768, 1879 and 1909. It is in stone on a plinth, and has buttresses and a slate roof with stone copings. The church consists of a single cell with a south porch and a bellcote on the west gable.	II
Castle Bridge; 54.42014°N 2.33877°W		17th century (probable)	The bridge, said to have been built for Lady Anne Clifford, carries Tommy Road over the River Eden. It is in stone and consists of a single segmental arch with a span of about 30 feet (9.1 m). Originally about 4 feet (1.2 m) wide, it has been widened to about 12 feet (3.7 m).	II
Easternmost Farmhouse and granary 54.41889°N 2.33262°W	—	1664	The farmhouse and granary are in stone with stone-flagged roofs. The house has quoins, two storeys and five bays. The original doorway has a dated lintel, and the windows are mullioned, some with inserted casements. The granary to the north has a segment-arched wagon entrance with a loft door above.	II
Central Farmhouse, barn and granary 54.41911°N 2.33262°W	—	1688	The house and outbuildings are in stone with a stone-flagged roof. The house has two storeys, four bays, and a gabled 19th-century extension at the rear. Above the wooden porch is an initialled and dated panel. The ground floor windows are mullioned, one has been replaced by a sash window, all have semicircular heads, and above them is a continuous hood mould. The windows in the upper floor are sashes. To the south of the house is a barn, and to the north is a granary with steps leading up to a loft door on the front, and there is a segmental cart entrance on the side.	II
Westernmost Farmhouse and byre 54.41910°N 2.33320°W	—	1732	This originated as a house, a cottage and a byre, and has been converted into a single dwelling. It is in stone, it has a stone-flagged roof, and is in two storeys. The original house has a symmetrical front of three bays, a central doorway, and sash windows. The former cottage has a single bay, an inserted garage door, and a casement window above, and the former byre to the north has two doors, a porch and a casement window.	II
Monkey Puzzle; 54.40932°N 2.33569°W	—	18th century	A stone house with quoins and stone-flagged roofs. The main part is flanked by projecting wings with hipped roofs. There is a symmetrical front of three bays in the main part, with a central doorway and sash windows. To the left is a single bay linking it to the west wing; this bay includes a wagon arch and a sash window above. The west wing has a central door and two windows in each floor, all with semicircular heads, imposts and projecting keystones. In the east wing is an inserted French window.	II
Wall, Monkey Puzzle; 54.40920°N 2.33580°W	—	18th century	The forecourt wall encloses the garden at the front of the house. It is in stone with chamfered coping, and is ramped to the east. At the west end it contains modern gate piers. On the wall is a decorative cast iron pierced railing about 1 foot (0.30 m) high.	II
