= 1913 Ais Gill rail accident =

Train crash in Cumbria, England

Ais Gill rail accident (1913)
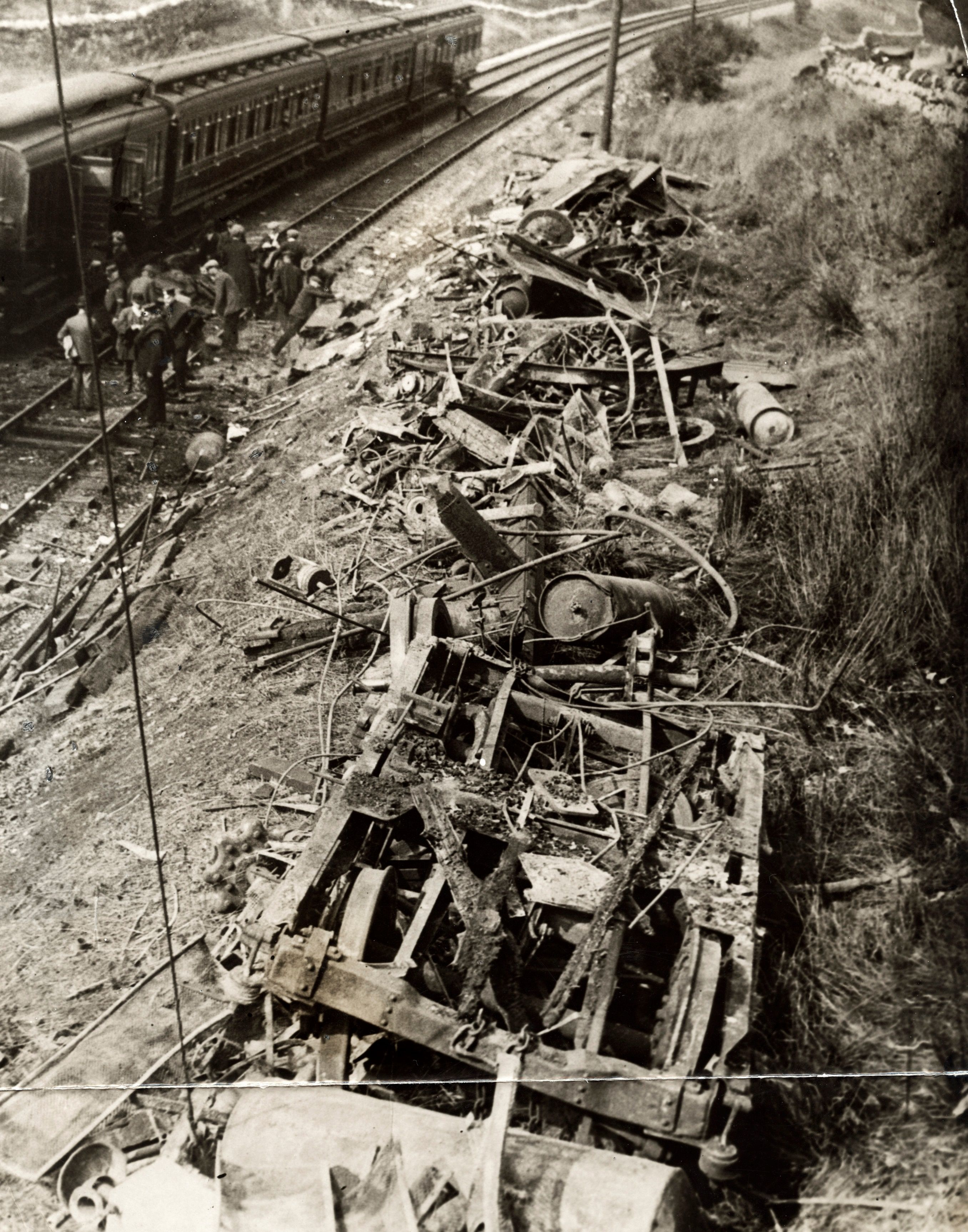

Details
- Date: 2 September 1913; 03:04
- Location: Aisgill, Westmorland
- Coordinates: 54°22′06″N 2°20′58″W
- Country: England
- Line: Settle-Carlisle Line
- Incident type: Collision
- Cause: Driver's error

Statistics
- Trains: 2
- Passengers: 166
- Deaths: 16
- Injured: 38

The Ais Gill rail accident occurred on the Settle–Carlisle line in Northwest England on 2 September 1913. Two long trains were both ascending a steep gradient with some difficulty, because their engines generated barely enough power to carry the load. When the first train stopped to build up steam pressure, the driver and fireman of the second train were distracted by maintenance routines, and failed to observe the warning signals. The collision wrecked several carriages, which were then engulfed by flammable gas, killing 16 people and injuring 38.

== Incident ==
The two trains involved were both passenger trains, which had left Carlisle railway station in the early hours of 2 September, destined for St Pancras station. The Midland Railway, which owned and operated the Settle-Carlisle line, had a policy of using small engines, and the two locomotives had barely sufficient power to surmount the steep gradients on the line with the heavy trains they were assigned. In theory, the load pulled by the first engine, No. 993 4-4-0, was 13 long tons (13.2 t; 14.6 short tons) over its maximum limit of 230 long tons (233.7 t; 257.6 short tons), so the driver asked for assistance from a pilot engine, but was not given one. To make matters worse, the coal with which both engines were supplied had not been properly screened and was full of slack and small coal, which did not fire well and tended to clog the grates.

The first train left Carlisle at 1:38 am. As it struggled up the gradient to Ais Gill summit, the highest point of the Settle-Carlisle line, the steam pressure steadily dropped to the point where the locomotive's ejectors were unable to generate enough vacuum to hold the train brakes "off", and so the train stopped one-half-mile (800 m) short of the summit. As they cleaned out the grate and tried to build up steam pressure, the driver and fireman made the mistake of telling the guard that they would only be standing for a few minutes. The guard therefore did not protect the train in the rear, which could be done by laying detonators on the rails or walking a considerable distance along the line with a lantern.

Meanwhile, the second train, hauled by No. 446 4-4-0, was also struggling, although it had a lighter load. Just short of Mallerstang, a few miles north of Ais Gill, the driver left the cab, to walk round the outside framing and oil some of the working parts while the train was in motion. Even though that procedure was no longer necessary because wick lubricators were in use, drivers apparently continued to do it out of habit and pride.

While the driver was out of the cab, the fireman was having difficulty getting an injector to work, so the water level in the boiler was dropping. When the driver returned, both men worked on the injector, and eventually restarted it. While they were distracted by the problem, their train had passed all the signals at the Mallerstang signal box, which were at danger. The crew also missed a red lantern being waved from the signal box by the Mallerstang signalman, and another being waved by the guard of the first train. Shortly after, they looked up from their distractions to see the first train stalled not far in front of them, and far too late to stop.

== Damage ==
The crash caused an unexpectedly high number of casualties. Even though the last vehicle of the first train was a parcels van, the second train demolished it and ploughed into a third-class coach ahead. The roof of the parcels van slid over the roof of the second engine and sliced into a first class sleeping car behind it. As with many railway collisions in Britain about this time, flammable gas escaping from the cylinders for the gas-oil lighting system ignited and rapidly spread a fire. Fourteen people in the first train died at the scene, and very few remains were later found. Two passengers subsequently died of their injuries. Thirty-eight passengers in the second train were seriously injured.

== Aftermath ==
The subsequent inquiry blamed the crew of the first train for neglecting to protect the rear of their train, and the enginemen (particularly the driver) of the second train for failing to proceed with caution knowing that they must have passed several signals without observing them.

The Mallerstang signalman was also criticised, although his actions did not contribute to the accident. The box controlled three main signals in that direction; the "distant", which could display caution, ("on") or clear ("off"), and two stop signals (home and starter), which could both display danger ("on") or proceed ("off"). The signalman had replaced all his signals to the "on" position after the first train passed and accepted the second train. As the second train approached, he presumed it was proceeding at caution (preparing to stop at the home), and cleared the home signal to allow the train to proceed as far as the starting signal. When he realised that the train was actually steaming hard, he was unable to replace the home to "on" in time.

The inquiry made several recommendations. Most concerned the enforcement of regulations on drivers, firemen, guards and signalmen to ensure closer attention to their primary duty: the care and safety of trains. The more extensive use of Automatic Train Control (ATC), then under extended trial on the Great Western Railway, was discussed. This would sound a siren in the cab to alert the crew of a train if they passed a signal at danger or caution and then automatically apply the brakes if they failed to acknowledge and cancel the warning. Signalboxes should be fitted with detonator placers, to alert engine crews who missed signals or were unable to observe them in fog or thick weather. Electric lighting was clearly safer than gas oil lighting, and steel-framed carriages were less likely to be crushed than wooden-framed stock.

With regard to the issue of lack of motive power, the inquiry found that the Midland's policy was not to use pilot engines on engines that were on or slightly over their weight limit as the time lost in calling up a pilot engine, attaching it to the train and then removing it further along the line was greater than the time lost by a slightly overloaded train unable to keep up to time. The company did not discipline drivers who failed to keep to time because their trains were overloaded.

The driver of the second train, Samuel Caudle, was convicted of culpable negligence and imprisoned. Due to strong public opinion that this was unjust, the Home Secretary ordered his release.

The site of the crash was quite close to the site of the Hawes Junction rail crash which had taken place less than three years earlier, and to which the Midland Railway's small-locomotive policy had also indirectly contributed (in this instance by leading to a large number of light engine movements).

== See also ==
- List of British rail accidents
- Lists of rail accidents
- List of transportation fires

== Sources ==
- Rolt, L.T.C. (1999) [1956]. Red for Danger. Bodley Head / David and Charles / Pan Books /Alan Sutton Publishing. ISBN 978-0-7509-2047-6.
