= Nateby =

Nateby may refer to the following places in England:

- Nateby, Cumbria
- Nateby, Lancashire
