= Devil's Grinding Mill =

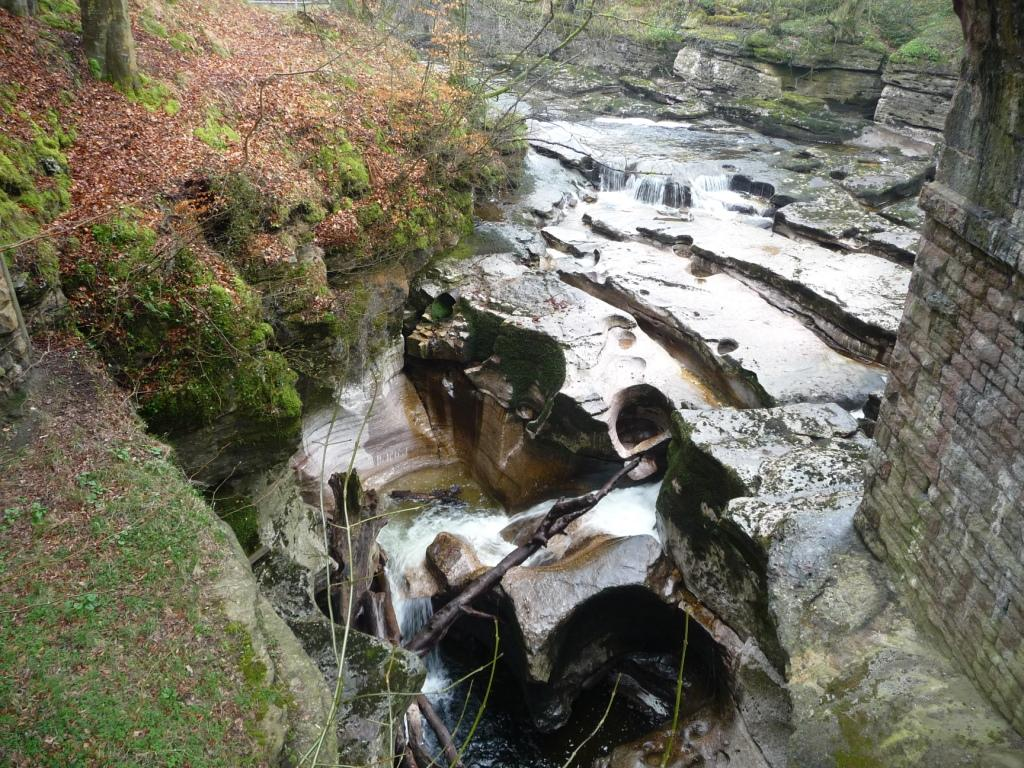

- Location within Cumbria Location within the former Eden District
- OS grid: NY772074
- Coordinates: 54°27′44″N 2°21′06″W

The Devil's Grinding Mill, sometimes known as the Devil's Hole, is part of The Angel's Drainpipe, a partially collapsed cave system on the River Eden in England, which forms dramatic gorges and natural arches. It is south of Kirkby Stephen, within Stenkrith Park. The water moving with the caves and gorges produces an incessant roar. Geologically it is unusual as it has formed not in true limestone, but in brockram, a breccia of limestone fragments within sandstone.

In 1828 it was visited by a travel writer who remembered it as follows (some of the details and spellings have changed or been misremembered by the author):

At about three quarters of a mile east of Kirby Stephen, Westmoreland, is a bridge of solid rock, known by the name of Staincroft Bridge or Stonecroft Bridge, under which runs a small but fathomless rivulet. The water roars and gushes through the surrounding rocks and precipices with such violence, as almost to deafen the visitor. Three or four yards from the bridge is an immense abyss, where the waters “incessantly roar”, which goes by the name of Devil’s Hole; the tradition of which is, that two lovers were swallowed up in this frightful gulf. The neighbouring peasants tell a tale of one Deville, a lover, who, through revenge, plunged his fair mistress into these waters, and afterwards followed her. How far this story may get belief, I know not; but such they aver is the truth, while they mournfully lament the sad affair. They point out a small hole in the bank where you may hear the waters dashing with fury against the projecting rocks. This, some imagine to be the noise of infernal spirits, who have taken up their abode in this tremendous abyss; while others persist in their opinion, that the lover’s name was Deville, and that it retains his name to this day, in commemoration of the horrid deed.

I have seen, and taken a view of the frightful place, which may rather be imagined than described. One part of the water was formerly so narrow, that a wager was laid by a gentleman that he could span it with the thumb and little finger, and which he would have accomplished, but his adversary, getting up in the night time, chipped a piece off the rock with a hammer, and thus won the wager. It is now, however, little more than from a foot and a half, to two feet broad, excepting at the falls and Devil’s Hole. The water runs into the Eden at the distance of about a mile or two from Staincroft Bridge. Trout are caught with the line and net in great quantities, and are particularly fine here.

— W.H.H., The Mirror of Literature, Amusement, and Instruction, Vol. 12, Issue 323
