= Listed buildings in Nateby, Cumbria =

Nateby is a civil parish in Westmorland and Furness, Cumbria, England. It contains two listed buildings that are recorded in the National Heritage List for England. All the listed buildings are designated at Grade II, the lowest of the three grades, which is applied to "buildings of national importance and special interest". The parish contains the village of Nateby, and is otherwise rural. The listed buildings comprise a house and a boundary stone.

== Buildings ==
Name and location	Photograph	Date	Notes
Rakehead Farmhouse and cottage 54.45541°N 2.34283°W	—	1685	This consists of a house and a former granary, now combined into one dwelling, and an adjoining cottage. It is in stone with quoins to the south, and has a stone-flagged roof. There are two storeys and five bays. The house has a door with a chamfered surround and a dated lintel, and mullioned windows. The cottage to the north has altered windows, including inserted sashes.
Boundary stone 54.43683°N 2.34464°W	—	Mid 19th century (probable)	The boundary stone is rectangular with a domical top and is about 3 feet (0.91 m) high. One side is inscribed "MALLERSTAND" and the other side "NATEBY". On the top is a benchmark.
