= Vieuxpont =

Prominent family of Westmorland, England

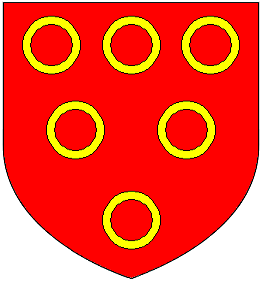
Arms of Vipont: Gules, six annulets or. These arms were later quartered by Baron Clifford

Vipont (alias Vieuxpont) is the name of a prominent family in the history of Westmorland. According to Thomas the name originated in France before 1066 as Vieuxpont ("Old Bridge"), Latinized to de Vetere Ponte ("from the Old Bridge"), with alternative spellings Vezpont, Veepon, Vexpont, Vypont, Vispont, Vypunt, Vespont, Vipond, Vypond, Voypond, Veepond, Vippond, Vipon, Vipan, Vipen, etc. The Vipont family bore arms: Gules, six annulets or 3:2:1, later quartered by Baron Clifford.

== Related family ==
The French family Vieuxpont de Courville shares a similar coat of arm, because they are probably relatives. Courville is a parish located in the traditional county of Perche. The Vieuxpont name may be inherited from the parish of Vieux-Pont (Orne, Viez Pont 1155), situated in the south of Normandy.

== Notable family members ==
- William de Vieuxpont (d.1203), Lord of Westmorland married Maud de Morville (d.1210), daughter of Richard de Morville, Constable of Scotland.
- Robert I de Vipont (d.1227/8), the younger son of William de Vieuxpont and Maud de Morville. He was granted by King John in 1203/4 custody of Appleby and Brough in Westmorland with the hereditary office of Sheriff of Westmorland, to be held from the king under military tenure of 4 knight's fees. This grant is deemed to have created the feudal barony of Appleby. He built Brougham Castle. He married Idonea de Builli, daughter of John de Builli
- John de Vipont of Appleby married Sibyl, sister of William de Ferrers, 5th Earl of Derby (1193–1254).
- Thomas Vipont was a medieval Bishop of Carlisle from 1254 to 1256.
- Isabella Vieuxpont (d. 1291) married Roger de Clifford the younger (d.1282)
- In the 14th century, Lady Idonea de Veteripont, owner of Pendragon Castle and wife of Roger de Lilburne (married in 1264), founded St Mary's Outhgill in Mallerstang.
- Elfrida Vipont was the pen name of Elfrida Vipont Foulds (née Brown) (1902–1992)

=== Robert de Vieuxpont ===
Robert's biography is given in Summerson. He was the younger son of William de Vieuxpont and Maud de Morville (daughter of Hugh de Morville, Lord of Westmorland). He served King Richard I, King John and King Henry III. Appleby Castle, Brough Castle and Whinfell Forest were granted to him by King John in 1203, together with the title of hereditary High Sheriff of Westmorland. He also built Brougham Castle. In the early 13th century, he was also High Sheriff of Nottinghamshire, Derbyshire and the Royal Forests, and had custody of the Sees of York and Durham. Later he moved on to other duties. In 1216, he took responsibility for Cumberland and Carlisle Castle. He died in early 1228, leaving his body and Wycombe estates to the Knights Templar. He married Idonea de Busli, a descendant of Roger de Busli, in 1213. His children were son John (died 1241) and daughter Christian, who married Thomas of Greystoke. When John's son Robert died in 1264, his possessions passed to his daughters and eventually to Robert de Clifford, 1st Baron de Clifford.

== High Sheriffs of Westmorland ==
In 1204 King John granted the "Sheriffwick and rent of the county of Westmorland", together with the custody of the castles of Appleby and Brough, to Robert de Vieuxpont in perpetuity. He was succeeded in 1228 by his son John de Vieuxpont, who died circa 1242, leaving his infant son Robert de Veteripont a ward of the king and of the Prior of Carlisle. Robert later died of wounds received in rebellion against King Henry III circa 1264, during the Battle of Lewes, leaving two daughters Isabella and Idonea. Isabella married Roger de Clifford, father of Robert de Clifford, 1st Baron de Clifford and on the death of Idonea the hereditary shrievalty passed via Isabella to Robert and the de Clifford family.
