= Nateby, Cumbria =

Village and civil parish in England

Coordinates: 54.45542°N 2.3494°W

Nateby
- Village and parish
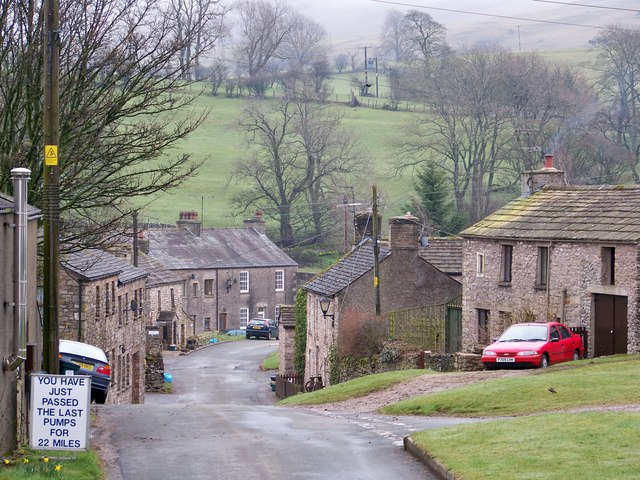
- Nateby

- Location in the former Eden District Location within Cumbria
- Population: 120 (2011)
- OS grid reference: NY774067
- Civil parish: Nateby
- Unitary authority: Westmorland and Furness
- Ceremonial county: Cumbria
- Region: North West
- Country: England
- Sovereign state: United Kingdom
- Post town: KIRKBY STEPHEN
- Postcode district: CA17
- Dialling code: 01768
- Police: Cumbria
- Fire: Cumbria
- Ambulance: North West
- UK Parliament: Westmorland and Lonsdale

Nateby is a village and civil parish in Cumbria, England. The parish had a population of 110 in 2001, increasing to 120 at the 2011 Census.

The village is situated about 1.5 miles (2 km) south of Kirkby Stephen and 15 miles (24 km) north west of Hawes. Historically part of Westmorland, it lies 3 miles (5 km) from the border of North Yorkshire. Since 2016 the village has been on the northern boundary of the Yorkshire Dales National Park. Nearby are the Nine Standards Rigg hills. The village contains a popular country pub, The Black Bull Inn, a garage/petrol station and a small metal-yard.

== See also ==
- Listed buildings in Nateby, Cumbria
