= Kirkby Stephen =

Market town in Cumbria, England

Coordinates: 54.4716°N 2.3479°W

- Town and parish
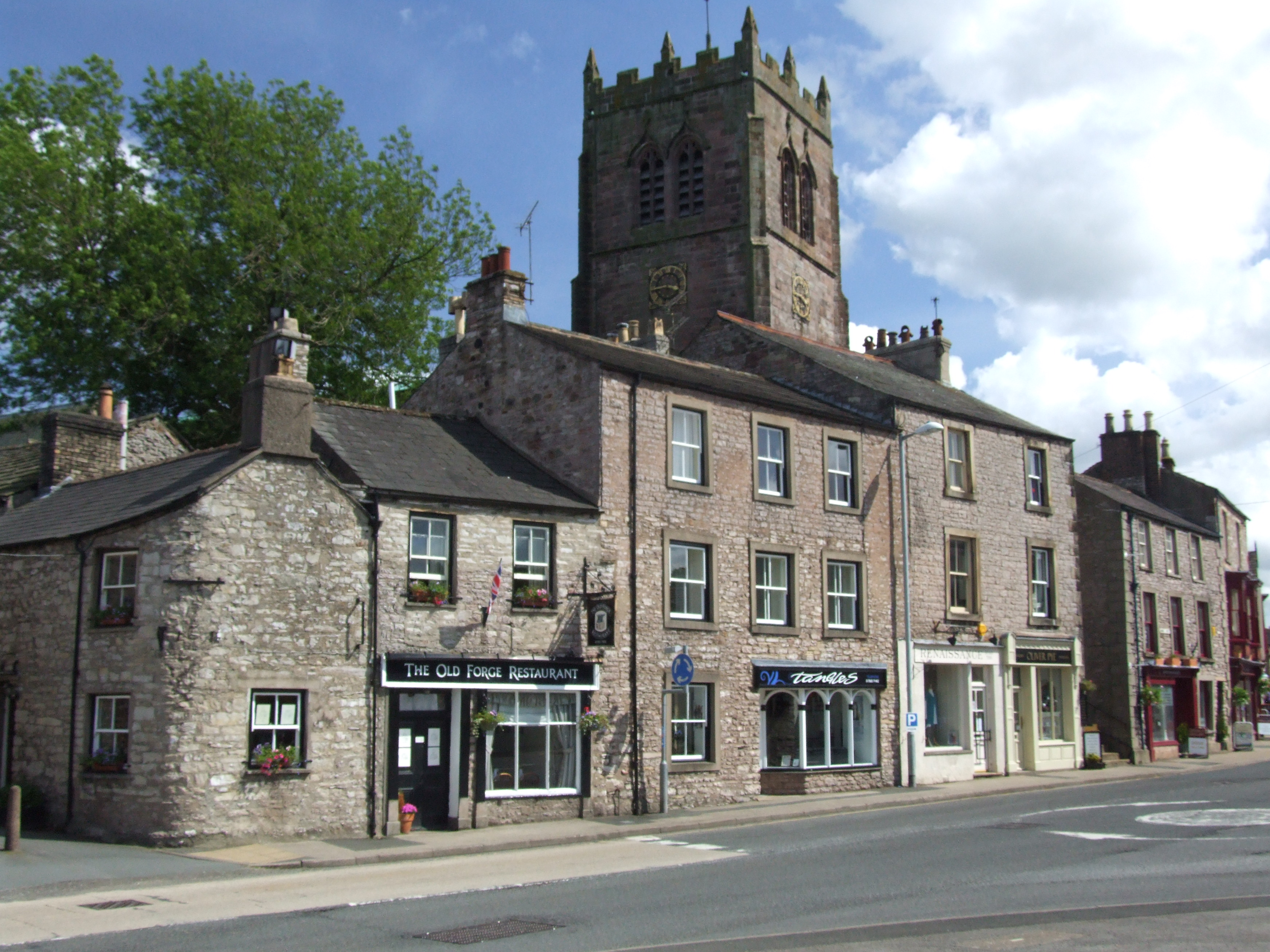
- A view over North Road and the Old Forge, with the parish church in the background

- Location in the former Eden District Location within Cumbria
- Population: 1,895 (2021 census)
- OS grid reference: NY7708
- Civil parish: Kirkby Stephen
- Unitary authority: Westmorland and Furness
- Ceremonial county: Cumbria
- Region: North West
- Country: England
- Sovereign state: United Kingdom
- Post town: KIRKBY STEPHEN
- Postcode district: CA17
- Dialling code: 01768
- Police: Cumbria
- Fire: Cumbria
- Ambulance: North West
- UK Parliament: Westmorland and Lonsdale

Kirkby Stephen (/ˈkɜːrbi/) is a market town and civil parish in Westmorland and Furness, Cumbria, England. It lies on the A685 and is surrounded by sparsely populated hill country, about 25 miles (40 km) from the nearest larger towns, Kendal and Penrith. The River Eden rises 6 miles (10 km) away in the peat bogs below Hugh Seat and passes the eastern edge of the town. At the 2021 census, the parish had a population of 1,895.

The name Kirkby derives from the Old Norse kirkju-býr meaning 'village with a church'. The Stephen part of the name is thought to derive from either the church (which may have previously been dedicated to St Stephen) or from a medieval abbot called Stephen.

== Market ==
In 1352–1353, Roger de Clifford, Baron of Westmorland, obtained a charter from King Edward III for a market and two annual fairs to be held in the town. This was reaffirmed by a charter granted in 1605 to George, Earl of Cumberland, by King James I, for "one market on Monday and two fairs yearly; one on the Wednesday, Thursday and Friday after Whitsuntide and the other on the two days next before the feast of St Luke."

The Monday market, with livestock sales at the Mart in Faraday Road and stalls on Market Square, remains an important event in the town and surrounding countryside. There were special celebrations to mark the 400th anniversary of the King James charter. St Luke's Fair, or Charter Day, is celebrated every year at the end of October, when the Charter is read at the Charter Stone in Market Street. The special Tup sales, very important in this sheep-rearing area, still take place around this time each year.

== Facilities ==
The town has a range of shops: several antique shops, restaurants, cafés, pubs, and an Upper Eden Visitor Centre. Kirkby Stephen has won several awards from Cumbria/Britain in Bloom.

Kirkby Stephen serves as a base for tourism in the Upper Eden Valley area and for walking tours of the Valley. It is on the route of the Coast to Coast Walk, devised by Alfred Wainwright in 1973. Each June there is held the "Mallerstang Horseshoe and Nine Standards Yomp", which takes a strenuous route along the high ground on both sides of the neighbouring dale of Mallerstang, including Wild Boar Fell and the summit of nearby Nine Standards Rigg.

The surrounding countryside attracts walkers. There is a Kirkby Stephen Mountain Rescue Team to assist those not fully prepared for harsh conditions on the fell tops.

The community and council centre in the library provides information and services for all local councils: county, district and parish.

== Parish church ==
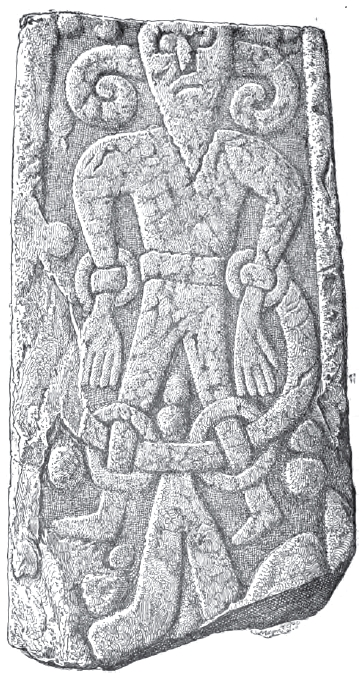
Early medieval carving of Loki

A church has stood on the site of the present parish church since the Anglo-Saxon period, and a cross shaft depicting Loki, the Norse god, survives from this period (right). The earliest fabric in the current building is Norman, however most dates from c. 1230 and the nineteenth century, when the chancel and other parts of the church were rebuilt or restored. The tower is sixteenth century.

== Schools ==
There are primary schools in Kirkby Stephen and in the neighbouring parishes of Brough and Ravenstonedale.

Secondary education for the town and surrounding area is provided by Kirkby Stephen Grammar School. This was founded in 1566 by Thomas Wharton, 1st Baron Wharton, under letters patent granted by Queen Elizabeth I. Although it has retained the name "grammar school", its old buildings were replaced long ago, and it is now a comprehensive school and Sports College with about 410 pupils. The grounds of the grammar school included for a time an open-air swimming pool built in the 1960s for the school and local community, which was open from May to August to members of the Kirkby Stephen and District Swimming Club and to visitors to the area.

== Governance ==
For local government purposes, Kirkby Stephen is in the unitary authority area of Westmorland and Furness. It was historically in the county of Westmorland. The settlement also has a town council.

An electoral ward in the same name stretches south to Aisgill, At the 2021 Census, the town had a population of 1,895. which was previously estimated to have been 1,647 in 2019.

The town is in the parliamentary constituency of Westmorland and Lonsdale.

== Media ==
Local news and television programmes are provided by BBC North East and Cumbria and ITV Border. Television signals are received from the Caldbeck and local relay transmitters.

Local radio stations are BBC Radio Cumbria, Greatest Hits Radio Cumbria & South West Scotland and Dales Radio.

The town is served by the local newspapers, Cumberland and Westmorland Herald and The Westmorland Gazette.

== Scenic highlights ==
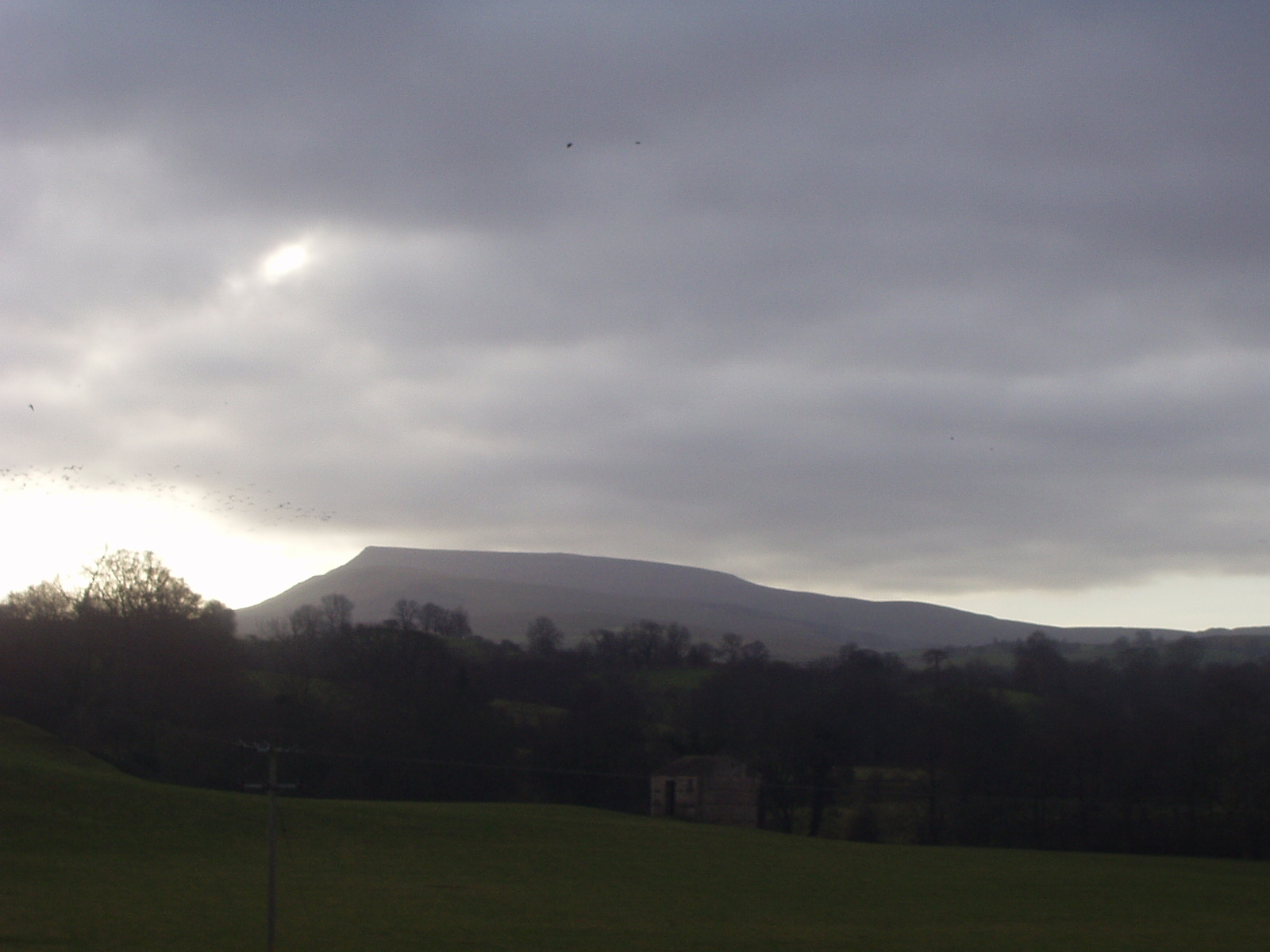
The view of Wild Boar Fell

- Stenkrith Park is to the south of the town, on the B6259 road to Nateby. The river scenery marks a change from limestone at the head of the Eden Valley in Mallerstang to the red sandstone characteristic further along the Eden Valley. The main rock, from which most houses in Kirkby Stephen are built, is brockram, composed of fragments of limestone in a cement of red sandstone. The river at Stenkrith has carved this rock into many fantastic shapes, collectively known as the Devil's Grinding Mill or Devil's Hole. This natural scenery has been supplemented, in recent years, by three human additions.
- The Poetry Path has 12 stones, which were carved by the artist Pip Hall. They bear poems by Meg Peacock that depict a year in the life of a hill farmer.
- Eden Benchmark: Beside the river there is a sculpture by Laura White, entitled "Passage", one of the ten "Eden Benchmarks", a series of sculptures that have been placed at intervals along the River Eden from its source in Mallerstang to the Solway Firth.
- The Millennium Bridge, opened in 2002, provides pedestrian access from the park to a walk along the old south Durham railway track.

Other scenic features in the area include Nine Standards Rigg to the north-east Pendragon Castle and Wild Boar Fell to the south.

Unlike neighbouring Brough, Kirkby shows no evidence of Roman settlement. However, there are many traces of much more ancient eras in the area, including remains of a large Iron Age earthwork or hill fort known as Croglam Castle, on the south-eastern edge of the town.

== Yomp Mountain Challenge ==
The Yomp Mountain Challenge started in 1983, is a 23 mile fell running and walking event following the River Eden’s watershed along the high ground on both sides of the neighbouring dale of Mallerstang, including Wild Boar Fell and the summit of nearby Nine Standards Rigg. Originally inspired by local business owner Peter Denby to honour the efforts of British troops in the Falkland Islands conflict with Argentina, the route was designed by local fell runner Richard Sewell and first walked by a small group of enthusiasts, which included Richard, Glyn Robinson, Ray Myers and a number of others, with Mr Denby in support. It was then adopted by the Rotary Club as an annual fund raising event and during the early years was strongly supported by team entries from both the regular British Army and the TA. It later became registered with the Fell Runners Association and whilst the June fell running calendar was already quite full, the Yomp has over the years attracted some top fell runners, with the long course record being held for many years by Sedbergh fell runner Paul Tuson. It has recently been taken on by a new volunteer team and offers a number of other length races held over the same weekend. It has grown into a multi-day outdoor festival centered at The Engine Shed in Pennine View Park, the classic "marathon" route is now slightly longer after this change.

== Transport ==
Kirkby Stephen West station, on the Settle–Carlisle line, is located over 1 mile (2 km) south-west of the town. The line keeps to high ground, avoiding any descent into the valleys where possible.

A second, older railway station is Kirkby Stephen East station at the southern edge of the town. Originally a large junction of the South Durham & Lancashire Union Railway and the Eden Valley Railway, the station was reopened by the Stainmore Railway Company in August 2011 as a heritage centre and operational railway representing the 1950s. It is open to visitors every weekend.

Kirkby Stephen’s buses are run by Stagecoach in Cumbria.

== Gallery ==
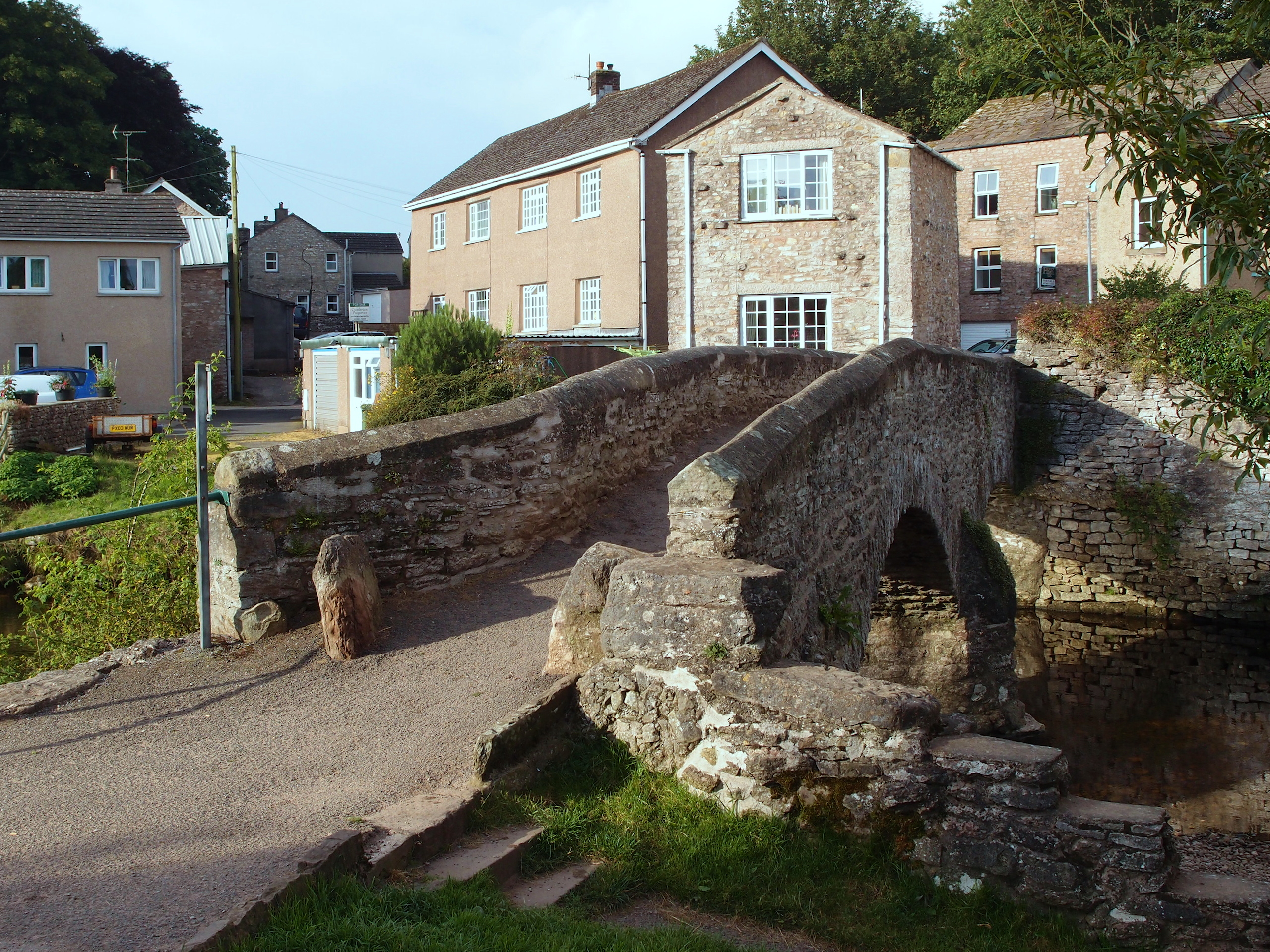
Frank's Bridge

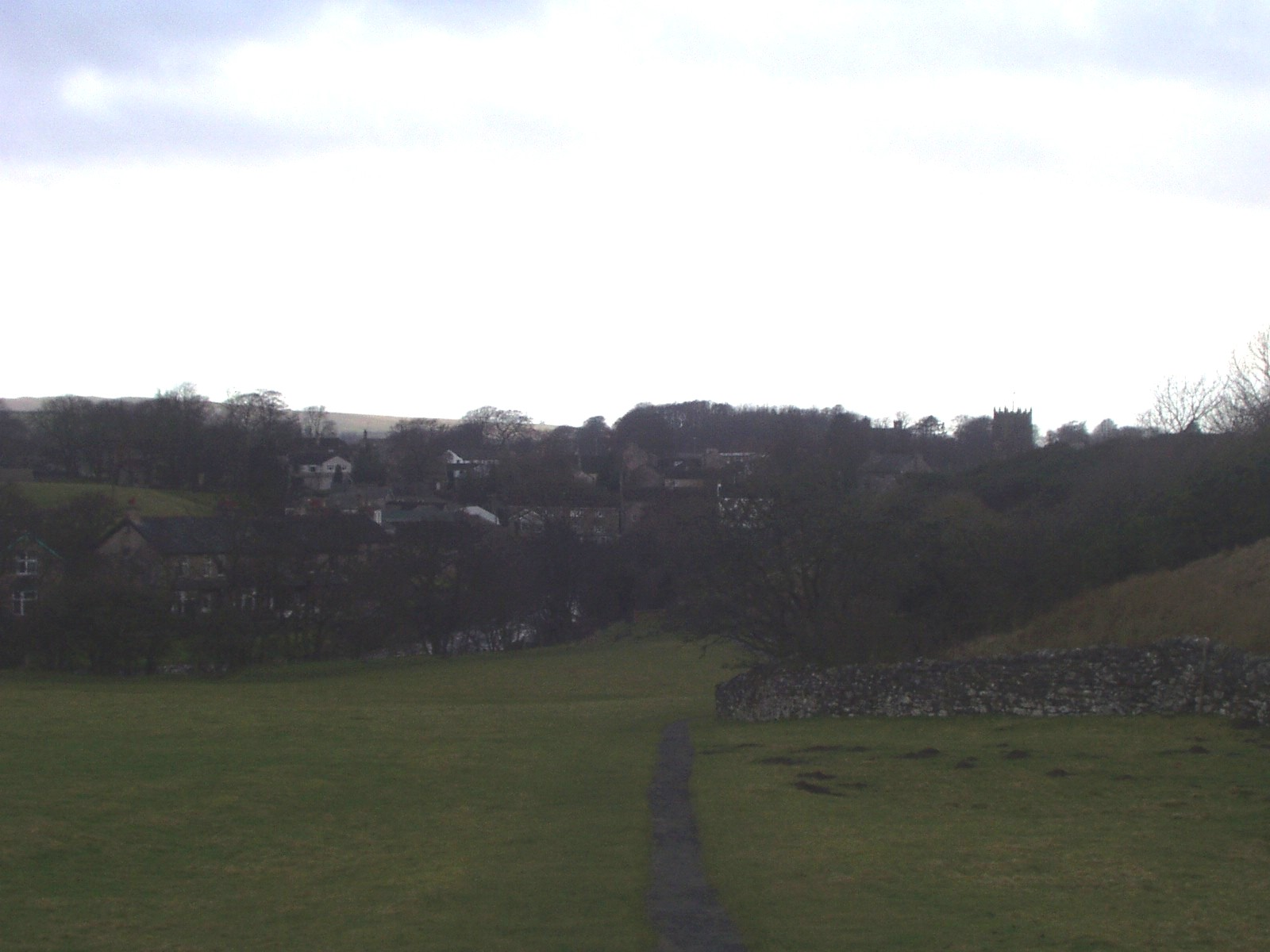
Kirkby Stephen from the path to Hartley

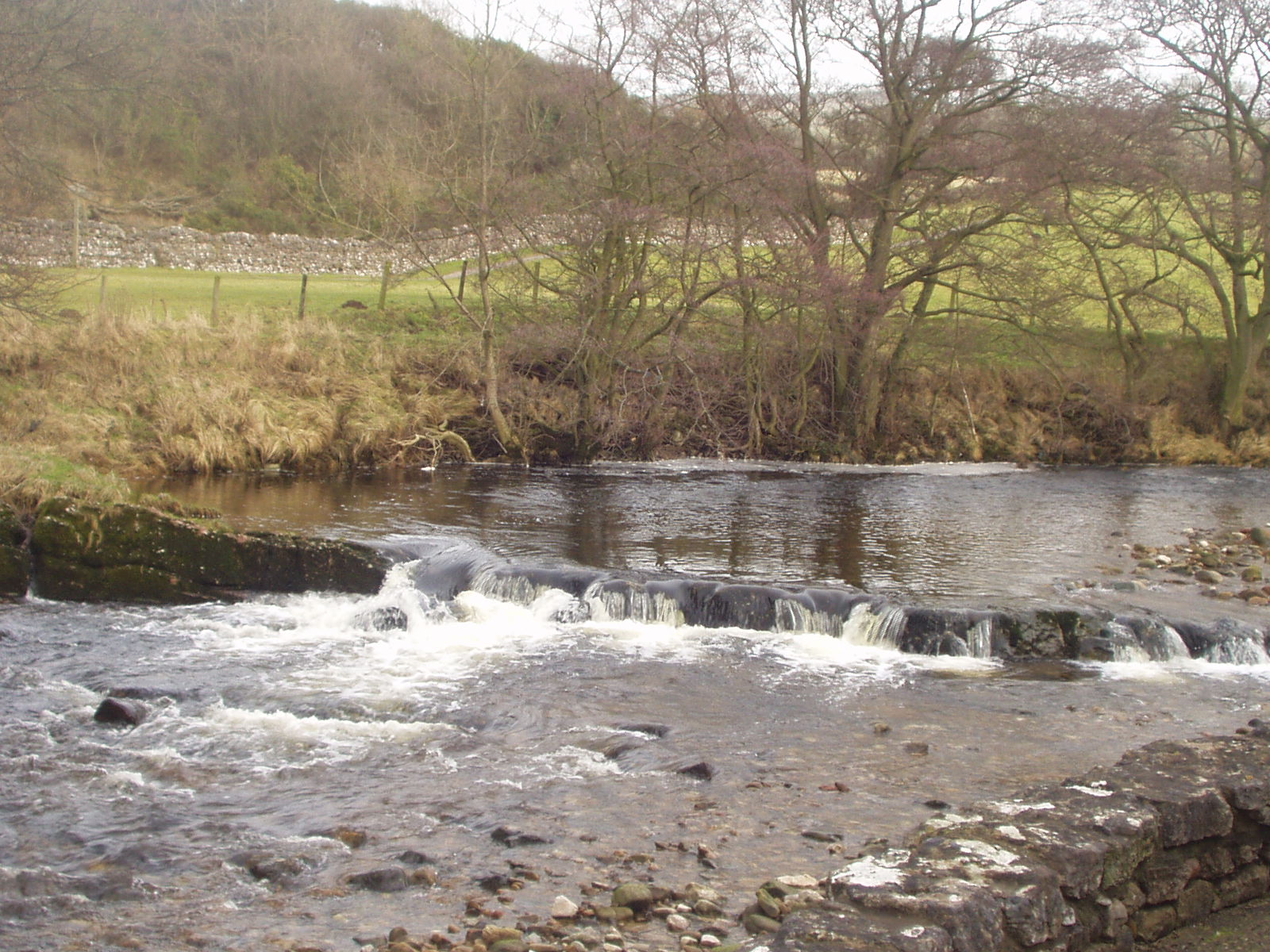
River Eden through Kirkby Stephen.

== See also ==
- Listed buildings in Kirkby Stephen
- List of English and Welsh endowed schools (19th century)
