= Eden Sike Cave =

Cave in Cumbria, England

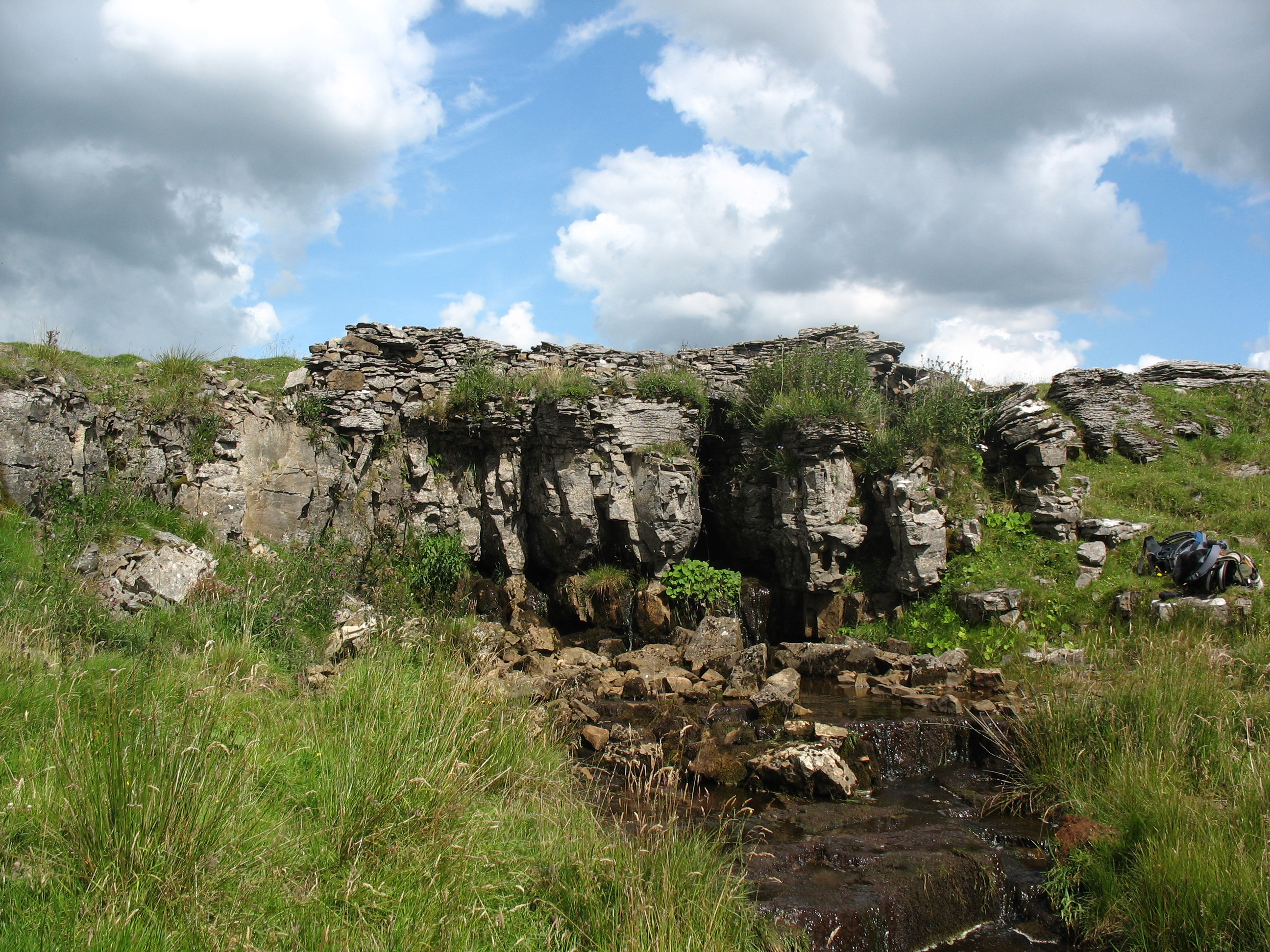
- The Resurgence for Eden Sike Cave

- Location within Cumbria
- Location: Mallerstang, Cumbria, UK
- OS grid: SD 7822 9701
- Coordinates: 54°22′05″N 2°20′12″W
- Length: 772 metres (2,533 ft)
- Elevation: 397 metres (1,302 ft)
- Geology: Carboniferous limestone
- Entrances: 1
- Difficulty: II
- Cave survey: Northern Pennine Club 1960

Eden Sike Cave is a small cave in Mallerstang in the Eden valley in Cumbria, England 400 metres (440 yd) north of Hell Gill. The entrance is 391 metres (428 yd) north west of an obvious resurgence in a small shakehole. This drops into a passage where a wet crawl leads downstream towards the resurgence, and a roomier passage going upstream. The upstream passage soon deteriorates into more awkward going which eventually passes a small but awkward climb into an inlet passage up to the right. The main passage goes to a sump some 9 metres (30 ft) long which has been passed to a further 15 metres (49 ft) before becoming too tight. The right-hand passage passes a section of sharp, steeply angled rock (Bacon Slicer Rift) into a chamber where the way on is a tight, wet passage where the airspace becomes minimal.

The cave was originally explored by members of the Northern Pennine Club in 1960, and extended in 1982 by Ian Broadhurst and Dave Lamont. The sump was dived by members of the Cave Diving Group in 1975.
