= High Seat (Yorkshire Dales) =

Mountain in Cumbria, England

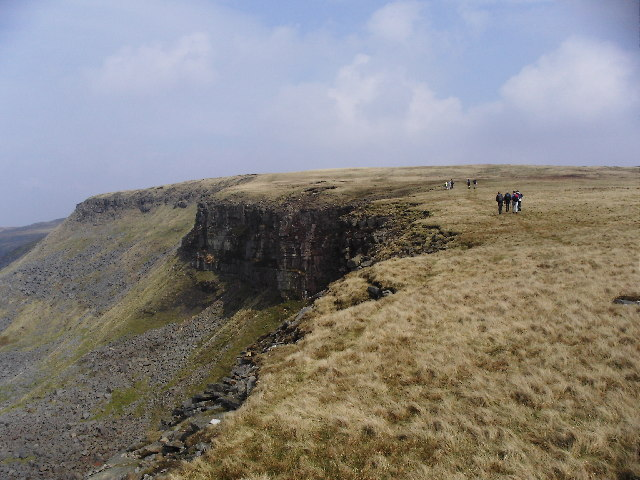
- The escarpment of Mallerstang Edge - High Seat is away to the right

Highest point
- Elevation: 709 m (2,326 ft)
- Prominence: 112 m (367 ft)
- Listing: Hewitt, Nuttall, HuMP.
- Coordinates: 54°24′22″N 2°18′18″W

Geography
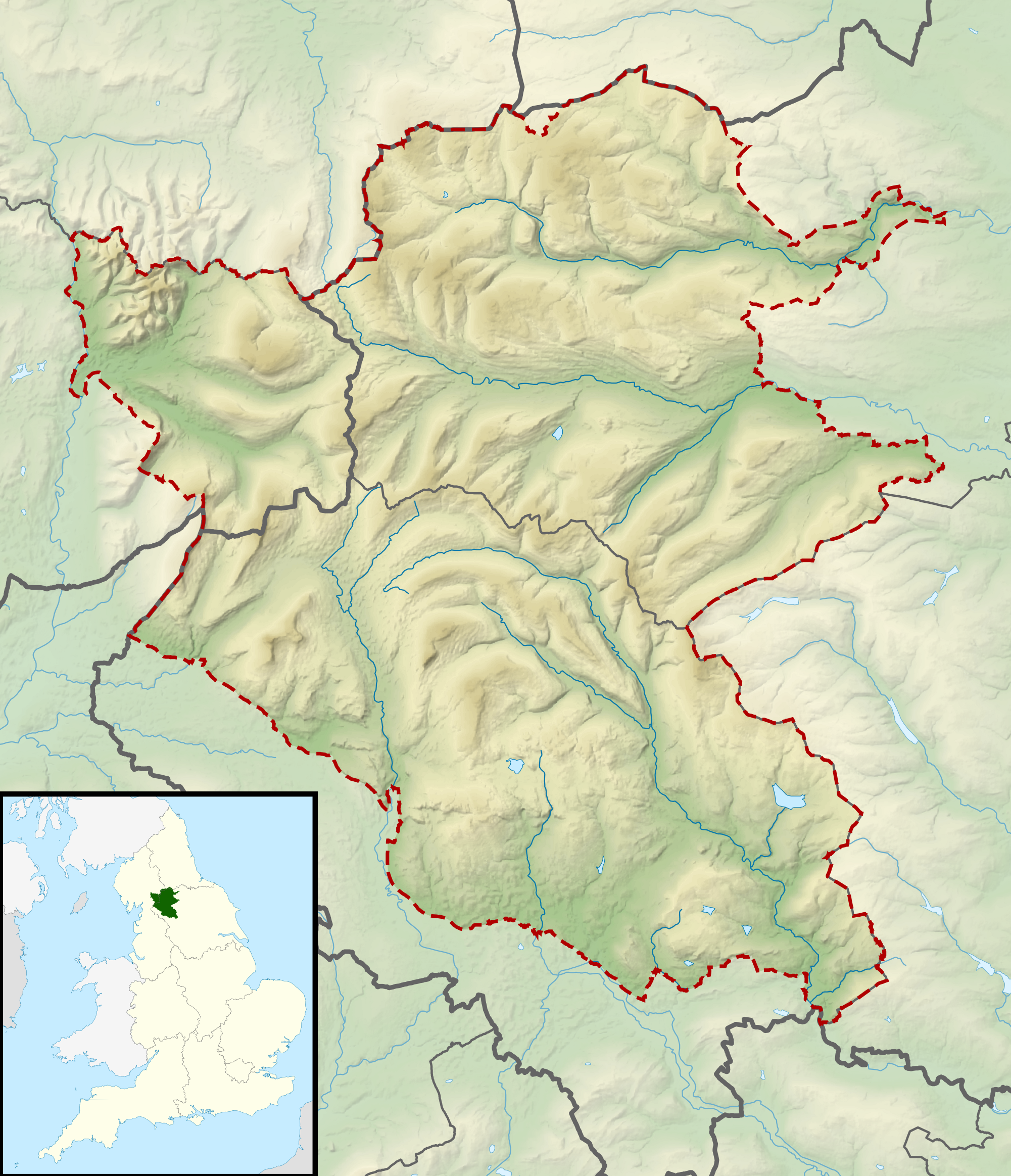
- Location within Yorkshire Dales
- Location: Yorkshire Dales, England
- OS grid: NY 802 012
- Topo map: OS Landrangers 91, 92

High Seat is a fell in the dale of Mallerstang, Cumbria. With a summit at 709 metres (2,326 ft), it is the fourth highest fell in the Yorkshire Dales after Whernside, Ingleborough and Great Shunner Fell. It is in the north-western part of the Dales, overlooking the deep trench of Mallerstang, and is usually climbed from this side.

To the south-east is Hugh Seat (whose summit is marked by Lady Anne's Pillar, commemorating Sir Hugh de Morville). On the opposite (western) side of Mallerstang is the more striking (but 1 metre lower) Wild Boar Fell.

It is not a Marilyn, having a relative height of 112 m, and therefore may be regarded as a subsidiary top of Great Shunner Fell, to the east. It is, however, a HuMP.

Oddly enough, it is the highest point on the main England east-to-west watershed in the Dales, the three higher fells being some distance from the watershed.

Three main rivers have their origins in the peat bogs here: the River Eden, the River Swale, and the River Ure.

== See also ==
- Wild Boar Fell
