= Gill (ravine) =

Ravine or narrow valley in the North of England and other parts of the United Kingdom

A gill or ghyll is a ravine or narrow valley in the North of England and parts of Scotland. The word originates from the Old Norse gil. Examples include Dufton Ghyll Wood, Dungeon Ghyll, Troller's Gill and Trow Ghyll. As a related usage, Gaping Gill is the name of a cave, not the associated stream, and Cowgill, Masongill and Halton Gill are derived names of villages.

In South East England, the High Weald gills are deeply cut ravines, usually with a stream in the base which eroded the ravine. These gills may be up to 200 feet (61 m) deep, which represents a significant physiographic feature in lowland England.

The stream flowing through a gill is often referred to as a beck: for example in Swaledale, Gunnerside Beck flows through Gunnerside Ghyll. Beck is also used as a more general term for streams in Yorkshire, Cumbria, south Durham and north Lancashire – examples include Ais Gill Beck, Arkle Beck and Peasey Beck. There are also examples in Norfolk, including Hagon Beck, Scarrow Beck and Gur Beck. In the North Pennines, the word sike or syke is found in similar circumstances. This is particularly common in the Appleby Fells area where sikes significantly outnumber the becks and gills; it can also be seen in the name of Eden Sike Cave in Mallerstang.

== See also ==
- Brook (stream)
- List of generic forms in British place names
- Cumbrian placename etymology
- Category:Beck watercourses
