= Swarth Fell =

Hill in Northern England

- Swarth Fell from Wild Boar Fell

Highest point
- Elevation: 681 m (2,234 ft)
- Prominence: 76 m (249 ft)
- Parent peak: Wild Boar Fell
- Listing: Hewitt, Nuttall
- Coordinates: 54.36487°N 2.37741°W

Geography
- Location: Mallerstang, Cumbria, England
- Parent range: Pennines
- OS grid: SD7557596660
- Topo map: OS Landranger 98

Swarth Fell is an approximately 1-mile (1.6 km) stretch of high ground (consisting mainly of limestone capped with millstone grit) situated to the south of Wild Boar Fell, of which it is a continuation. It is mostly within Mallerstang, Cumbria, but the boundary between Cumbria and North Yorkshire (historically Westmorland and the West Riding of Yorkshire) runs along its length, just to the west of the highest points.

Swarth Fell in evening sunlight, seen from Mallerstang, looking south.

The summit, (681 metres (2,234 ft)) which is marked by a cairn, and is listed as both a Hewitt and a Nuttall, lies 2.1 km to the south of the summit of Wild Boar Fell, the two fells being separated by a col - where there are several cairns, and a small tarn; Swarth Fell Tarn. (This small tarn can just be seen in the photograph above right). Historically, the tarn was unnamed, and Alfred Wainwright described it as "a small, nameless sheet of water." In 2017, the Ordnance Survey agreed to label the tarn on maps as Swarth Fell Tarn.

The name "Swarth" fell, like most of the names of geographical features in the area, is of Norse origin: svartr, dark in colour.

Approximately 1 km south-east of the summit is the fell's other high point, Swarth Fell Pike (651 metres (2,136 ft)). Baugh Fell, Yorkshire Dales, is 5.3 km to the south-west, separated from Swarth Fell by Grisedale.
