= Mallerstang =

Civil parish in Cumbria, England

Coordinates: 54.40848°N 2.33737°W

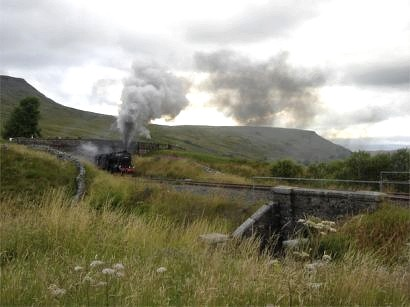
- A steam train at Aisgill on the Settle–Carlisle line

- Location within Cumbria
- Population: 173 (2011 (including Wharton))
- OS grid reference: NY782015
- Civil parish: Mallerstang
- Unitary authority: Westmorland and Furness
- Ceremonial county: Cumbria
- Region: North West
- Country: England
- Sovereign state: United Kingdom
- Post town: KIRKBY STEPHEN
- Postcode district: CA17
- Dialling code: 01768
- Police: Cumbria
- Fire: Cumbria
- Ambulance: North West
- UK Parliament: Westmorland and Lonsdale

Mallerstang is a civil parish in the extreme east of Cumbria, and, geographically, a dale at the head of the upper Eden Valley. Originally part of Westmorland, it lies about 6 miles (9.7 km) south of the nearest town, Kirkby Stephen. Its eastern edge, at Aisgill, borders on North Yorkshire; and since August 2016 it has been within the Yorkshire Dales National Park.

At the 2011 census, data for Wharton was included with Mallerstang, giving a total population of 173.

== Toponymy ==
The name Mallerstang is first attested in 1223, in the form Malrestang, alongside Malvestang in 1228, and Malverstang in 1462. The first part of the name comes from the Common Brittonic words found in modern Welsh as moel ("bare") and bre ("hill"). Thus this part of the name once meant "bare hill". That place-name was then the basis for the addition of Old Norse stǫng ("pole") to create a name that once meant "post at Maller". This presumably referred to a waymarker or landmark.

== The head of the Eden ==
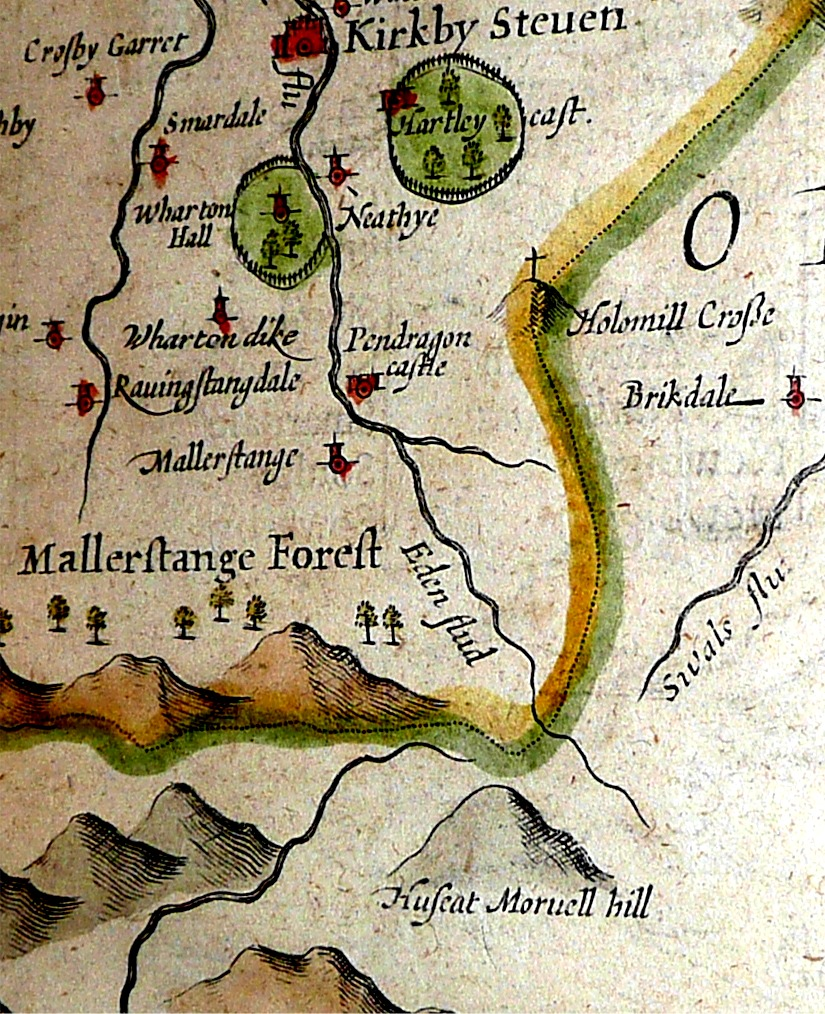
Mallerstang (showing Hugh Seat as "Huseat Morvel hill"); from a 1610 map of Westmorland by John Speede

This narrow valley at the head of the River Eden is bounded by Wild Boar Fell and Swarth Fell to the west and Mallerstang Edge to the east.

The highest point of Mallerstang Edge is the summit of High Seat; at 709 metres (2,326 ft) this is a metre or so higher than the more prominent Wild Boar Fell. The other main high points on the eastern side of the dale are the curiously named Gregory Chapel, south of High Seat, and Hugh Seat to the south-east.

The river Eden rises as Red Gill Beck in Black Moss, the peat bogs below Hugh Seat. A little further downstream the river becomes Hellgill Beck. It traditionally takes the name 'Eden' below the waterfall Hell Gill Force, after it has been joined by Aisgill Beck, which flows down from Wild Boar Fell. The Ordnance Survey places the name change further upstream, beyond the diffluence of the Eden Sike which flows into Eden Sike Cave, one of a number of caves in the area.

Mallerstang, like many other Pennine dales, reflects the settlement pattern set a thousand years ago by its Norse settlers, whose language is still evident in the names of many of its geographical features.

== Some notable historical people and events ==
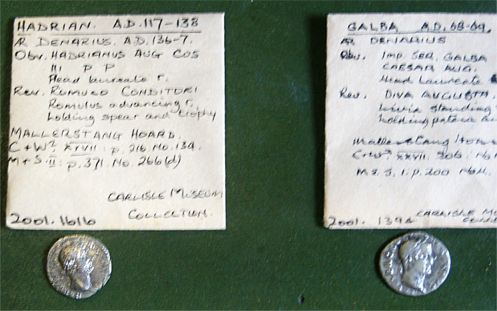
Two coins from the "Mallerstang Hoard" – from the reigns of the Emperors Hadrian and Galba; now in Carlisle

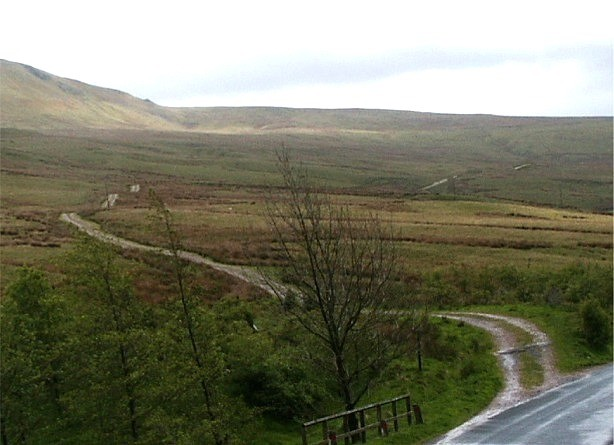
The Old Highway (Lady Anne's Way), leaving the B6259 at Boggle Green, Mallerstang

The dale is closely associated with Lady Anne Clifford, and the ancient road to the east of the river is now part of a long-distance path known as Lady Anne's Way in memory of the Countess of Pembroke, who often travelled along this track while moving between her many castles. It is, however, much older than this and was used by the Romans as a route between Wensleydale and their forts along what is now the A66. A local shepherd found a hoard of Roman coins on Mallerstang Edge near the highway in 1927. (The "Mallerstang hoard" is now in the Tullie House Museum in Carlisle.) But the Romans were using a track that had existed at least since the Bronze Age, and there is evidence for even earlier use in recent finds of flint tools nearby.

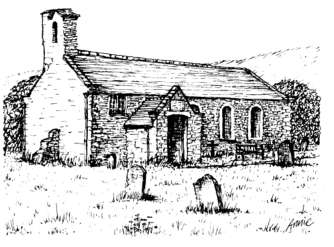
St Mary's Church, Outhgill

St Mary's Church in Outhgill was founded in the early 14th century by another powerful patroness, Lady Idonea de Veteripont – but, having fallen into disrepair, was restored by Lady Anne in 1663 (as a plaque over the door records).

Pendragon Castle, was also restored (in fact more or less rebuilt) by Lady Anne in 1660. According to legend it is supposed to have been built by Uther Pendragon, father of King Arthur. Whether there is any substance to these old legends will probably never be settled, and there is no evidence from the limited archaeological investigations for any building here before the Norman castle built in the reign of King William Rufus. The castle was one of Lady Anne Clifford's favourite places. But her heir, the Earl of Thanet, abandoned it; and over the next three centuries it gradually deteriorated.

One of the other notable Lords of the Manor was Sir Hugh de Morville, Lord of Westmorland. He was one of the four knights who murdered St Thomas Becket in Canterbury Cathedral in 1170, and legend says that he took refuge here afterwards before being banished to France. (Hugh Seat is named after him, and Wild Boar Fell, as seen from beyond the castle to the north, is said to have haunted him because in certain lights its profile strongly suggests a face and mitre: the recumbent St Thomas.)

On 24 February 1537 ten men from Mallerstang were hanged in the dale for taking part in the Pilgrimage of Grace. The local protesters had gathered at Lammerside Castle, just north of Mallerstang, and joined the 6000 men who marched through Westmorland towards Carlisle. This uprising against King Henry VIII was put down by a military force commanded by Thomas Howard, 3rd Duke of Norfolk, aided by Sir Thomas Wharton, 1st Baron Wharton (whose seat, Wharton Hall, lies just to the north of the parish). From the many prisoners taken, 74 were picked out to be executed in their own villages.

The tradition of dissent was still alive in the 17th century when ten or more families in the dale became Quakers – at a time when all non-conformists suffered considerable persecution. The grandson of one of these Quaker families, George Birkbeck, set up the "Mechanics Institute" in London, which later became Birkbeck College of the University of London. The Quakers' strong influence in the area continued until the Wesleyans largely replaced it in the 19th century.

Two brothers from Clapham, North Yorkshire, moved to the area in the late 18th century. Richard Faraday became a notable businessman in Kirkby Stephen, where a road is named after him. His younger brother, James, set up as a blacksmith in Outhgill (in the house now called Faraday Cottage). As he moved to London a year before their third child was born, the area narrowly missed being able to claim the great scientist Michael Faraday as a Mallerstang man.

== The Settle–Carlisle Line ==
Aisgill Viaduct, Mallerstang, on the Settle–Carlisle line

The most conspicuous structure in the dale is the Settle–Carlisle Railway, built between 1869 and 1876, and one of the last great engineering works in Britain to be built almost entirely by muscle power. It was constructed at great cost not only of money but also of human life. Twenty-five of those who died during the construction of this section of the line (both builders and members of their families) are buried in unmarked graves in the churchyard of St. Mary's. A memorial to them was erected there in 1997.

== The people of the Dale ==
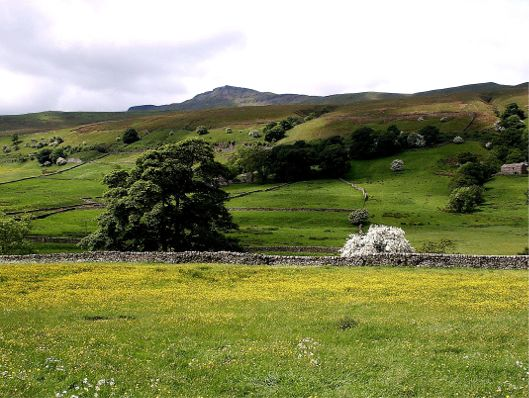
Wild Boar Fell in June, with wild flowers in the hay meadows.

From the time of its Norse settlers until the mid-20th century, farming was the main occupation in the dale. There are also the inconspicuous remains of some small-scale coal and lead mining, but this was never very profitable and did not survive beyond the 19th century. Historically the population varied between about 250 and 350.

During the 20th century, as the small farms merged, and as machinery reduced the need for manpower, the population gradually declined. By mid-century it reached a low point of about 50, but since the late 1970s the remaining farming families have been joined by many "off-comers" attracted by the scenery to make their homes here, and the population doubled again from its lowest point. Even though it is remote from most 21st-century amenities, Mallerstang has survived as a community, with many of its ancient traditions intact.

== Mallerstang Parish Meeting ==
The population, with 101 on the electoral register (March 2011), is too small to entitle Mallerstang to have a Parish Council, and it has no representation by elected councillors in the nearest town, Kirkby Stephen. Constitutionally, the civil parish has the status of a parish meeting, the lowest tier of Local Government in England. (A civil parish is quite separate from the Church of England's parochial organisation.) Three Officers are elected annually by those on the electoral register: the Parish Chair, a vice-Chair, and the Parish Clerk (who serves as both secretary and treasurer). Parish Meetings are held at least three times a year: in March, June and November (with a provision for extra meetings, if called for). The meetings are open to all residents, and those who are on the electoral register for Mallerstang may speak and vote on all matters.

The budget for the coming year and a 'parish precept' (an amount added to the Council Tax specifically for Mallerstang) are agreed at the November meeting. Parish officers are elected at the Annual Parish Meeting, held on the Thursday nearest to 25 March. (By tradition, past residents, especially those who have died during the year, are commemorated at this meeting.) At the June meeting the annual parish accounts are presented; this meeting also includes an annual report on the historic Mallerstang Charities. Among its other activities, the Parish Meeting has a Village Green Committee, and a Red Squirrel Committee, a group who are doing their best to conserve and protect the dale's small but thriving population of native red squirrels.

== See also ==
- Listed buildings in Mallerstang
