= River Eden, Cumbria =

River in Cumbria, England

Eden Ituna (Roman name)
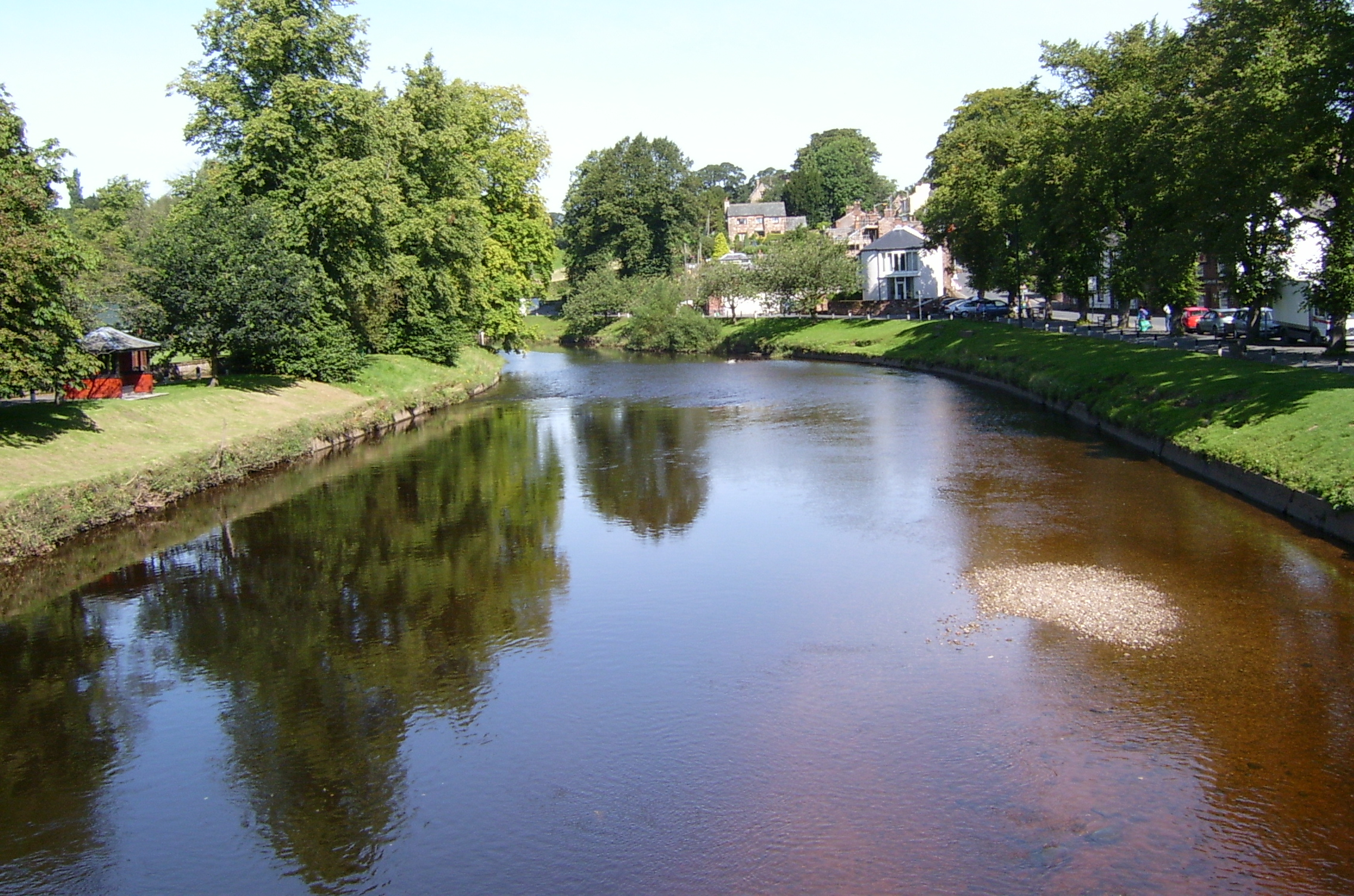
- The Eden at Appleby-in-Westmorland

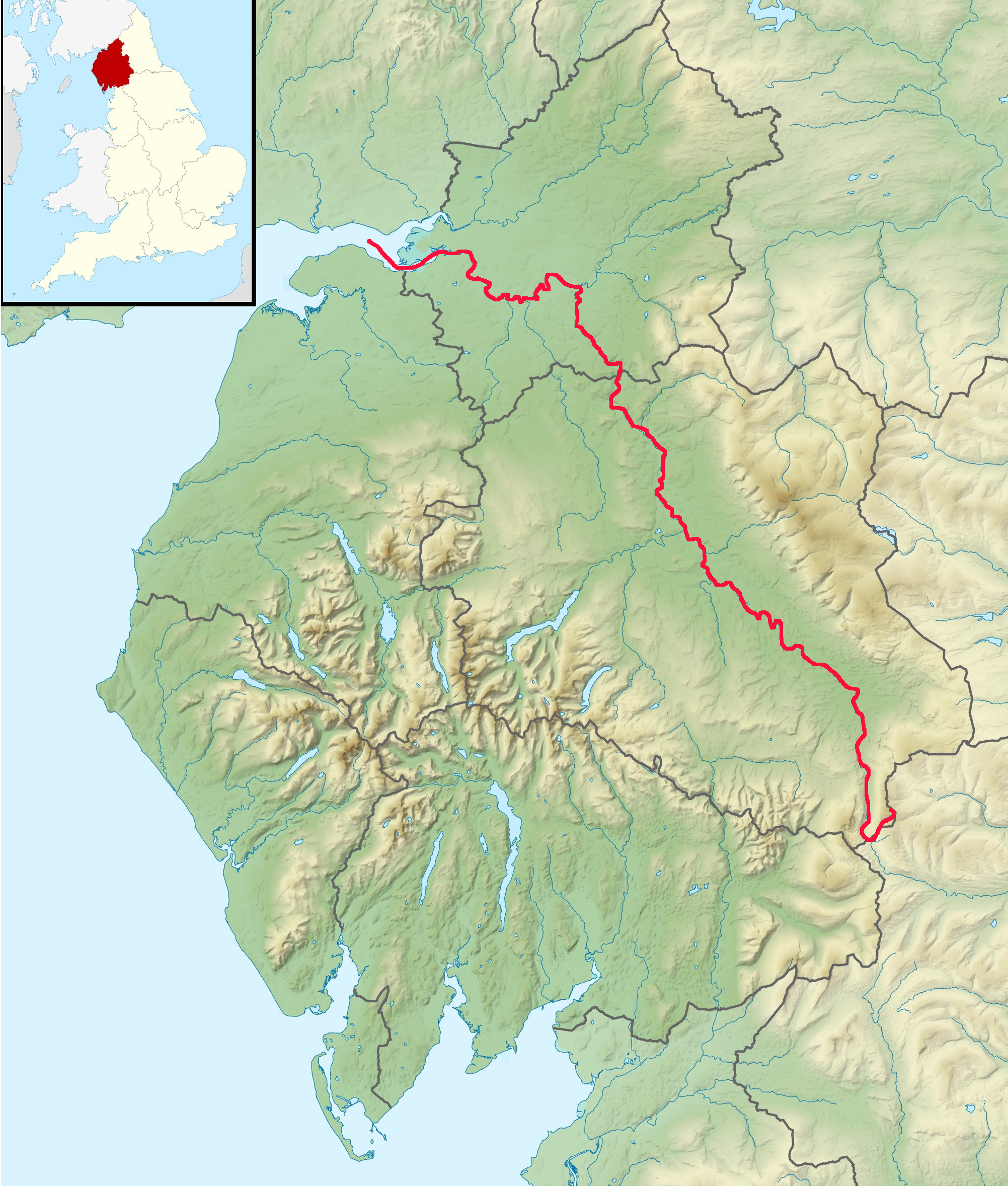
- The River Eden is highlighted in red.
- Etymology: Celtic water or rushing

Location
- Country: United Kingdom
- Constituent country: England
- County: Cumbria; North Yorkshire; Cumberland (historical); Westmorland (historical); Yorkshire (historical)

Physical characteristics
- Source
  - location: Black Fell Moss, Mallerstang
  - coordinates: 54.3936°N 2.3014°W
  - elevation: 670 m (2,200 ft)
- Mouth: Solway Firth
  - location: Bowness-on-Solway
  - coordinates: 54.9556°N 3.3252°W
  - elevation: 0 m (0 ft)
- Length: 145 km (90 mi)
- Discharge
  - location: Sheepmount, Cumberland
  - average: 51.82 m^{3}/s (1,830 cu ft/s)
  - maximum: 1,700 m^{3}/s (60,000 cu ft/s)maximum discharge in Dec 2015
- Discharge
  - location: Temple Sowerby
  - average: 14.44 m^{3}/s (510 cu ft/s)

Basin features
- Tributaries
  - left: Caldew, Petteril, Eamont
  - right: Irthing

The River Eden is a river that flows through Cumbria, England. It rises on Black Fell Moss, near the village of Outhgill, and runs in a generally north-westerly direction through the Vale of Eden and Solway Plain before reaching the sea at the Solway Firth. It forms the core of the River Eden and Tributaries SSSI.

== Etymology ==
The river was known to the Romans as the Itouna, as recorded by the Greek geographer Claudius Ptolemaeus (Ptolemy) in the 2nd century AD. This name derives from the Celtic word ituna, meaning water, or rushing. Thus, there is no relation to the biblical Garden of Eden.

== Course of river ==
The Eden rises in Black Fell Moss, Mallerstang, on the high ground between High Seat, Yorkshire Dales and Hugh Seat. Here it forms the boundary between the counties of Cumbria and North Yorkshire; the river gave its name to the former Eden district of Cumbria. Two other rivers arise in the same peat bogs here, within a kilometre of each other: the River Swale and River Ure.

It starts life as Red Gill Beck, then becomes Hell Gill Beck, before turning north and joining with Ais Gill Beck to become the River Eden. (Hell Gill Force, just before it meets Ais Gill Beck, is the highest waterfall along its journey to the sea).

The steep-sided dale of Mallerstang later opens out to become the Vale of Eden. The river flows through Kirkby Stephen and Appleby-in-Westmorland, and receives the water of many becks flowing off the Pennines to the east, and longer rivers from the Lake District off to the west, including the River Lyvennet, River Leith and River Eamont, which arrives via Ullswater and Penrith.

Continuing north, it formed the eastern boundary of Inglewood Forest. It passes close to the ancient stone circle known as Long Meg and Her Daughters and through the sparsely populated beef and dairy farming regions of the vale of Cumbria on the Solway Plain. After flowing through Wetheral, where it is crossed by Corby Bridge, a Grade I listed railway viaduct of 1834, it merges with the River Irthing from the east, followed by the River Petteril and River Caldew from the south, as it winds through Carlisle.

Its junction with the River Caldew in north Carlisle marks the point where Hadrian's Wall crosses the Eden, only five miles before both reach their end at the tidal flats. It enters the Solway Firth near the mouth of the River Esk after a total distance of approximately 81 miles (130 km).

== Catchment ==
For catchment management purposes, the Eden forms part of the Eden and Esk Management Catchment. Within that, the Eden Upper catchment extends from the source to its confluence with the River Eamont east of Penrith. The Eden Lower catchment extends from there to the Solway.

== Ecology ==
The river supports Atlantic salmon (Salmo salar) and Eurasian otter (Lutra lutra). The river and its tributaries are designated a Special Area of Conservation under the European Union's Habitats Directive. The area protected by the SAC includes Ullswater. Within the Eden Upper operational catchment, Eden - headwaters to Scandal Beck Water Body has good ecological status. So does Eden - Scandal Beck to Lyvennet Water Body. Eden Lyvennet to Eamont Water Body has Moderate ecological status. In Eden Lower, Eden - Eamont to tidal Water Body has Moderate ecological status.

== See also ==
- List of Sites of Special Scientific Interest in Cumbria

== Bibliography ==
- Capel, Dick (2020). The Stream Invites Us to Follow. Saraband. ISBN 9781912235841.
- Hamilton, John (1999) [1993]. Mallerstang Dale, The Head of the Eden. Broadcast Books. ISBN 1-874092-21-4.
- Hanson, Neil (1990). Walking Through Eden. Pavilion Books. ISBN 1-85145-393-8.
- Wainwright, A (1980). An Eden Sketchbook. Westmorland Gazette.
