= Wild Boar Fell =

Mountain in Cumbria, England

Coordinates: 54.38411°N 2.37412°W

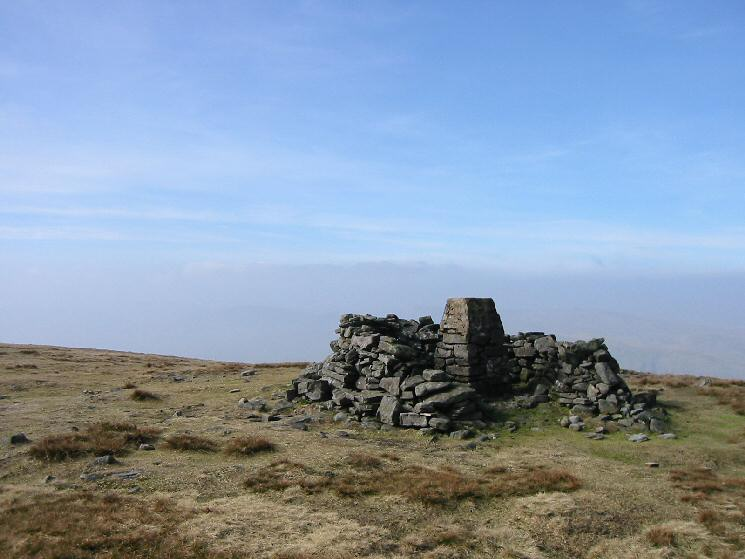
- The summit trig point

Highest point
- Elevation: 2,323 ft (708 m)
- Prominence: 1,129 ft (344 m)
- Parent peak: Cross Fell
- Listing: Marilyn, Hewitt, Nuttall

Geography
- Location: North Yorkshire/Cumbria, England
- Parent range: Pennines
- OS grid: SD757988
- Topo map: OS Landranger 98

Wild Boar Fell is a mountain in the Yorkshire Dales National Park, on the eastern edge of Cumbria, England. At 2,323 feet (708 m), it is either the fourth- or fifth-highest fell in the Yorkshire Dales, depending on whether nearby High Seat (2,326 ft (709 m)) is counted.

The nearest high point is Swarth Fell, a ridge about 1 mile (1.6 km) to the south. To the east, across the dale, are High Seat and Hugh Seat.

Wild Boar Fell sits on the boundary of the civil parishes of Mallerstang and Ravenstonedale.

== History ==
According to Wainwright, the fell gets its name from the wild boar that lived here over 500 years ago.

Millstone Grit from the fell was historically used to make millstones. Partly formed millstones remain on its eastern flank and nearby Mallerstang Edge. Locals also used sand from Sand Tarn to make sharpening blocks, or ‘strickles’.

A boar tusk claimed to be from “the last wild boar caught on the fell” is kept in Kirkby Stephen parish church.

During the Second World War, Wild Boar Fell was used by the British Army for tank crew training via Warcop Training Area.

== Geography ==
From the north, Wild Boar Fell appears as a peak, but its true flat-topped profile is seen from Aisgill. The summit, made of millstone grit, is reached via a bridleway from Hazelgill Farm.

The summit has a trig point; Sand Tarn lies about 330 yards (300 m) to the west. Views include the Howgill Fells, Lake District, Pennines, Yorkshire Three Peaks, and even Morecambe Bay on clear days.

Notable cairn groups (locally called "stone men") are found on The Nab, at the northwestern point of the summit plateau and on the subsidiary summit of Little Fell, some 1.2 mi (2 km) further north, which has a height of 1,834 ft (559 m) and a prominence of 92 ft (28 m), and is classed as a subdodd

== Gallery ==
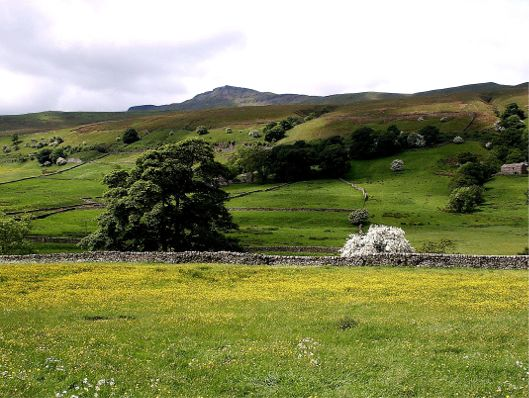
Wild Boar Fell, seen from Mallerstang in June, with wild flowers in the hay meadows

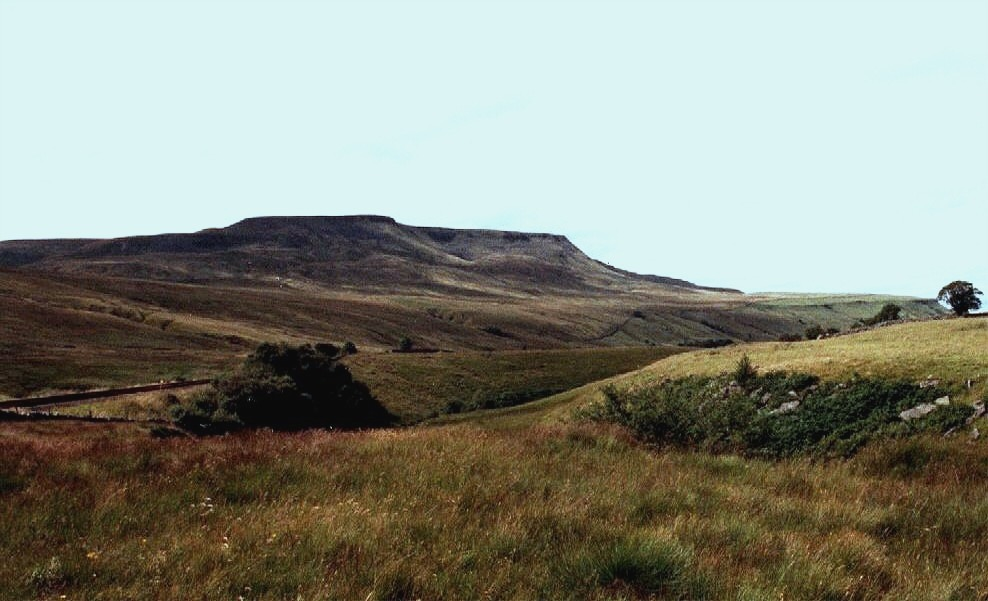
The table top profile of Wild Boar Fell, from Aisgill

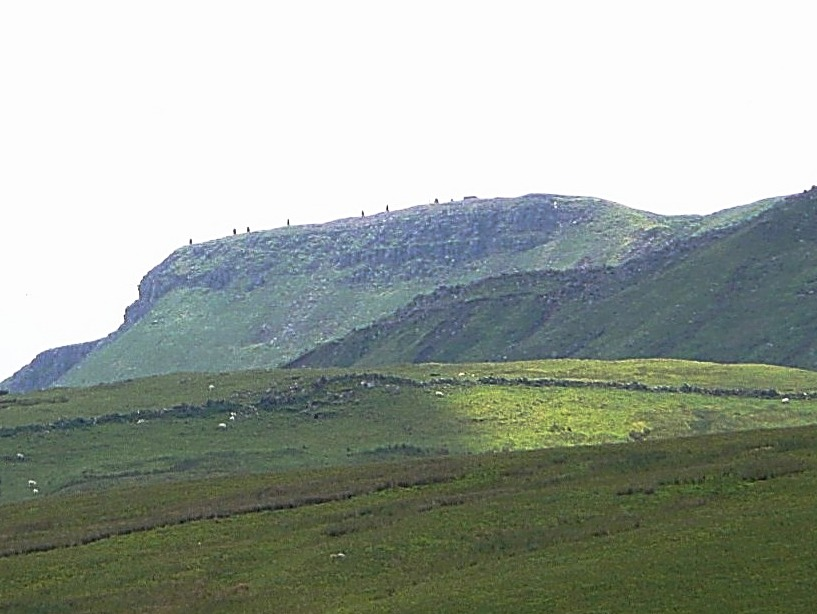
The Nab, Wild Boar Fell

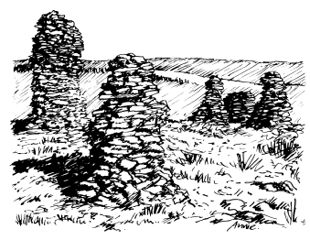
Cairns on The Nab, Wild Boar Fell
