= Hugh Seat =

- The summit, Lady's Pillar

Highest point
- Elevation: 689 m (2,260 ft)
- Prominence: 23 m
- Parent peak: Great Shunner Fell
- Listing: sub-Hewitt, Nuttall
- Coordinates: 54°23′14.7″N 2°17′53″W

Geography
- Location: Mallerstang, Cumbria, England
- Parent range: Pennines
- OS grid: SD8091599100
- Topo map: OS Landranger 98

Hugh Seat is a mountain, or more accurately a fell, in Mallerstang on the eastern edge of Cumbria, England. It lies on the border between Cumbria and North Yorkshire.

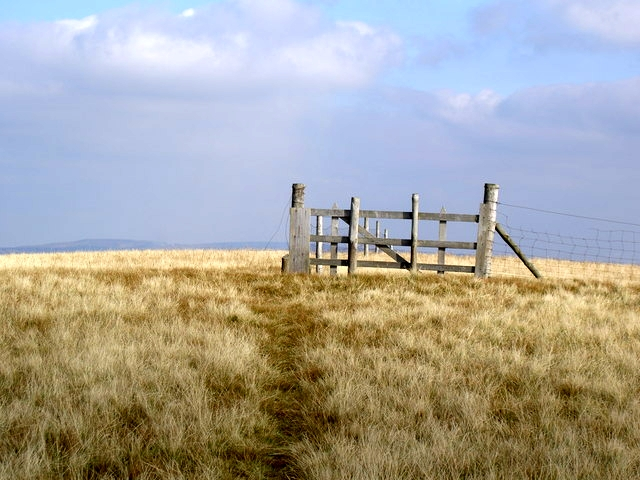
Boundary fence between Cumbria and North Yorkshire near the summit of Hugh Seat - photo by Ian Greig.

Hugh Seat is a high point above Black Fell Moss, an extensive area of peat bog drained by Red Gill Beck, which is the source of the River Eden. At this "watershed of England" two other great rivers, the Ure and the Swale, also rise within a kilometre of the Eden.

Although it has a relatively small prominence, having several other high points nearby (and is therefore classified as a "sub-Hewitt" or a Nuttall but not a Marilyn), Hugh Seat nevertheless rises conspicuously above the source of the River Eden.

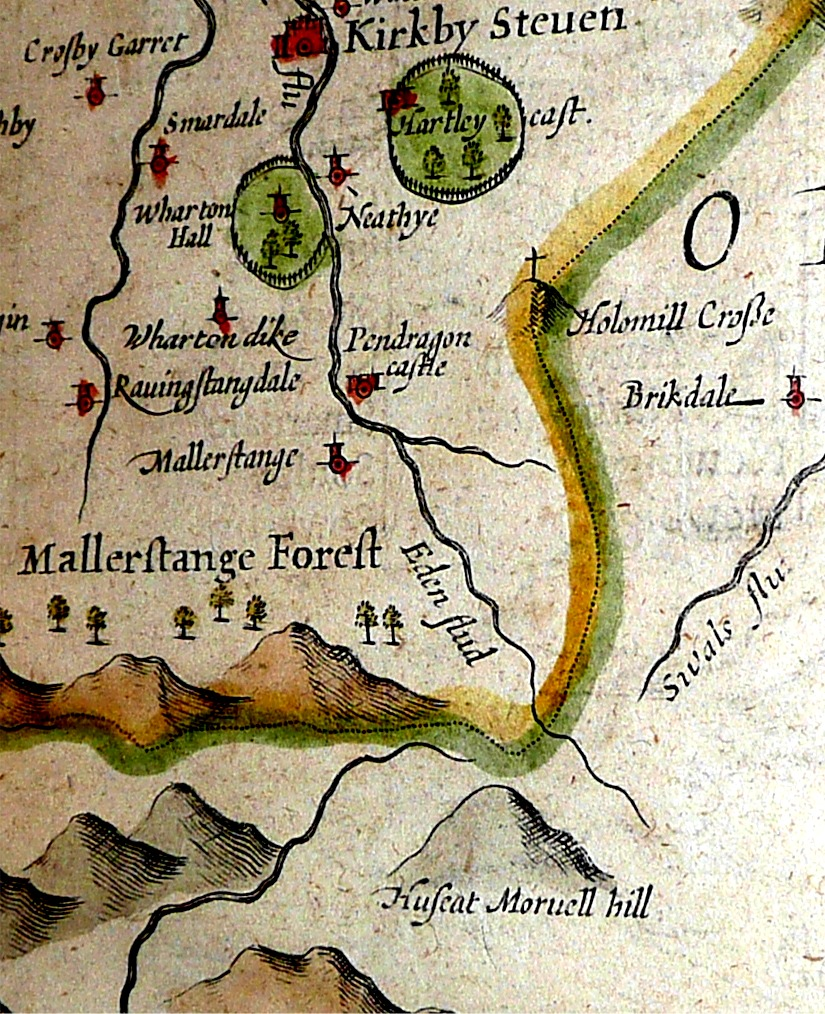
Mallerstang (showing "Huseat Morvel hill" to the south); from the 1610 map of Westmorland by John Speed

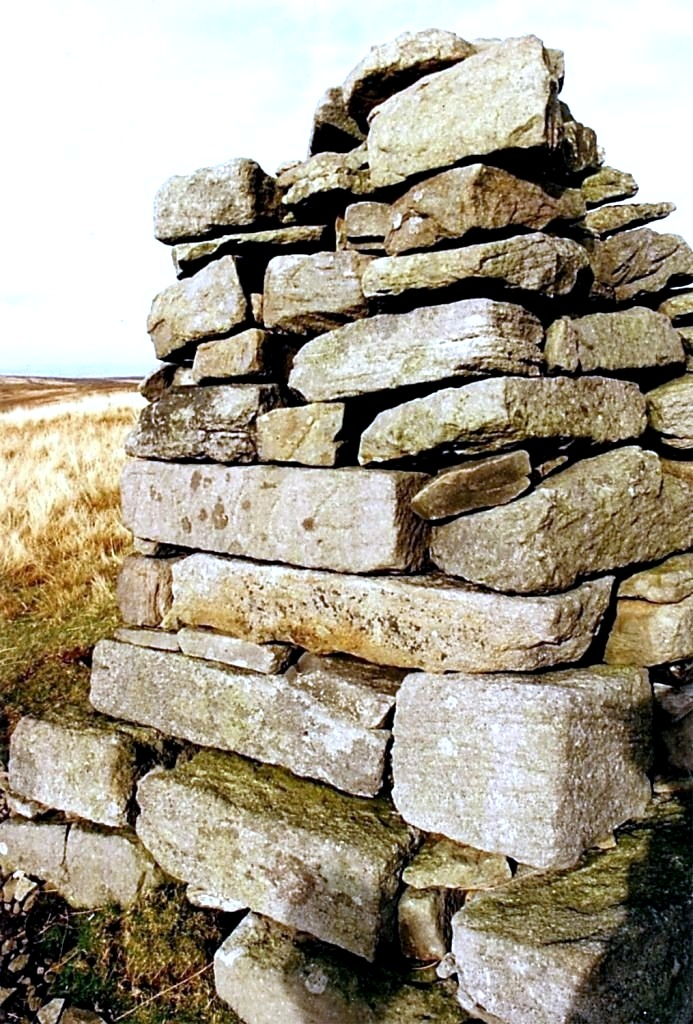
Lady Anne's Pillar (1664)

The old name for this peak was Hugh Seat Morvill or sometimes Morvil Hill, (and Daniel Defoe confuses it with Wild Boar Fell in his "Tour").

Near the summit there is a column of cut stones, known as "Lady's Pillar", and the inscription AP1664 can just be made out – for Anne Pembroke, Lady Anne Clifford's married name. The pillar was erected in 1664 to commemorate Sir Hugh de Morville, Lady Anne's predecessor as Lord of the Manor of Mallerstang. (Sir Hugh was one of the four knights responsible for the murder of Archbishop St.Thomas Becket in Canterbury Cathedral in 1170).

The border between the counties of Cumbria and North Yorkshire is marked near the summit by a fence, which is intended to stop sheep which are "heafed" (trained to stay in a certain area without the need for fences) straying beyond their allotted common land.

There are extensive views from the summit – south-east to Cotterdale and Wensleydale, north-west to Gregory Chapel, and west to Mallerstang and Wild Boar Fell. This rugged terrain between Great Shunner Fell and Wild Boar Fell, (part of what David Bellamy has called "the last wilderness in England"), is too inaccessible to be well known by tourists, but it is a favourite route for many walkers.
