= Ingleborough =

Mountain in the Yorkshire Dales, England

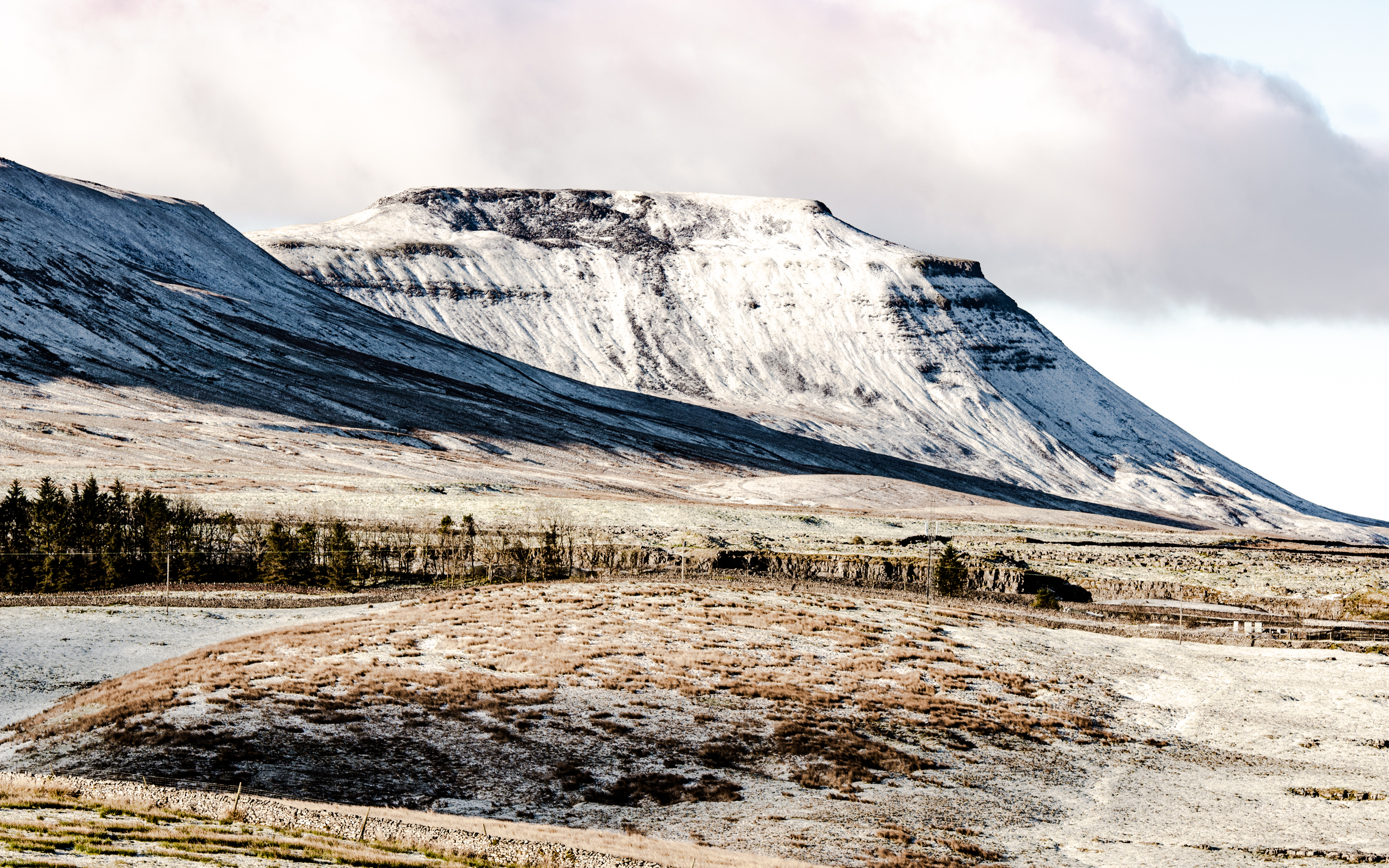
- Ingleborough, north face

Highest point
- Elevation: 723 m (2,372 ft)
- Prominence: c. 427 m
- Parent peak: Whernside
- Listing: Marilyn, Hewitt, Nuttall
- Coordinates: 54°09′59″N 2°23′52″W

Geography
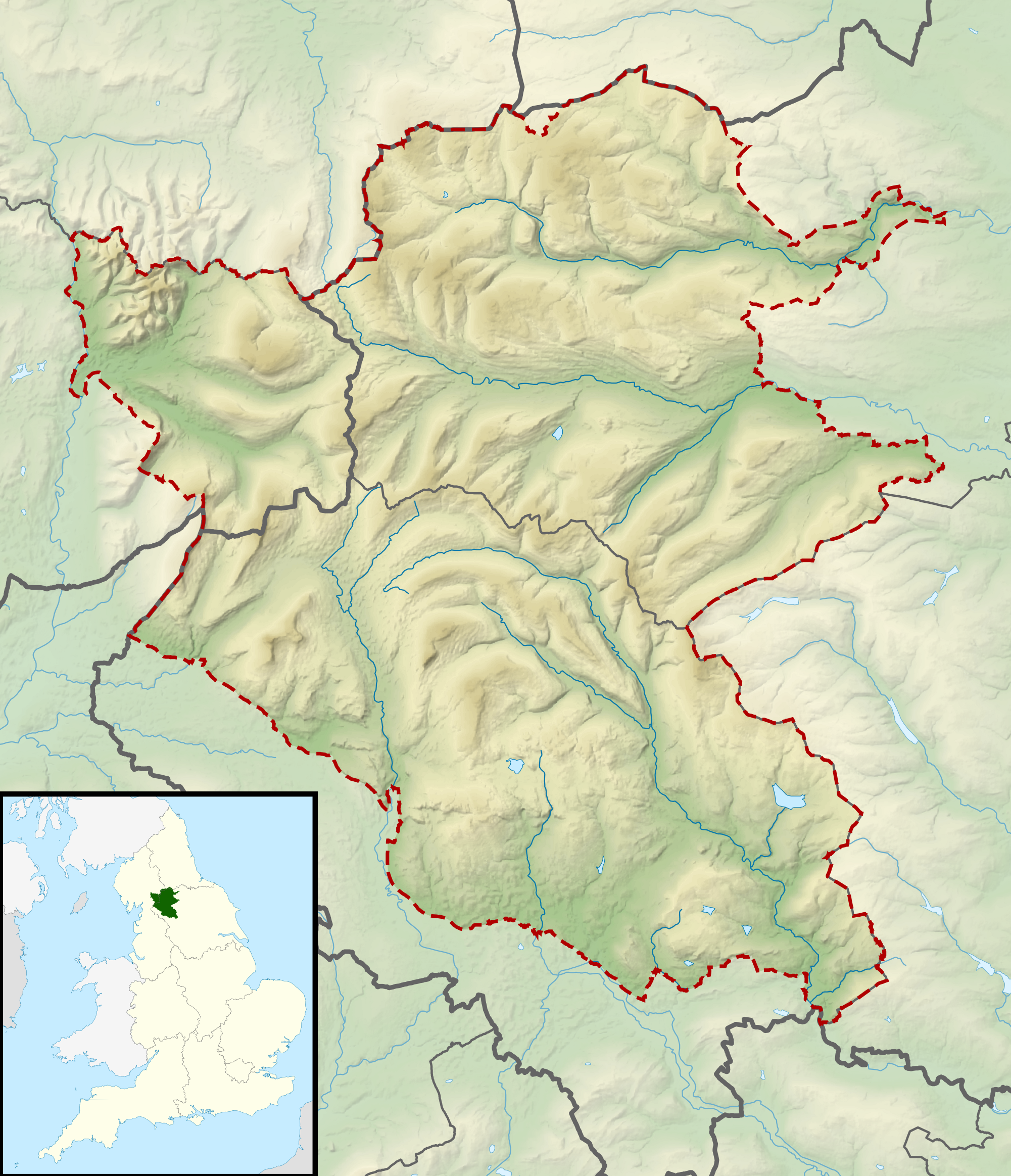
- Location within Yorkshire Dales
- Location: Yorkshire Dales, England
- OS grid: SD740745
- Topo map: OS Landranger 98

Ingleborough (723 m or 2,372 ft) is the second-highest mountain in the Yorkshire Dales, England. It is one of the Yorkshire Three Peaks (the other two being Whernside and Pen-y-ghent), and is frequently climbed as part of the Three Peaks walk. A large part of Ingleborough is designated as a Site of Special Scientific Interest and National Nature Reserve and is the home of a multi-agency project, Wild Ingleborough, with aims to improve the landscape for wildlife and people.

== Name ==
The first element of the name "Ingleborough" has been variably explained as a Scots term for 'beacon, fire', an Old Danish term meaning 'English' or a derivative of Old English ing, 'peak'. The second element is derived from the Old English word burh, meaning "a fortified place"; in this case, a hill fort.

== Geography ==
Ingleborough is in the south-western corner of the Yorkshire Dales, at the highest point of a triangle of land with corners at Ingleton, Ribblehead and Settle. The hill is connected to its nearest higher neighbour, Whernside, by a low col or mountain pass at Ribblehead at approximately 971 feet (296 m).

Ingleborough throws out a ridge to the north-east which develops into a summit, Simon Fell, and another summit further down, Park Fell. An ill-defined ridge going south-east from the summit breaks into two large areas of limestone plateau at about 1,300 feet (400 m); both plateaux contain summits and these are the subsidiary summits of Norber and Moughton. On the slopes of the former are the Norber erratic boulders. Continuing south-east the high land is broken by a divide carrying the minor road from Austwick to Helwith Bridge. On the other side of the divide the low summit of Smearsett Scar rises along with its subsidiaries, Pot Scar and Giggleswick Scar; from here the land falls away to the River Ribble at Settle.

On the western side of Ingleborough is a large limestone plateau appropriately known as White Scars. White Scar Caves run for 4 miles (6.5 km) below the plateau, and their entrance series has been developed as a show cave. The plateau is bounded by Raven Scar, the longest unbroken cliff in the district, and on top of it is the pothole of Meregill Hole. On the southern side (west of the Clapham path) is a similar plateau, containing potholes such as Fluted Hole and Pillar Hole.

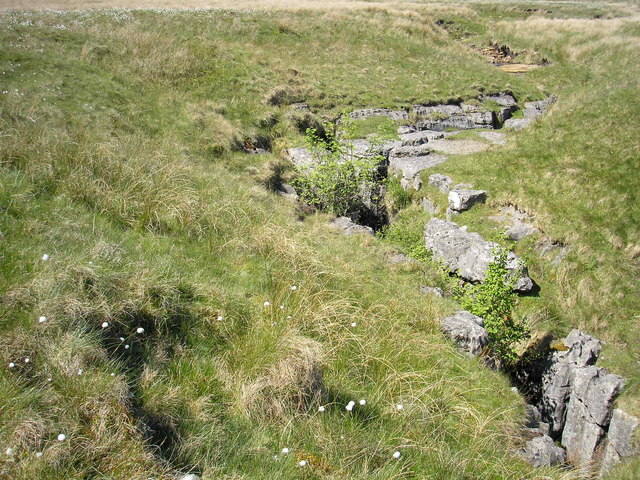
The unassuming but cavernous Juniper Gulf

The plateau to the north of Norber, an area known as The Allotment, is particularly rich in potholes; one of these, Long Kin East, can be followed without specialist caving equipment for 100 yards (91 m). Also here is Juniper Gulf, which descends 420 feet (130 m) underground through an arduous rift, dominated by a small geological fault.

The Smearsett Scar region contains the Celtic Wall, the Ebbing and Flowing Well (which has now stopped ebbing and flowing) and a glacial hollow known as the Happy Valley.

== Ascents ==
There are several popular hillwalking routes to its summit. A frequently used starting point is the village of Ingleton, about 4 miles (6 km) to the southwest. An ascent from here is about 7 1/2 miles (12 km) there and back. The route follows a walled lane, Fell Lane, before emerging onto a flat area, Crina Bottom, scattered with potholes including the considerable Quaking Pot. A steep climb through the limestone cliffs leads to the summit.

The hill may also be climbed from Horton in Ribblesdale 6 miles (10 km) crossing extensive areas of limestone pavement via Sulber Nick, an east/west aligned geological fault. Another route on this flank is from the isolated farmstead of Crummack.

The route from Clapham initially follows Clapham Beck, either by paying the entrance fee to the Ingleborough Estate nature trail, or along adjacent public rights of way, past the showcave of Ingleborough Cave. A short scramble up Trow Gill reaches open moorland and, shortly thereafter, the pothole of Gaping Gill. From here the path climbs the shoulder of Little Ingleborough before following the ridge to the summit. The return to Clapham can be varied by taking the Horton-in-Ribblesdale path for 2 miles (3 km) before striking south through more limestone pavement to the small top of Norber; a descent past the Norber erratics (Norber Boulders) finishes a walk of 11.5 miles (18.5 km) that Wainwright considered the finest walk in the Yorkshire Dales.

An alternative route from the south-west side of the triangle starts at Newby Cote, roughly a mile northwest of Clapham on the minor road heading towards Ingleton. This path proceeds ENE until it joins the main path from Clapham about a mile from the summit.

There is a northern route from the Hill Inn at Chapel-le-Dale, the route of ascent used by the Three Peaks Walk and the shortest way up the mountain, being just 3 miles (4.8 km) from village to summit. An interesting walk across a limestone plateau with many caves, including Great Douk Cave and Meregill Hole, is followed by a steep climb to the shoulder of the subsidiary summit of Simon Fell at 2,000 feet (610 m), a mile to the north-east of the summit. The passage from here to the summit is high-level and exhilarating, but requires some scrambling.

Finally there are unwaymarked routes heading NE across Simon Fell and Souther Scales Fell both of which reach a steep descent just beyond the triangulation pillar on Park Fell to reach the Right of Way at New Close. Both routes give commanding views of the area.

== The summit ==
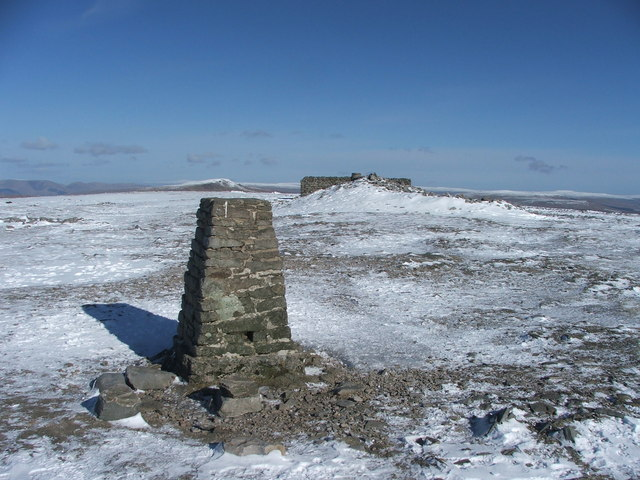
The trig point and windshelter

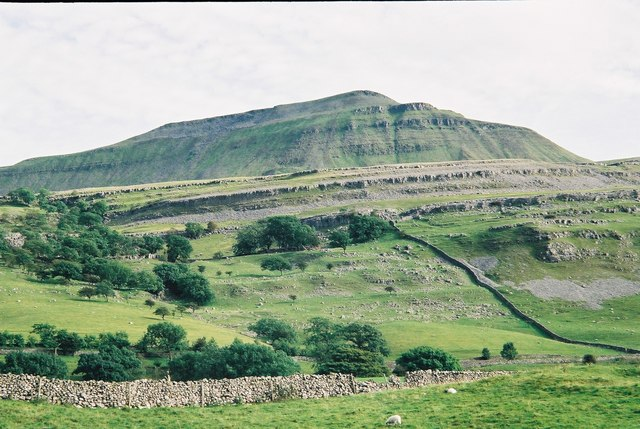
The layered appearance of Ingleborough

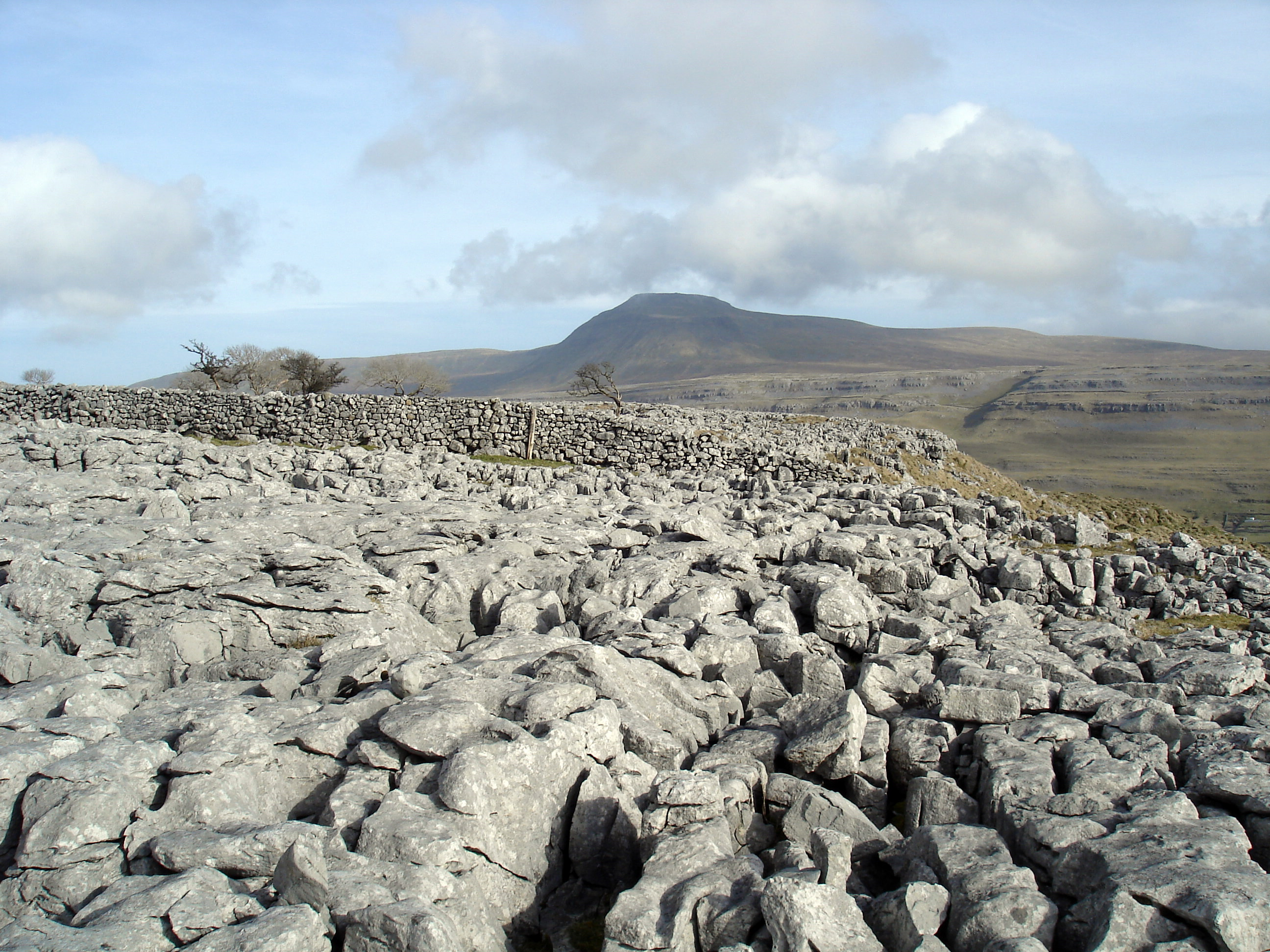
View from the limestone pavement Twistleton Scar, west of Ingleborough

The summit is a broad plateau half a mile in circumference, slightly convex, higher to the north-west than to the south-east, and carpeted with dry turf. There is an Ordnance Survey trig point (number S. 5619) at the highest point, near the western corner. Just to the north is a well built windshelter (cross-shaped to provide shelter whichever way the wind is blowing) with a view indicator or toposcope built into its centre. Between them is a large cairn. At the point where the Ingleton path reaches the summit rim are remains of a battlemented round tower, built in 1830.

The summit plateau is a Scheduled Monument classified as a 'large univallate hillfort' and a number of archaeological features are visible. These include the tumbled remains of a wall along its northern, eastern and southern edges and, scattered across the summit, some twenty ring-shaped stone mounds. The prevailing view is that these structures represent the ramparts and hut circles of an Iron Age hillfort though recent interpretations propose an earlier, possibly Bronze Age, origin and a ritualistic rather than domestic or defensive function.

== Geology ==
The distinctive appearance of Ingleborough, recognisable from all directions and from a great distance, is a result of its unique geology exposed by tectonic uplift and glacial erosion. It is bounded on its southwestern flanks by the degraded fault scarp of the Craven Fault System, the vertical displacement of which is some 1400 metres here. During periods of icesheet expansion the summit likely protruded above the ice forming a nunatak whilst glaciers carved the valeys that separate Ingleborough from its neighbours to the north and east, in doing so, revealing a succession of underlying rocks. The base of the mountain is composed of ancient Silurian and Ordovician 'Ingletonian Rocks', which can be seen in the valley bottoms to the north of Ingleton. Above this, and separated by an unconformity, lies a belt of Carboniferous Limestone, the 'Great Scar Limestone', some 600 feet (180 m) thick. Due to the limestone's permeability, all the streams flowing down from the mountain are engulfed upon reaching it, falling into a number of potholes. On top of this lies the layered Yoredale Series of sedimentary rocks, predominantly shale and sandstone, and generally concealed by the peat but revealed in the escarpments about 1,700 feet (520 m) up. There are also layers of harder limestone sandwiched between the softer rocks, which have been eroded faster, and which protect the layers beneath them, leading to the 'tiered' effect. The higher reaches of the mountain are protected from erosion by a cap of Millstone Grit approximately 100 feet (30 m) tall. The rock above the Millstone Grit layer has been eroded away, which explains the comparative flatness of the summit. A good explanation of the geology and scenery of the area is given in Waltham.

== The view ==
Marilyns visible from Ingleborough are listed here, clockwise from north, with their distance in miles and bearing in degrees.

1. Wild Boar Fell, 3.6°, 15.1m
2. Mickle Fell, 7.1°, 31.3m
3. Great Knoutberry Hill, 20.5°, 8.4m
4. Great Shunner Fell, 25.0°, 15.6m
5. Rogan's Seat, 31.7°, 20.9m
6. Dodd Fell Hill, 44.7°, 8.8m
7. Buckden Pike, 78.9°, 13.9m
8. Birks Fell, 84.0°, 11.1m
9. Great Whernside, 91.1°, 16.2m
10. Pen-y-ghent, 96.9°, 6.1m
11. Fountains Fell, 103.5°, 7.9m
12. Cracoe Fell, 121.7°, 18.5m
13. Rombald's Moor, 128.0°, 29.5m
14. Black Hill, 153.9°, 48.2m
15. Boulsworth Hill, 154.0°, 26.9m
16. Kinder Scout, 158.2°, 58.1m
17. Freeholds Top, 162.3°, 34.4m
18. Shining Tor, 165.6°, 64.7m
19. Pendle Hill, 168.8°, 21.0m
20. Easington Fell, 182.1°, 16.1m
21. Winter Hill, 187.5°, 37.4m
22. Billinge Hill, 196.1°, 47.4m
23. Hope Mountain, 200.4°, 78.3m
24. Cyrn y Brain, 202.7°, 84.9m
25. White Hill, 203.1°, 10.7m
26. Moel y Gamelin, 203.5°, 87.0m
27. Cadair Berwyn, 204.9°, 97.7m
28. Fair Snape Fell, 207.5°, 19.2m
29. Penycloddiau, 209.6°, 76.5m
30. Arenig Fawr, 213.3°, 102.7m
31. Carnedd y Filiast, 213.5°, 97.2m
32. Manod Mawr, 217.7°, 102.6m
33. Moel Siabod, 220.5°, 98.5m
34. Ward's Stone, 223.1°, 13.5m
35. Carnedd Llewelyn, 223.5°, 94.9m
36. Tal y Fan, 224.5°, 89.3m
37. Great Orme, 226.5°, 83.0m
38. South Barrule, 270.2°, 92.2m
39. Snaefell, 275.4°, 83.9m
40. Arnside Knott, 275.4°, 17.8m
41. Hutton Roof Crags, 278.6°, 11.6m
42. Black Combe, 279.9°, 38.3m
43. Kirkby Moor, 280.7°, 30.5m
44. Whitfell, 287.2°, 38.0m
45. Gummer's How, 291.3°, 23.4m
46. Top o' Selside, 291.5°, 28.9m
47. Whitbarrow, 292.3°, 20.1m
48. Old Man of Coniston, 296.0°, 32.5m
49. Holme Fell, 301.2°, 31.0m
50. Scafell Pike, 301.5°, 38.4m
51. Claife Heights, 302.0°, 26.4m
52. Great Gable, 303.7°, 39.7m
53. Lingmoor Fell, 304.0°, 33.0m
54. High Stile, 304.8°, 43.4m
55. High Raise, 306.9°, 35.9m
56. Loughrigg Fell, 307.4°, 31.0m
57. Dale Head, 307.8°, 41.0m
58. Grasmoor, 308.7°, 45.2m
59. Grisedale Pike, 311.1°, 45.0m
60. Fairfield, 313.8°, 33.2m
61. Red Screes, 314.4°, 30.2m
62. Helvellyn, 315.1°, 35.4m
63. St Sunday Crag, 315.9°, 33.4m
64. Stony Cove Pike, 317.3°, 29.8m
65. Skiddaw, 318.2°, 45.2m
66. High Street, 320.3°, 29.4m
67. Tarn Crag, 322.4°, 26.0m
68. Calf Top, 324.9°, 8.3m
69. Great Coum, 335.4°, 6.1m
70. The Calf, 341.8°, 14.7m
71. Yarlside, 346.6°, 15.3m
72. Aye Gill Pike, 351.3°, 8.8m
73. Cross Fell, 354.5°, 37.3m
74. Whernside, 357.9°, 4.3m
75. Baugh Fell, 359.5°, 10.6m

== Gallery ==
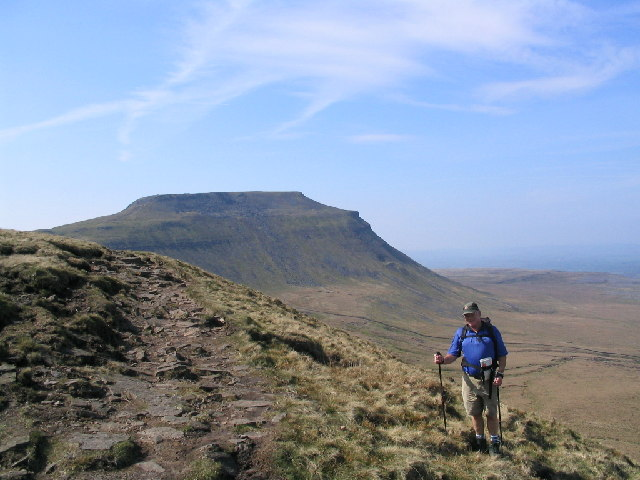
Ingleborough seen on the ascent of Simon Fell

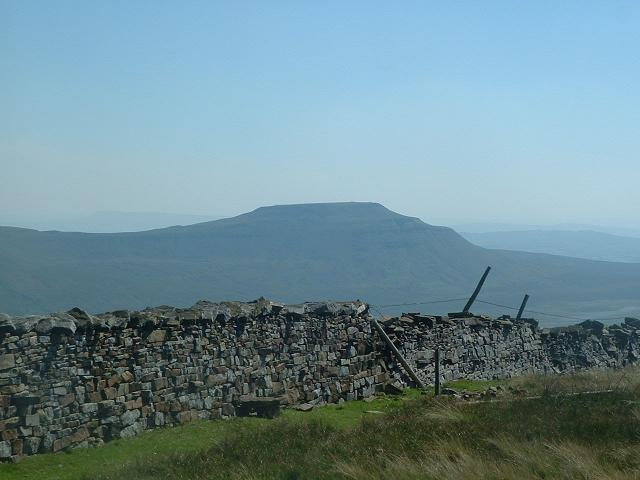
Ingleborough as seen from the summit of Whernside

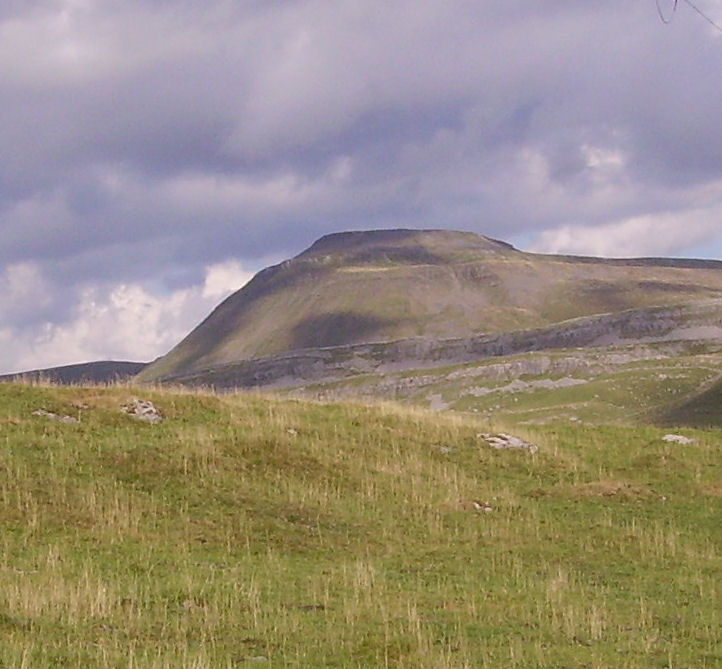
Ingleborough ascent

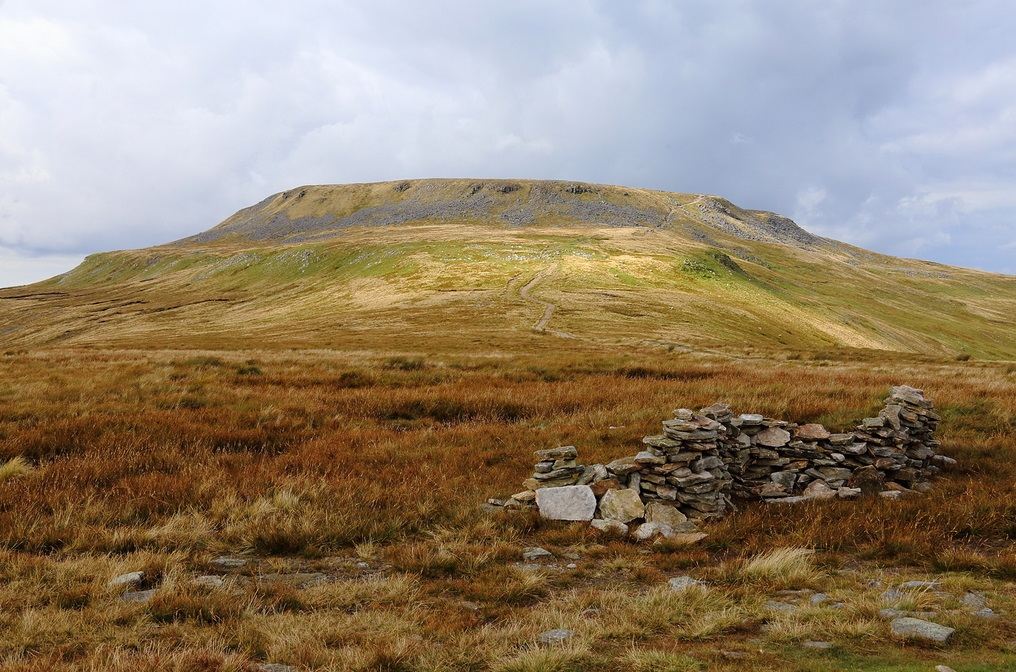
Ingleborough from Little Ingleborough

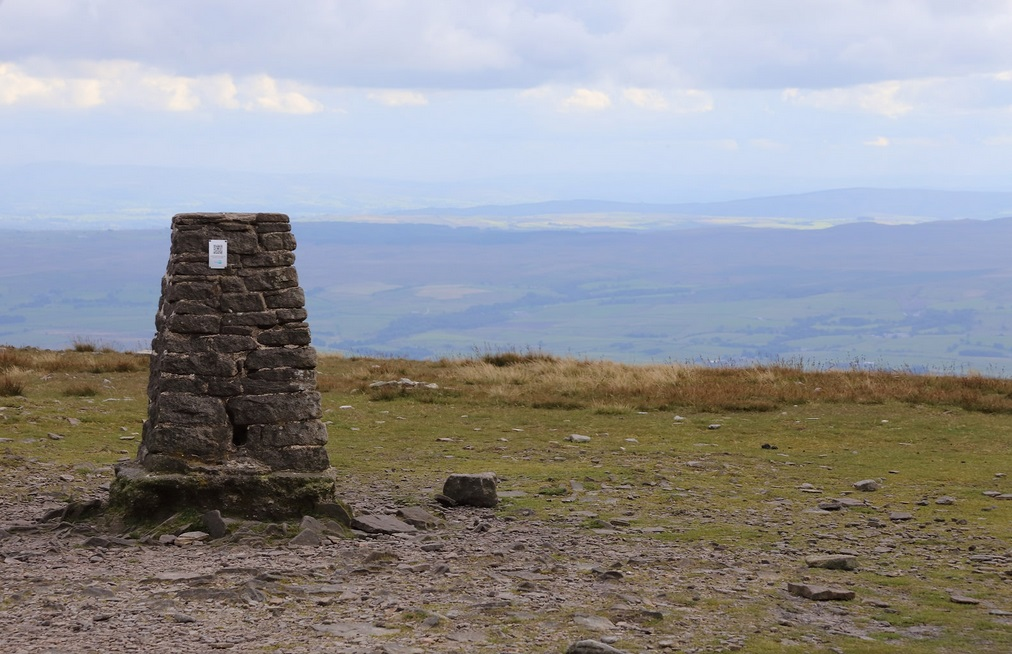
Ingleborough Summit trig point
