= Forest of Bowland =

Upland conservation area in Lancashire, England

Coordinates: 53.95°N 2.59°W

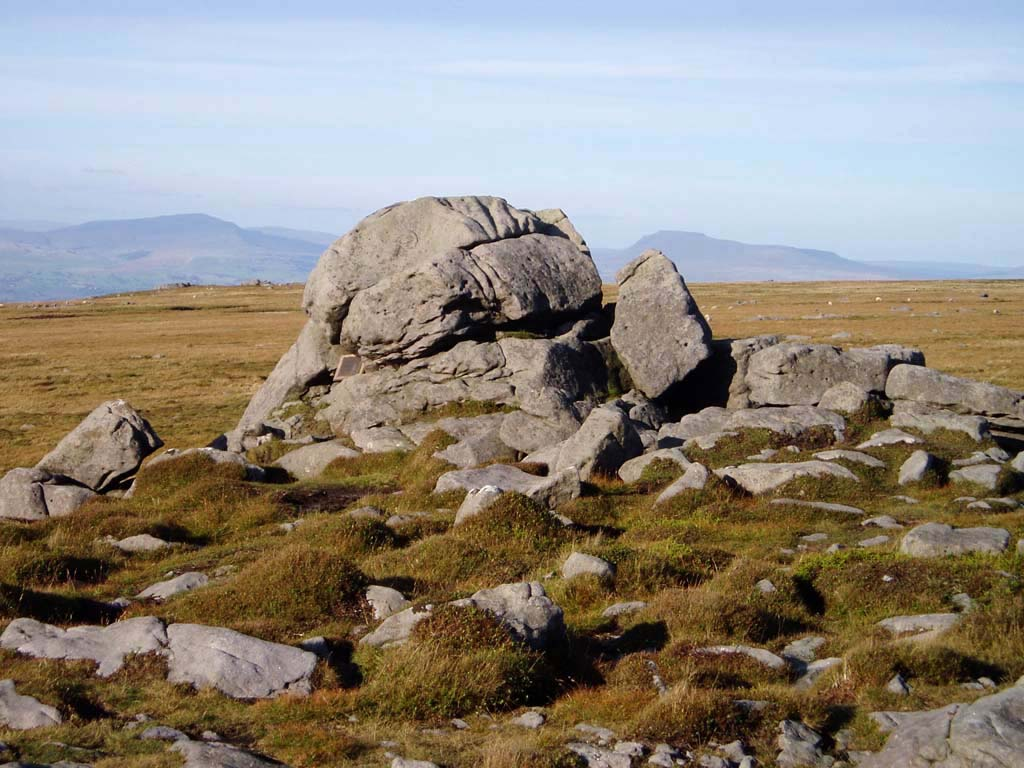
- Ward's Stone is the highest point in the Forest of Bowland at 1,841 feet (561 m).

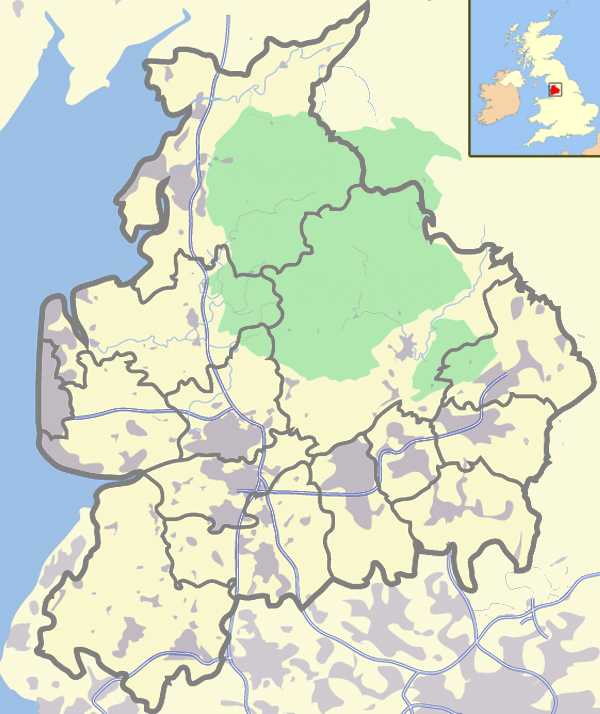
- The Forest of Bowland AONB shown (in green) with the district boundaries of Lancashire
- Location: England
- Established: 1964; 62 years ago

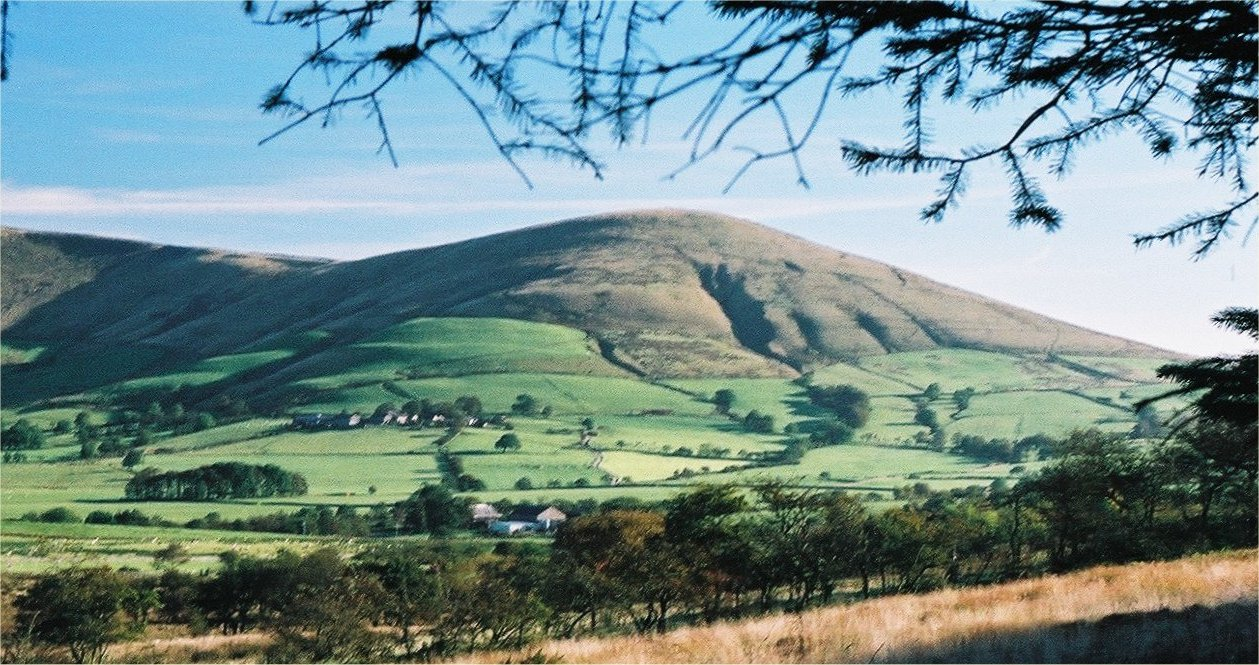
Parlick

The Forest of Bowland, also known as the Bowland Fells and formerly the Chase of Bowland, is an area of gritstone fells, deep valleys and peat moorland, mostly in north-east Lancashire, England, with a small part in North Yorkshire (however, roughly half of the area falls into the area of the historic West Riding of Yorkshire). It is a western outlier of the Pennines.

The Forest of Bowland was designated an Area of Outstanding Natural Beauty (AONB) in 1964. The AONB also includes a detached part known as the Forest of Pendle separated from the main part by the Ribble Valley, and anciently a royal forest with its own separate history. One of the best-known features of the area is Pendle Hill, which lies in Pendle Forest. There are more than 500 listed buildings and 18 scheduled monuments within the AONB.

The Trough of Bowland is a pass connecting the valley of the Marshaw Wyre with that of Langden Brook, and dividing the upland core of Bowland into two main blocks.

The hills on the western side of the Forest of Bowland attract walkers from Lancaster and the surrounding area. Overlooking Lancaster is Clougha Pike, the westernmost hill. The hills form a large horseshoe shape with its open end facing west. Clockwise from Lancaster the hills are Clougha Pike (413 m or 1,355 ft), Grit Fell (468 m or 1,535 ft), Ward's Stone (561 m or 1,841 ft), Wolfhole Crag (527 m or 1,729 ft), White Hill (544 m or 1,785 ft), Whins Brow (476 m or 1,562 ft), Totridge (496 m or 1,627 ft), Parlick (432 m or 1,417 ft), Fair Snape Fell (510 m or 1,670 ft), Bleasdale Moor (429 m or 1,407 ft), and Hawthornthwaite Fell (478 m or 1,568 ft).

The area contains, by one definition, the geographic centre of Great Britain which is close to the Whitendale Hanging Stones, around four miles (6 km) north of Dunsop Bridge. The historical extent of Bowland Forest is divided into two large administrative townships, Great Bowland (Bowland Forest High and Bowland Forest Low) and Little Bowland (Bowland-with-Leagram), but the modern-day AONB covers a much larger area.

== History ==
Possibly a region of the British kingdom of Rheged, Bowland was absorbed into Northumbria in the 7th century. In turn, as Northumbrian influence waned, the westernmost areas of Bowland became part of Amounderness, a territory forged by the Norse hold Agmundr, a vassal of Eowils, Halfdan and Ingwaer, co-kings of Jorvik, in the early 10th century.

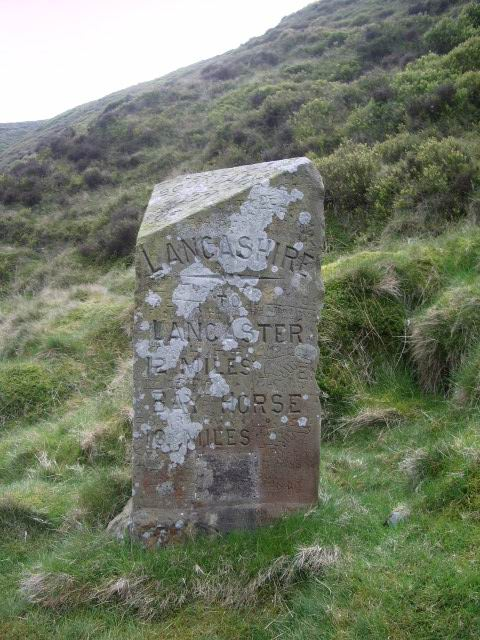
The Lancashire side of the Grey Stone of Trough

In 926, Amounderness was annexed by Æthelstan, king of the West Saxons, as a spoil of war. In 934, he granted it to Archbishop Wulfstan I of York. According to Aethelstan's grant, Amounderness at that time stretched "from the sea along the Cocker to the source of that river, from that source straight to another spring which is called in Old English, "Dunshop", thus down the rivulet to the Hodder, in the same direction to the Ribble and thus along that river through the middle of the channel to the sea". As such, Amounderness encompassed a significant portion of western and south-western Bowland.

Ekwall thus describes the eastern boundary of Amounderness as "being formed by the fells on the Yorkshire border"; a description which places the ancient boundary firmly within the modern-day Forest of Bowland. While it is difficult to pinpoint Dunshop, the confluence of the rivers Dunsop and Hodder at Dunsop Bridge seems a likely locale, situated as it is close to the eastern mouth of the Trough of Bowland, whose Grey Stone marks the line of the pre-1974 county boundary.

Contrary to the popular histories, the origins of the name "Bowland" have nothing to do with archery ("the land of the bow") or with mediaeval cattle farms or vaccaries (Old Norse, buu-, farmstead). The name derives from the Old Norse boga-/bogi-, meaning a "bend in a river". It is a 10th-century coinage used to describe the topography of the Hodder basin, with its characteristic meandering river and brooks.

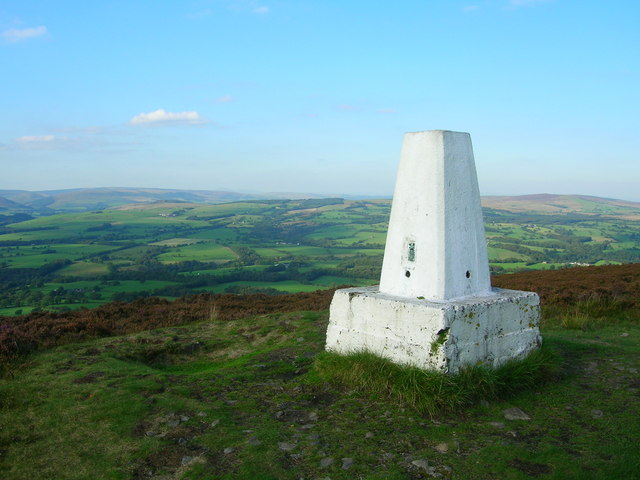
A trig point on Longridge Fell

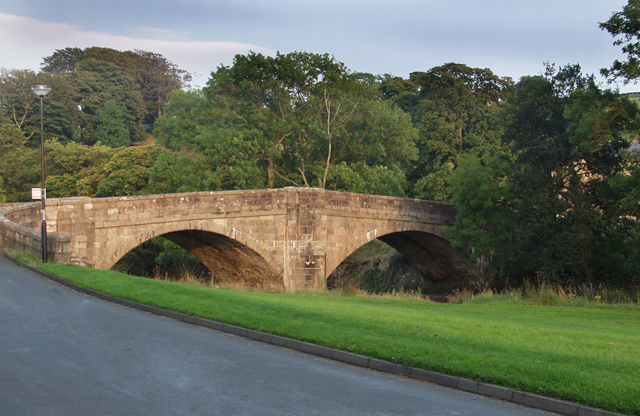
Slaidburn Bridge, Slaidburn

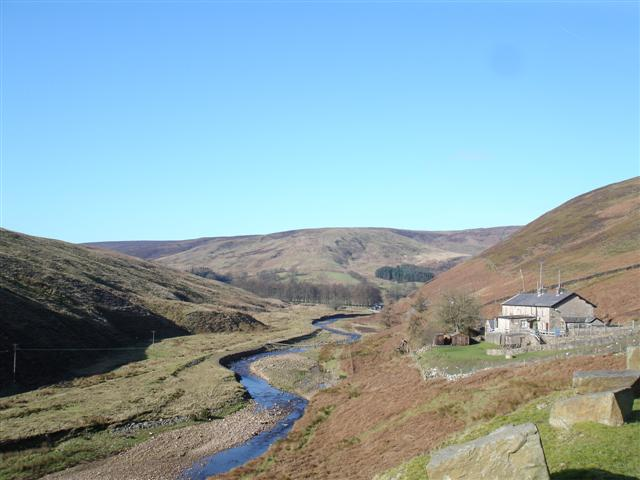
Smelt Mill cottages, Bowland Pennine Mountain Rescue Team HQ

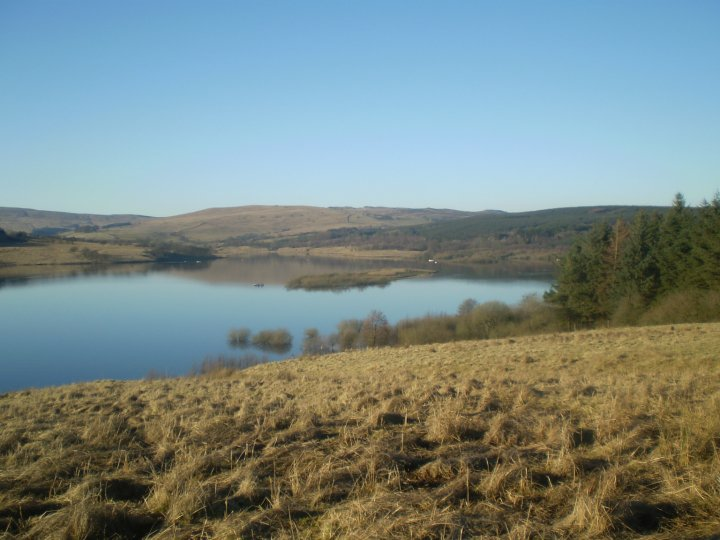
Stocks Reservoir, Forest of Bowland

The Domesday Bogeuurde is an instance of this usage – the placename thought to designate Barge Ford (formerly known as Boward), a ford that sits on the wide, pronounced bend of the Hodder at its confluence with Foulscales Brook, due south-west of Newton.

Before the Norman Conquest, Bowland was held by Tostig, son of Godwin, Earl of Wessex. However, as feudal entities, the Forest and Liberty of Bowland were created by William Rufus sometime after Domesday and granted to his vassal Roger de Poitou, possibly to reward Poitou for his role in defeating the Scots army of Malcolm III in 1091–92. In all likelihood, it was this grant that subsumed the eastern portion of Amounderness into the Lordship of Bowland for the first time.

By the end of the 11th century, the Forest and Liberty came into the possession of the De Lacys, Lords of Pontefract. In 1102, along with the grant of the adjacent fee of Clitheroe and further holdings in Hornby and Amounderness, they came to form the basis of what became known as the Honour of Clitheroe.

In 1311, the Honour of Clitheroe was subsumed into the Earldom of Lancaster. Between 1351 and 1661, it was administered as part of the Duchy of Lancaster. By the late 14th century, Bowland comprised a Royal Forest and a Liberty of ten manors spanning eight townships and four parishes and covered an area of almost 300 square miles (800 km^{2}) on the historic borders of Lancashire and Yorkshire. The manors within the Liberty were Slaidburn (Newton-in-Bowland, West Bradford, Grindleton) Knowlmere, Waddington, Easington, Bashall Eaves, Mitton, Withgill (Crook), Leagram, Hammerton and Dunnow (Battersby). Pendle Forest was also part of the Honour of Clitheroe, but administered as part of the Forest of Blackburnshire, entirely in Lancashire.

Gradale, in the northeastern extremity of the forest, grew in population as new land was made available for colonisation. In the mediaeval period, it was a pasture of the Cistercian grange of Rushton on the upper Hodder. In 1537, its manor house, Kirkstall Abbey, was dissolved. Tenements began appearing in the area from the mid-16th century.

By 1650, the lower land of the forest had been almost completely cleared of woods, then divided into small plots, with only the higher land remaining open. Whereas their forebears of the 16th century lived in "crude timber and thatch cottages", the farmers of the following century were likely inhabiting stone farmhouses.

In October 1652, Parliament had made a survey of the area, when it was an estate of the Duchy of Lancaster formerly belonging to Charles I. The survey showed that the forest was not just a demesne hunting ground, and that, since the 13th century, it had started to become a place of habitation by commoners, including tenant farmers, who had purchased their holdings from James I or Charles I. As farming increased, so did the populousness of the forest. Parks were created for the preservation of the remaining deer. It was one of many such surveys of Crown lands made by the government during the interregnum. The common result of these surveys was that the land was sold off, but the Chase of Bowland (as it was then known) remained under the ownership of the Duchy for a further decade.

In 1661, the 28 manors contained within the former Honour of Clitheroe, including the Forest and Liberty of Bowland, were granted by the Crown to General George Monck as part of the creation of the Dukedom of Albemarle. Monck had been a key figure in the restoration of Charles II. The Lordship of Bowland then descended through the Montagu, Buccleuch and Towneley families.

Bowbearers of the Forest of Bowland have been appointed since the 12th century. A Bowbearer was originally a noble who acted as ceremonial attendant to the Lord of Bowland, latterly the king, by bearing (carrying) his hunting bow, but over the centuries the Bowbearer's role underwent many changes. In April 2010, it was reported that the current 16th Lord of Bowland had revived the office of Bowbearer and appointed Robert Redmayne Parker the first Bowbearer of the Forest in almost 150 years.

The Forest of Bowland had its own forest courts – woodmote and swainmote – from early times. These appear to have been abandoned in the 1830s around the time of Peregrine Towneley's acquisition of the Bowland Forest Estate. The halmote court at Slaidburn was disbanded following the abolition of a copyhold by the Law of Property Act in 1922. General forest law in Britain was finally repealed by statute in 1971, more than 900 years after its introduction by the Normans. The original Bowland Forest courts appear to have been held at Hall Hill near Radholme Laund before moving to Whitewell sometime in the 14th century.

The Industrial Revolution had little impact on Bowland, as it had no coal reserves or valleys with fast flowing streams to power wool and cotton industries. There was some small-scale lead mining and lime production, quarrying and paper and cotton mills.

St Hubert, the patron saint of hunting, is also the patron saint of the Forest of Bowland and has a chapel dedicated to him in Dunsop Bridge. This chapel was founded by Richard Eastwood of Thorneyholme, land agent to the Towneley family. Eastwood was the last known Bowbearer of the Forest of Bowland. An acclaimed breeder of racehorses and shorthorn cattle, he died in 1871 and is buried at St Hubert's.

Considerable areas of the Bowland Fells were used for military training during the Second World War, and there are still unexploded bombs in some areas.

== Ecology ==
The name "forest" is used in its traditional sense of "a royal hunting ground", and rather than being covered by trees, much of the land is heather moorland and blanket bog. In the past wild boar, deer, wolves, wildcats and game roamed the forest. The last herd of wild deer is reported to have been destroyed in 1805.

In recent decades extensive peatland restoration work has been carried out in the AONB , with over 755 hectares of blanket bog being restored since 2010 through the co-operation of estates including Abbeystead estate, which is owned by Grosvenor estates, Whitewell estate, which is owned by the Duchy of Lancaster, United Utility's Bowland estate and organisations such as Natural England, Lancashire Wildlife Trusts, Yorkshire Peat Partnership, Wyre Rivers Trust and Ribble Rivers Trust, amongst others. This ongoing work has helped to undo decades of damage caused to the ecology and landscape of the area by bad land management practices.

=== Grouse shooting ===
Large parts of moorland are still managed for grouse shooting. The Abbeystead estate holds the record for the largest number of grouse killed in one day, when on 12 August 1915, 2,929 birds were shot by just eight hunters.

=== Protected areas ===
38,940.5 acres (15,759 ha) of the Bowland Fells is designated a Site of Special Scientific Interest (SSSI). The area is internationally important for its upland bird populations and under the Habitats Directive "Bowland Fells" has been designated a Special Protection Area (designated especially for breeding merlin and hen harrier). Part of the land designated as Bowland Fells SSSI is owned by United Utilities.

=== Hen harriers ===
The hen harrier is the current symbol of the AONB, although originally this position was occupied by the goshawk, the 'queen of the Forest', a hawk that in medieval times was only permitted to be flown by nobility and therefore became emblematic of royal hunting forests such as Bowland. Because the hen harrier is under threat from illegal persecution in the Forest of Bowland and other upland areas of England, with none recorded breeding in England in 2013, this emblem was unofficially modified and adapted to represent the hen harrier instead.

The RSPB takes the view that driven grouse shoots should be licensed so that, for example, crimes committed on estates managed for shooting should result in the withdrawal of their right to operate.

Bowland Beth: The Life of an English Hen Harrier, a 2017 book by film director David Cobham, studies the persecution of the hen harrier on the grouse moors of the Forest of Bowland.

==== Partial recovery of the species ====
In 2014 it was announced that the Forest of Bowland would be one of the SPAs included in a European Union LIFE project designed to ensure a sustainable future for Hen harriers in England and Scotland. Called "Conserving the hen harrier (Circus cyaneus) in northern England and southern and eastern Scotland", the project aimed to work constructively with landowners and the shooting community. In 2015 a single chick fledged in the Forest. In 2018 two nests were reported on land belonging to United Utilities. In 2020–22 the work of staff from Natural England and gamekeepers from the area's estates, monitored by the RSPB, showed further progress, with 22 hen harriers fledging in 2020, 31 in 2021 and at least 39 in 2022.

== Geography ==
Hills of the Forest of Bowland AONB
Places in the Forest of Bowland AONB

Bowland is dominated by a central upland landform (generally above 1,200 feet (370 m) and rising to 1,700 feet (520 m)) of deeply incised gritstone fells covered with tracts of heather-covered peat moorland and blanket bog. The lower slopes of the fells are dotted with stone-built farms and small villages and are criss-crossed by drystone walls enclosing reclaimed moorland pasture. Steep-sided wooded valleys link the upland and lowland landscapes. In the north-east of the area are extensive coniferous plantations and the eastern limestone areas support high-quality species-rich meadows. Caves in the area include Hell Hole, Whitewell Cave and Whitewell Pot. It is surrounded by the Yorkshire Dales and South Pennines, from which the fells are separated by the Aire Gap and Ribble Valley.

The southern part of the Forest of Bowland is divided by the valley of the River Hodder. West of the river lies a tract of lowland dotted by limestone hills, such as the New Laund and Long Knott. East of the Hodder is a low-lying area known as the Lees. Nearby, higher up, are Browsholme Moor and Burholme Moor.

== Geology ==
The Forest of Bowland is formed largely from the succession of sandstones, mudstones and siltstones dating from the late Carboniferous period which constitute the Millstone Grit Group. Early Carboniferous rocks in the form of the limestones and associated rocks of the Craven and Bowland High groups underlie the area at depth and are exposed at the surface around its south-eastern margin. The succession in stratigraphic order (uppermost/youngest at top) is this:

- Millstone Grit Group
  - Silsden Formation
    - Ward's Stone Sandstone (member)
    - Roeburndale Member (including the Dure Clough Sandstone)
  - Pendleton Formation
    - Brennand Grit (member) (corresponds to the Warley Wise Grit or Grassington Grit elsewhere)
    - Pendle Grit Member
- Craven Group
  - Bowland Shale Formation (mudstone and siltstone)
  - Pendleside Limestone Formation (interbedded limestone and mudstone, conglomerate)
  - Hodderense Limestone Formation
  - Hodder Mudstone Formation (limestone and mudstone)
- Bowland High Group
  - Chatburn Limestone Formation (formerly a 'group')

The Ward's Stone Sandstone forms the peaks and hillsides of Clougha Pike, Ward's Stone, Tarnbrook Fell, Wolfhole Crag and Mallowdale Fell whilst the Dure Clough Sandstone forms White Hill, Great Harlow and Lythe Fell. The Brennand Grit forms Bowland Knotts, Great and Little Bull Stones, Whitendale Hanging Stones and parts of Brennand Fell. The Pendle Grit forms almost all of the fells south-west of the Trough of Bowland and all of the south-east of the Forest from Winfold Fell to Croasdale Fell as far east as Gisburn Forest. It also forms Birkett, Waddington, Easington and Grindleton fells, south of Slaidburn.

== Museum and visitor centre ==
The Bowland Visitor Centre is located in Beacon Fell Country Park in the AONB. It is managed by Lancashire County Council Countryside Service and provides visitors with information about the AONB and surrounding countryside.

There is a display on the ecology of the Forest of Bowland in Clitheroe Castle Museum.

== Amenities ==
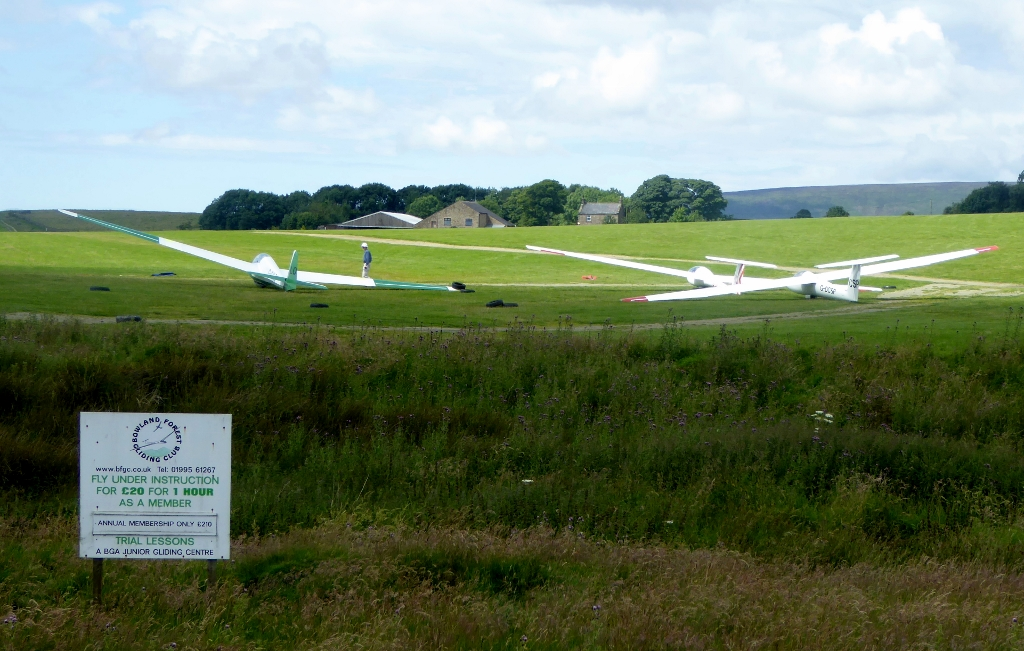
Bowland Forest Gliding Club, looking north-west

One mile to the west of Chipping is Bowland Forest Gliding Club, ICAO airport code GB-0339, which is used by winch-launched gliders.

== Events ==
The Bowland Challenge was a fundraising event held from 2006 to 2009, and again in 2011, in which teams of walkers navigated around a series of grid references over a ten-hour period. It raised funds for the Bowland Pennine Mountain Rescue Team. Crafty Vintage Festive Markets take place every year in December within Wyresdale Park near to the village of Scorton. Nicky Nook Fell hosts a road stage with spectator viewing zones along the route of the North West Stages car rally.

Popular annual events held in the area's many villages and communities include Chipping Steam Fair, the Hodder Valley Show, Slaidburn Steam and Vintage Vehicle display, and Wray Scarecrow Festival, amongst others.

== In culture ==
- There is a Forest of Bowland Suite by Lakeland composer Christopher Gibbs (born 1938).
- The Forest of Bowland by Helen Shaw is a photographic celebration of the landscape, its settlements, people and stunning scenery (Hardback, Merlin Unwin Books, 2025)
- W. G. Rigby's children's tale The Ring of Tima (1998) is set in the Forest of Bowland.
- The Dark Legend Dossier by James Churchill is set in the town of Worton, located in the fictional 'Mender Vale.' The precise location of the town is never given but it is described as being 'north of Clitheroe' and some 7½ miles east of the M6 motorway.
- Jane Routh's 2014 collection of poetry Falling into Place is set in the Forest of Bowland.
- Denys Watkins-Pitchford's 1955 steampunk fantasy Forest of Boland Light Railway is set in the aforementioned forest.
- Wyresdale Park featured on Drew Pritchard's Salvage Hunters in 2017.
- In September 2011, Wyresdale Park featured on Channel 4's Country House Rescue, in the first episode of Series 3.

== Principal summits ==
The following summits within the National Landscape have more than 30 metres topographic prominence:

1. Ward's Stone (562.4m)
2. Pendle Hill (557m)
3. White Hill (544.9m)
4. Wolfhole Crag (527m)
5. Fair Snape Fell (521.9m)
6. Totridge (496m)
7. Hailshowers Fell (486m)
8. Hawthornthwaite Fell Top (479m)
9. Whins Brow (476m)
10. Baxton Fell (469m)
11. Grit Fell (468m)
12. Parlick (432m)
13. Bowland Knotts (430.7m)
14. Top of Blaze Moss (424m)
15. Burn Moor (402m)
16. Easington Fell (396.3m)
17. Waddington Fell (395.7m)
18. Middle Knoll (395m)
19. Wheathead Height (389m)
20. Holden Moor (371m)
21. Caton Moor (361m)
22. Longridge Fell (349.9m)
23. Mellor Knoll (344m)
24. Stang Top Moor (327m)
25. Marl Hill Moor (310.6m)
26. Beacon Hill (305m)
27. Ling Hill (290m)
28. Rigg of England (284.8m)
29. Kitcham Hill (283m)
30. Beacon Fell (267m)
31. Black Hill (265m)
32. Long Knots (256m)
33. Mossthwaite Fell (244m)
34. Boarsden Moor (243m)
35. Barnacre Moor (218.9m)
36. Nicky Nook (214.9m)
37. The Cragg (214m)
38. Holme Wood Hill (190m)
39. Fober Knoll (172m)
40. Sullom Hill (167m)
41. Oaken Head (163m)
42. Knots Wood (156m)

The following summits are over 300 metres in altitude but outside the National Landscape:

1. Weets Hill (396.6m)

== See also ==
- Listed buildings in Aighton, Bailey & Chaigley, Barley-with-Wheatley Booth, Bashall Eaves, Blacko, Bolton-by-Bowland, Bowland-with-Leagram, Bowland Forest High, Bowland Forest Low, Caton-with-Littledale, Chipping, Claughton, Downham, Dutton, Easington, Goldshaw Booth, Gisburn Forest, Goosnargh, Great Mitton, Grindleton, Hornby-with-Farleton, Mearley, Nether Wyresdale, Newton, Old Laund Booth, Over Wyresdale, Paythorne, Pendleton, Quernmore, Roeburndale, Roughlee Booth, Sabden, Sawley, Slaidburn, Tatham, Thornley-with-Wheatley, Twiston, Waddington, West Bradford, Wiswell, Wray-with-Botton
- Bill Smith, fell runner
