= Hawthornthwaite Fell =

Mountain in the United Kingdom

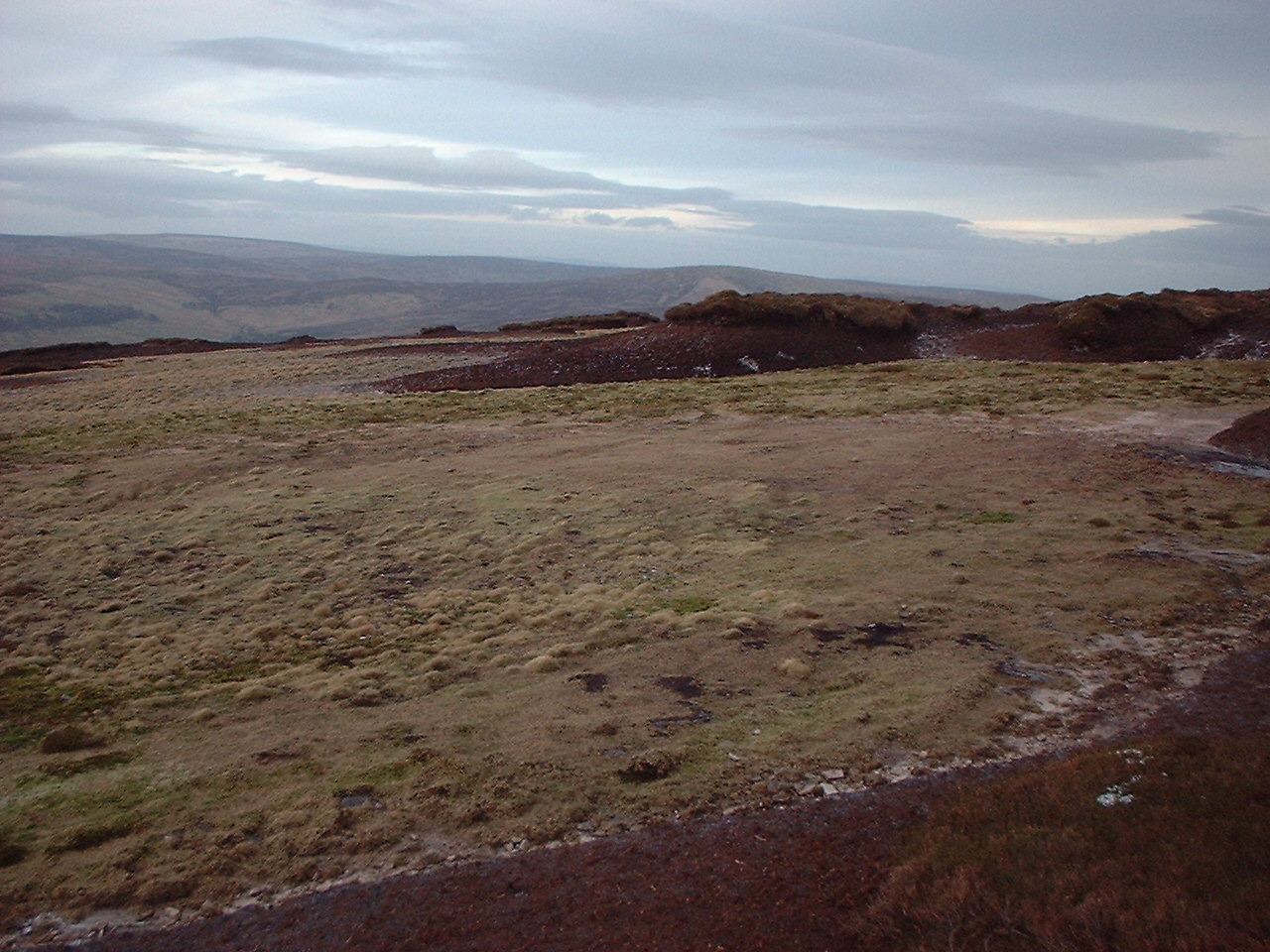
- Hawthornthwaite Fell with White Hill and Whin Fell in the distance

Highest point
- Elevation: 479 m (1,572 ft)
- Prominence: c. 57 m
- Coordinates: 53°57′25″N 2°38′41″W

Geography
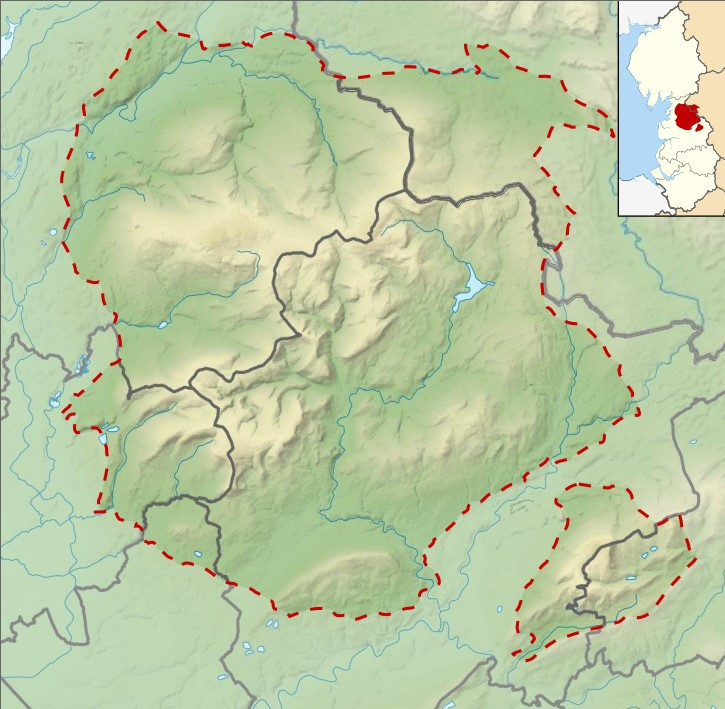
- Location within the Forest of Bowland Location within Lancashire Location within the City of Lancaster district Location within the Borough of Ribble Valley
- Location: Forest of Bowland, England
- OS grid: SD578514
- Topo map: OS Landranger 102

Hawthornthwaite Fell is one of the larger hills in the Forest of Bowland in the north west of England. Hawthornthwaite Fell marks the extreme western limit of the West Riding of the historic county of York. Since 1974 it has fallen within the boundaries of the administrative county of Lancashire. However, most of the hill is on the Duke of Westminster's land. It occupies a north-facing position on the south-western range, close to Bleasdale and Fair Snape Fell. The only path to the summit comes over the hills from the south. The summit is boggy and flanked to the north by steep heather slopes. Grouse are farmed in the area and hen harriers can be seen frequently. The trig point and the remains of its foundations are no longer upright, lying horizontally pointing westward.

== See also ==
- Langden Brook, sourced from the fell
