= Wolfhole Crag =

Mountain in northwest England

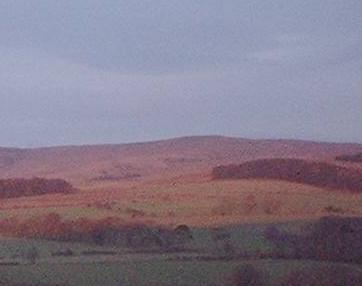
- Wolfhole Crag in the distance as seen from Hawthornthwaite fell

Highest point
- Elevation: 527 m (1,729 ft)
- Prominence: 38 m (125 ft)
- Coordinates: 54°01′00″N 2°33′58″W

Geography
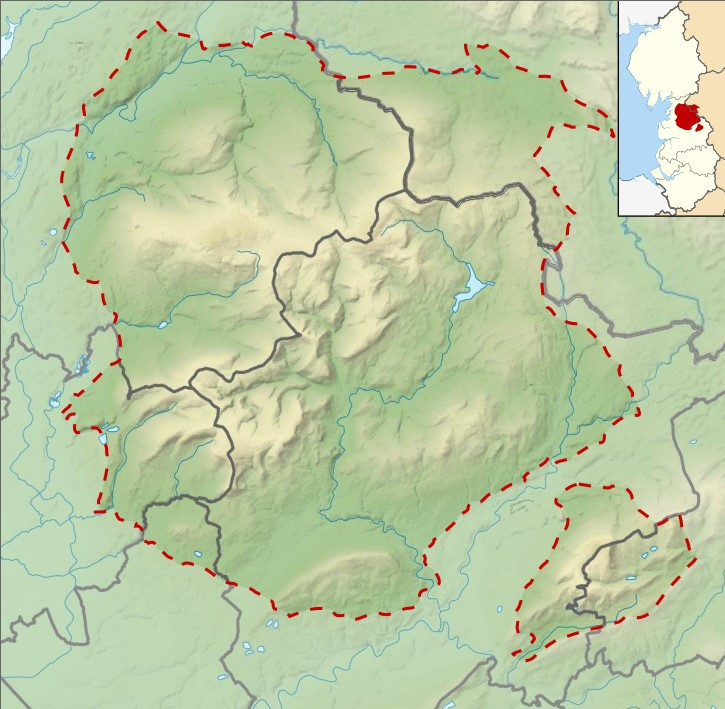
- Location within the Forest of Bowland Location within Lancashire Location within the City of Lancaster district Location within the Borough of Ribble Valley
- Location: Forest of Bowland, England
- OS grid: SD630580
- Topo map: OS Landrangers 102, 103

Wolfhole Crag is an isolated and rarely visited hill in the Forest of Bowland in Lancashire, England. It has an elevation of 527 m (1,729 ft) and a prominence of 38 m (125 ft). Its seclusion is due in part to its low profile and long approach walks. The eastern crag has a 'Wolf hole' at the base of the south-facing side, presumably how it gained the name. Wolfhole Crag marks the northwesternmost boundary of the civil parish of Bowland Forest High, the historic Forest of Bowland, and the Lordship of Bowland.

A long path approaches from Ward's Stone in the west which is fraught with bogs. Another tarmac path from Tarnbrook meets this halfway. A final path comes from the northeast from the Hornby Road in the direction to White Hill. The summit consists of two large (10m high) buttresses of gritstone, some oddly shaped waist-high rocks, and the usual trig point. The buttresses contain a number of recorded rock climbs, including the two furthest "hard grit" routes (E7 & E6) from the road in the entire UK. Both climbs were ascended in 2001 by Neil Kershaw and Greg Chapman.

The "Wolf Hole" that gives the hill its name
