= Ward's Stone =

Highest hill in the Forest of Bowland, England

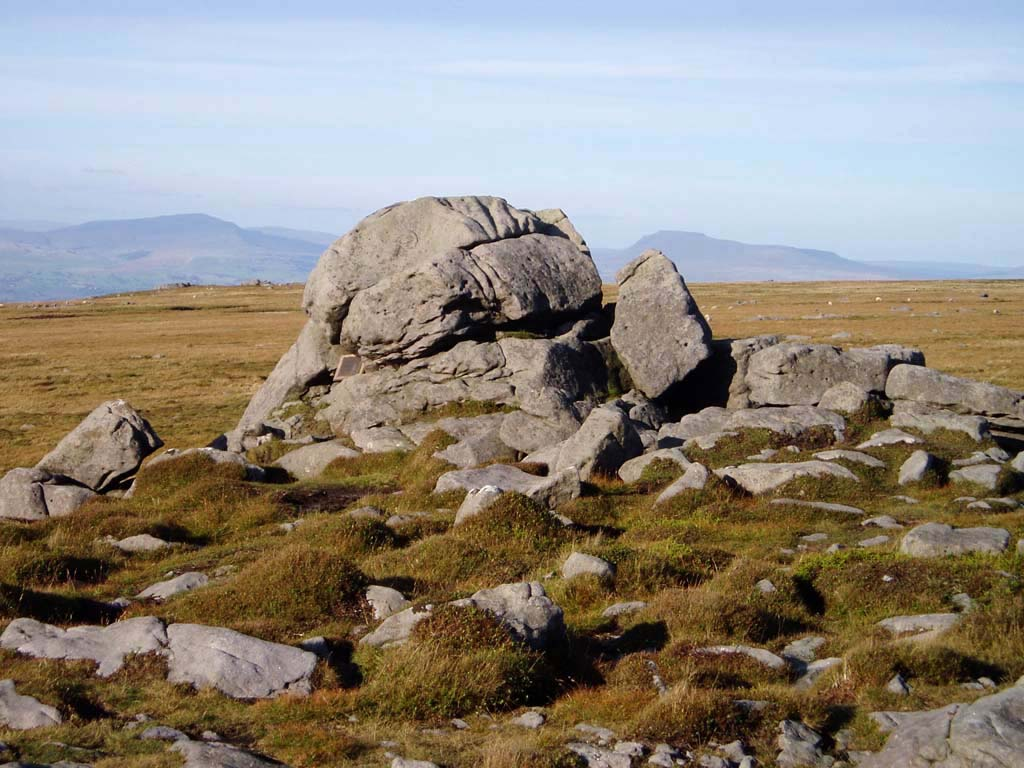
- The summit rocks of Ward's Stone, with Ingleborough behind on the right

Highest point
- Elevation: 1,841 ft (561 m)
- Prominence: 1,296 ft (395 m)
- Parent peak: Ingleborough
- Listing: Marilyn, Hardy
- Coordinates: 54°01′22″N 2°37′27″W

Geography
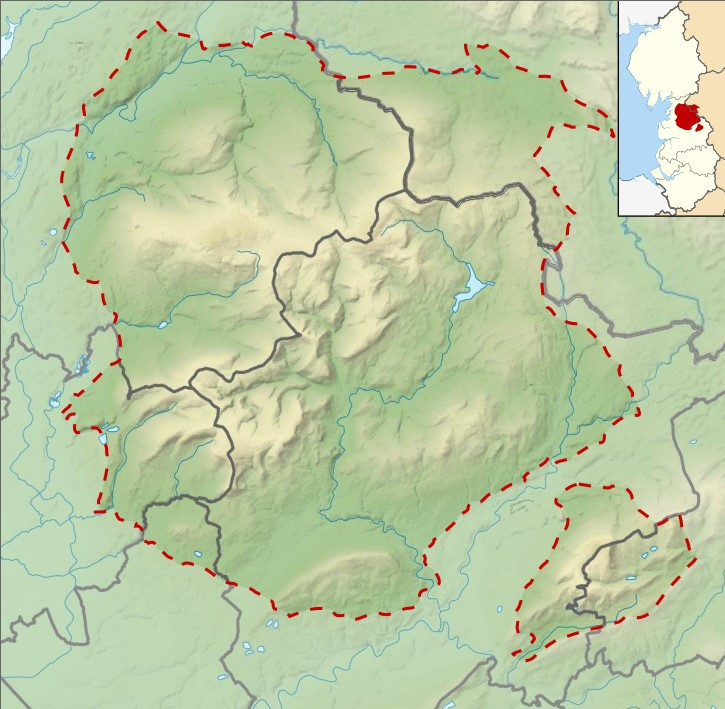
- Location within the Forest of Bowland Location within Lancashire Location within the City of Lancaster district
- Location: Lancashire, England
- OS grid: SD592587
- Topo map: OS Landranger 102

Ward's Stone is the highest hill in the Forest of Bowland, England. Its flat top hides two trig points nearly a kilometre apart. The western trig point sits atop of large rocks, including one, the Ward's Stone, that is so large it attracts boulderers and climbers.

The path from Grit Fell is difficult: crossing Cabin Flat, it weaves its way across hidden pools of stagnant water, the presence of which is betrayed by a form of red grass. White markers supposedly point out the way, but more often result in leading the walker astray. The second trig points faces the empty vastness of the eastern Forest of Bowland, with the summits of Wolfhole Crag, White Hill and the distant Ingleborough breaking the horizon. A second path approaches Ward's Stone from Tarnbrook, where limited parking is available.

On the southern slope of this hill are Thorn Crag, Hell Crag and Long Crag, rocky outcroppings that are popular with climbers. Within Thorn Crag, a shallow cave system exists that leads to Hell Crag; this route was first traversed by Lancaster University Mountaineering Club.

== Panorama ==
The following principal summits form the horizon in perfect viewing conditions (distances in miles):

- N-NE: Grayrigg Forest (26), Melmerby Fell (49), Cross Fell (47), Fell Head (25), Great Dun Fell (46), The Calf (24), Calf Top (17), Mickle Fell (43), Great Coum (17), Gragareth (14), High Seat (30), Whernside (17), Great Knoutberry Hill (22), Rogan's Seat (34), Lovely Seat (29), Ingleborough (14)
- NE-E: Yockenthwaite Moor (24), Plover Hill (19), Penyghent (18), Buckden Pike (26), Fountains Fell (19), Great Whernside (27), Grizedales (18), White Hill (5)
- E-SE: Skipton Moor (27), Rombald's Moor (34), Pinhaw Beacon (23), Boulsworth Hill (26), Pendle Hill (17)
- SE-S: Black Hill (45), Bleaklow Head (50), Kinder Scout (54), Hail Storm Hill (29), Shining Tor (59), Bull Hill (27), Winter Hill (28), Fair Snape Fell (7)
- S-SW: Raw Head (65), Ashurst's Beacon (32), Moel y Golfa (93), Hope Mountain (66), Cyrn y Brain (72), Moel y Gamelin (74), Cadair Berwyn (85), Moel Famau (66), Aran Fawddwy (96), Arenig Fawr (90), Arenig Fach (87), Manod Mawr (89), Moelwyn Mawr (92), Moel Siabod (85), Snowdon (89), Carnedd Llewelyn (81)
- W-NW: South Barrule (84), Snaefell (76), Black Combe (33), Whitfell (34), Caw (32)
- NW-N: Old Man of Coniston (31), Scafell Pike (38), Bowfell (37), Glaramara (39), Crag Hill (46), High Raise (Langdale) (37), Ullscarf (38), Skiddaw (48), Helvellyn (38), Red Screes (33), Stony Cove Pike (34), High Street (34), Branstree (33)
