= Simon Fell =

Simon Fell may refer to:

- Simon H. Fell (1959–2020), English bassist and composer
- Simon Fell (politician), Conservative Party politician, former MP for Barrow and Furness
- Simon Fell (Yorkshire Dales), a subsidiary summit of Ingleborough, a mountain in the Yorkshire Dales in Northern England
