= Clougha Pike =

Hill near Lancaster, England

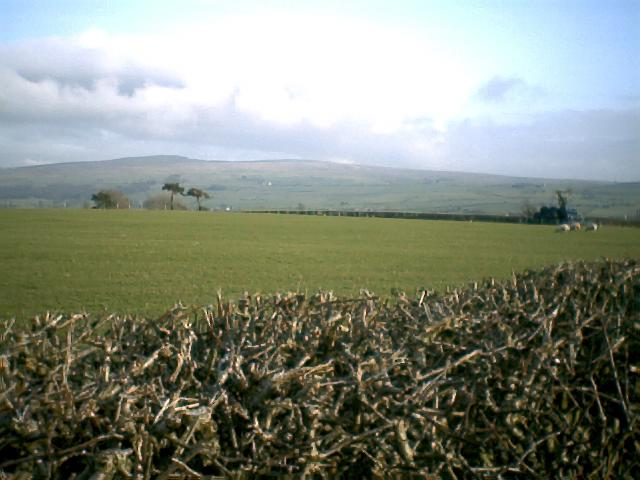
- Clougha Pike from near Lancaster University

Highest point
- Elevation: 413 m (1,355 ft)
- Prominence: c. 3 m
- Coordinates: 54°01′44″N 2°41′53″W

Naming
- Pronunciation: /ˈklʌfə/

Geography
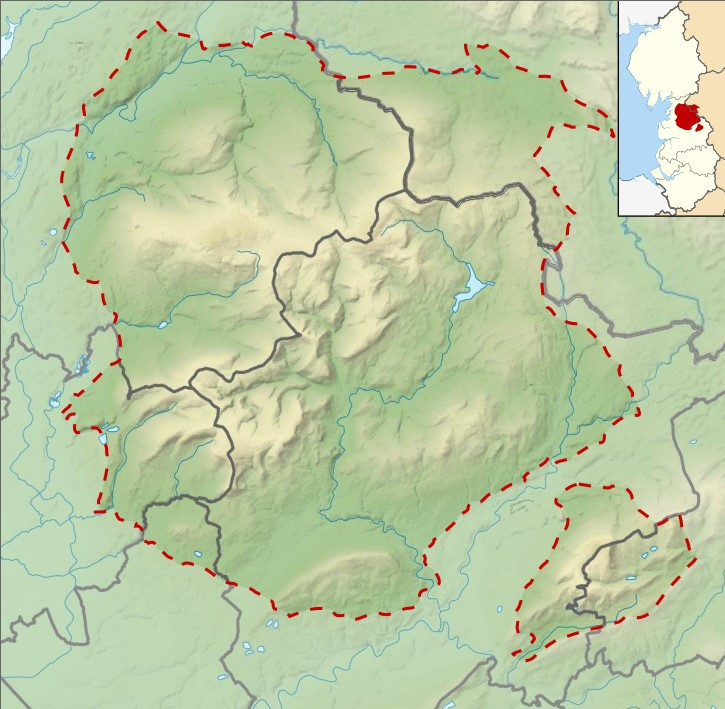
- Location within the Forest of Bowland Location within Lancashire Location within the City of Lancaster district
- Location: Forest of Bowland, England
- OS grid: SD544595
- Topo map: OS Landranger 102

Clougha Pike (/ˈklʊfə/ KLUUF-ə) is a hill in the Forest of Bowland in Lancashire, England. From the west it looms over the Conder Valley, the city of Lancaster and Lancaster University. It is visible from as far away as Barrow-in-Furness, South Lakeland mountains such as the Old Man of Coniston, and Blackpool Tower. From the west, it appears to be a large dome shape, with a cliff-like section at the very top. From the south-west, a series of notches or cloughs are visible in its flanks, giving the hill its distinctive name. The notches vary in size and run across the side of the hillside, but not down it. The largest notch has had part of its floor filled in by a small lake and swamp and is a dramatic gritstone boulder-strewn feature. These notches are thought to have been cut by meltwater flowing south-west from the area of Littledale, along the side of a glacier which occupied the Quernmore valley. They are known as marginal notch channels and are among the best examples of these features in Britain.

Clougha can be reached from the west, by a pleasant path that travels up its slopes by Rowton (spelt variously) Brook and then diagonally up the final steep broken rock section. It can also be reached from the east from Grit Fell, over boggy land along a muddy path that is sometimes difficult to distinguish. An approach from the north, from the direction of Caton, is also possible. A small car park is also available close to Clougha Pike, just off Rigg Lane. Another starting point to ascend Clougha is from the Victorian folly of Jubilee Tower, where there is also a car park.

Its summit furniture includes an Ordnance Survey trig point and two rock wind shelters. The view west from the top is over Morecambe Bay. On a clear day views from Clougha Pike extend to Snowdonia, the Ribble Estuary, the Isle of Man (directly behind Barrow-in-Furness), the fells of the Lake District and many of the Pennine hills. Very rarely, the Mourne Mountains can be seen to the south of the Isle of Man.

Clougha Pike was one of the lowest of the 100 hills included in Trail magazine's 2007 list of "Britain's Greatest Mountains".
