= Listed buildings in Bleasdale =

Bleasdale is a civil parish in the Wyre district of Lancashire, England. It contains six listed buildings that are recorded in the National Heritage List for England. All the listed buildings are designated at Grade II, the lowest of the three grades, which is applied to "buildings of national importance and special interest". The parish is entirely rural, and apart from a church, all the listed buildings are farmhouses.

== Buildings ==
Name and location	Photograph	Date	Notes
Higher Fairsnape Farmhouse; 53.90834°N 2.63633°W	—	1637	The farmhouse is in sandstone, pebbledashed at the front, with a slate roof. There are two storeys with an attic, and on the front is a porch under a catslide roof, with one bay on each side of it. The doorway has a rendered chamfered surround, and above it is a carved coat of arms, including initials and the date. The windows are mullioned. Inside the house are two bressumers.
Middle Fairsnape Farmhouse; 53.90814°N 2.63638°W	—	17th century	The farmhouse is in stone with a roof partly of slate and partly of stone-slate, and has two storeys. There were originally two bays, and another bay was added later to the right. The windows are mullioned, and the doorway has plain reveals.
Brooks Farmhouse; 53.90714°N 2.66195°W	—	Late 17th century	A sandstone farmhouse with a roof partly of slate and partly of stone-slate, it has two storeys with an attic. There is a single-storey lean-to against the left part of the northeast face. The windows, some of which are blocked, are mullioned, and there is a single-light blocked fire window.
Little Blindhurst Farmhouse; 53.89655°N 2.63005°W	—	1731	The farmhouse is in stone with a slate roof, in two storeys and three bays. Some of the windows are mullioned and transomed with architraves, and others are cross windows. The porch has a doorway with pilasters and a moulded open segmental pediment, above which is an inscribed plaque.
Admarsh Barn Farmhouse and barn 53.91180°N 2.64865°W	—	1814	The house and attached barn are in sandstone with slate roofs. The house has two storeys and three bays. The windows are sashes with plain surrounds. The round-headed doorway has a plain surround with a keystone, and above it is a plaque containing the date. The barn to the left has a wide entrance, a window with a quoined surround, a pitching hole, and a doorway.
St Eadmer's Church; 53.90407°N 2.65052°W		1835	The chancel was added in 1897. The church is in rendered stone and has a slate roof. It consists of a west tower, a nave, a south porch, and a chancel with its roof at a lower level. The tower contains two re-set mullioned west windows, one above the other, and has a parapet with stepped corners. The windows on the sides of the nave are lancets, and the east window contains Perpendicular tracery. Inside the church is a west gallery.
