= Juniper Gulf =

Cave in North Yorkshire, England

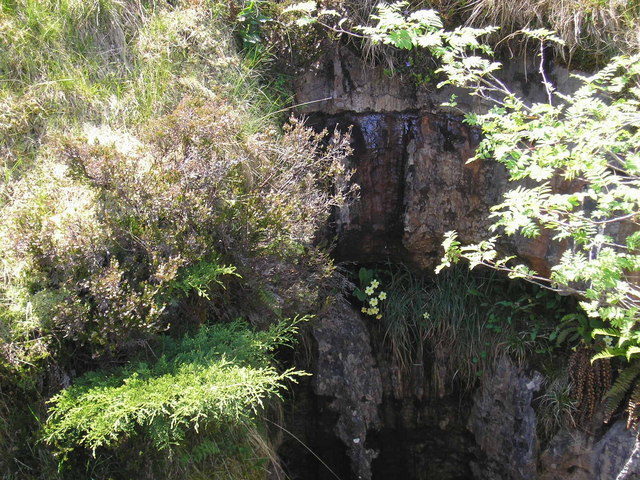
- The entrance to Juniper Gulf

- Location within Yorkshire Dales
- Location: Yorkshire, Northern England
- Coordinates: 54°09′19″N 2°21′36″W
- Depth: 128 metres (420 ft)
- Length: 244 metres (801 ft)
- Hazards: Very vertical
- Access: Public

Juniper Gulf is a pit cave in on the side of Ingleborough in Yorkshire, England. It is a popular single rope technique (SRT) trip for cavers, especially known for its final 50-metre (160 ft) pitch.
