= Grit Fell =

Hill in Lancashire, England

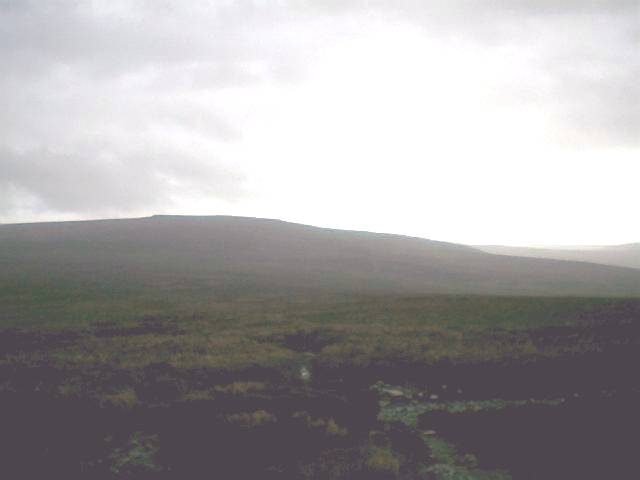
- Looking east from Grit Fell towards Ward's Stone

Highest point
- Elevation: 468 m (1,535 ft)
- Prominence: c. 33 m (108 ft)
- Coordinates: 54°01′24″N 2°40′40″W

Geography
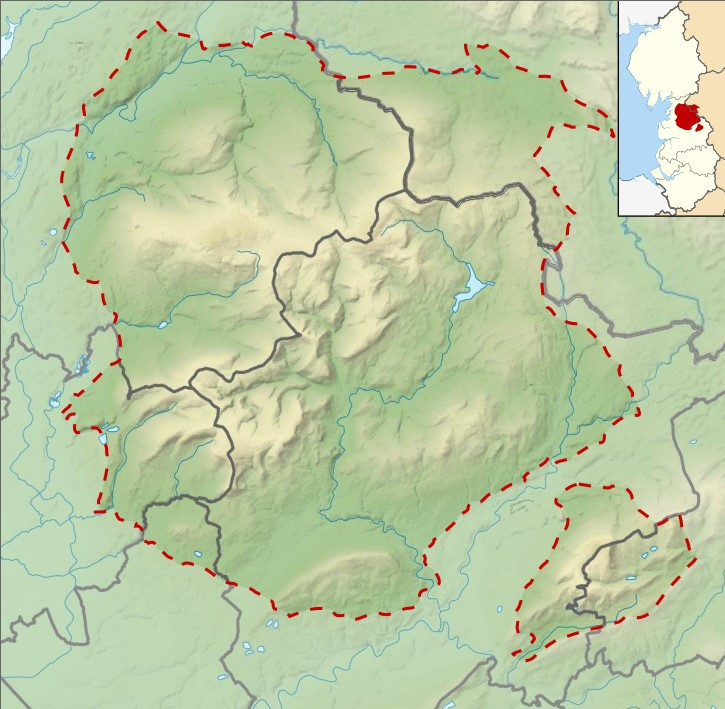
- Location within the Forest of Bowland Location within Lancashire Location within the City of Lancaster district
- Location: Forest of Bowland, England
- OS grid: SD557588
- Topo map: OS Landranger 102

Grit Fell is a lonely hill between Clougha Pike and Ward's Stone in the Forest of Bowland in Lancashire, England. Covered by heather and large bogs, it is difficult walking country. The path from Jubilee Tower car park in the south is difficult and treacherous, with sheer-sided bogs 6 feet (1.83 m) deep. The path from Clougha Pike in the west is better, but still contains bogs crossed by the odd plank of wood. The path from Ward's Stone is the most treacherous of all. Crossing Cabin Flat, it weaves its way across hidden pools of stagnant water, the presence of which is betrayed by a form of red grass.

The summit is fairly inconspicuous, with only cairns and a wall.
