= Bleasdale =

Coordinates: 53.904°N 2.651°W

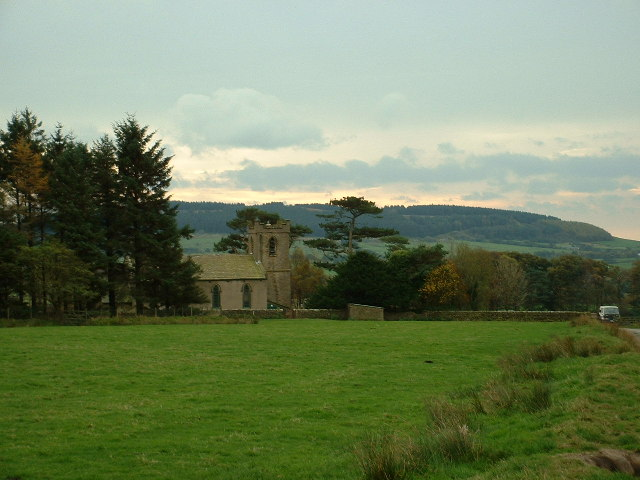
- Saint Eadmer's church, across fields

- Location in Wyre Borough Location in the Forest of Bowland Location within Lancashire
- Population: 167 (2011)
- OS grid reference: SD572455
- Civil parish: Bleasdale
- District: Wyre
- Shire county: Lancashire
- Region: North West
- Country: England
- Sovereign state: United Kingdom
- Post town: PRESTON
- Postcode district: PR3
- Dialling code: 01995
- Police: Lancashire
- Fire: Lancashire
- Ambulance: North West
- UK Parliament: Lancaster and Wyre

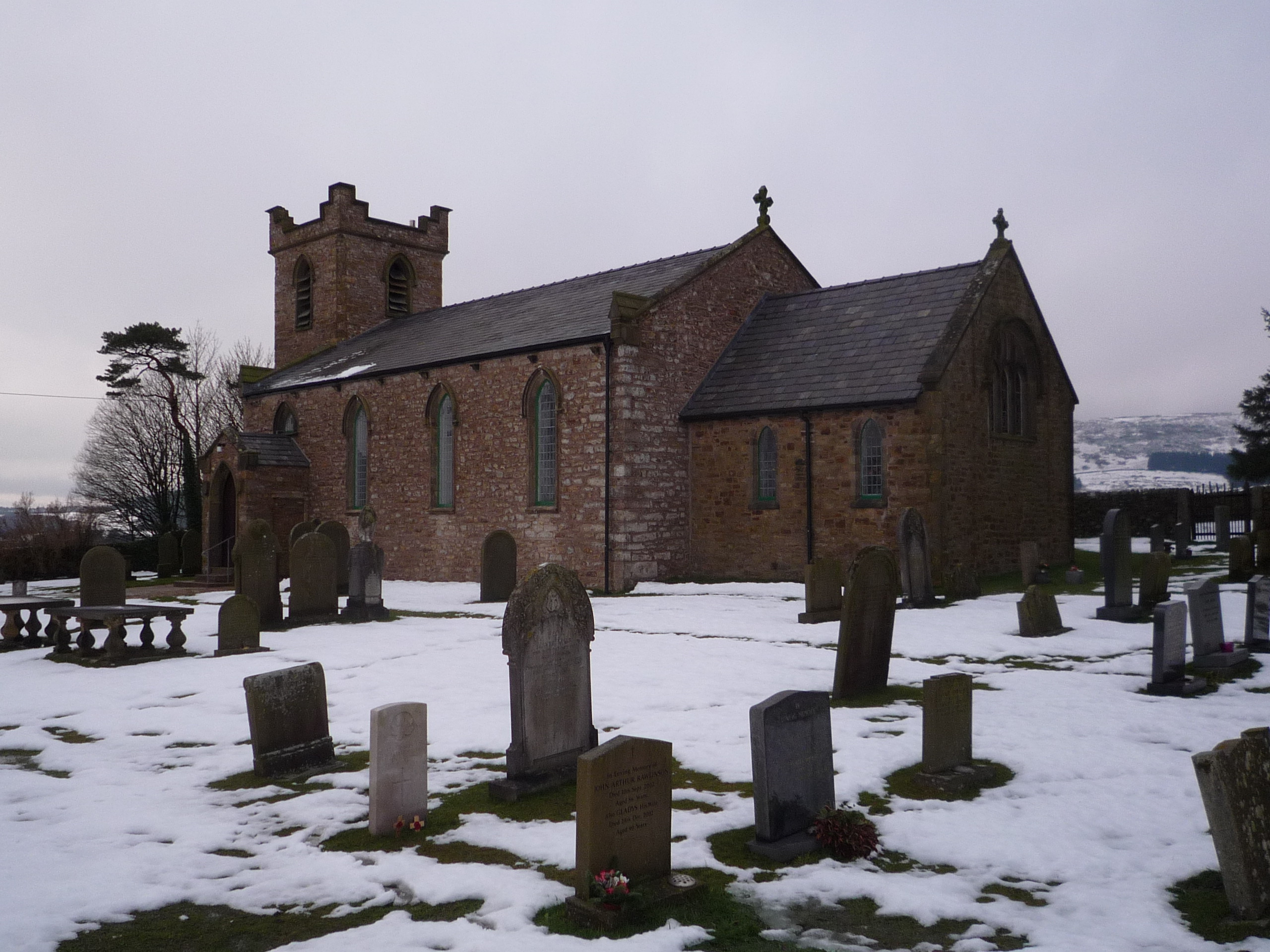
Saint Eadmer's church

Bleasdale is a village and civil parish in the Wyre district of Lancashire, England, in the Forest of Bowland Area of Outstanding Natural Beauty. The two sources of the River Brock lie within the parish. According to the 2001 census, it had a population of 147, increasing to 167 at the 2011 Census.

== Landmarks ==
Within the parish are:

- Bleasdale parish church, the only one in the United Kingdom (and possibly in the world) dedicated to Saint Eadmer.
- Bleasdale Circle, a Bronze Age circular earthwork, originally with an outer ring (at grid reference SD577460) and possibly aligned with the sunrise of the Summer Solstice.
- Bleasdale Church of England Primary School (closed in August 2019).
- The Parish Hall, built in 1929.
- The former post office, housed in the forge opposite Higher Brock Mill (at grid reference SD574445) on the River Brock, supporting brown and rainbow trout. From 1947 to 2002 the post office housed a café for locals, cycling and hiking folk to refresh, fitted with a well, dating from about 1700, beneath the building. In the early 1900s, "Jack Custard" was renowned there for the quality of his custard tart.

The ancient Forest of Bleasdale is less well known than its more famous neighbour, the Forest of Bowland but its history is recounted by Smith. Being a part of Wyresdale, Bleasdale never fell under the sway of the powerful medieval Lordship of Bowland.

== Notable buildings ==
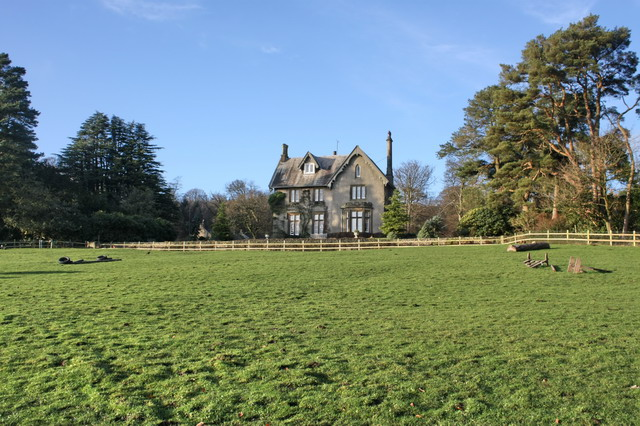
Bleasdale Tower

- St Eadmer's Church was rebuilt in 1835 by John Dewhurst and restored and enlarged in 1897. It has a west tower and lancet windows. The church retains its pews and western gallery.
- Bleasdale Tower was built in the early 19th century by William Garnett.
- Clough Heads Cottages was once a boy's Reformatory School.

== Geodesy ==
"Paddy's Pole" on Fair Snape Fell in Bleasdale parish was the origin (meridian) of the 6 inch and 1:2500 Ordnance Survey maps for Lancashire.

== See also ==
- Listed buildings in Bleasdale
