= Jane Routh =

British Poet

Jane Routh is a contemporary poet living in Lancashire in the United Kingdom.

== Published works ==
To date she has published five collections of poetry:

- Listening to the Night (Smith/Doorstop, 2018)
- The Gift of Boats (Smith/Doorstop, 2010)
- Waiting for H5N1 (Templar Poetry, 2007)
- Teach Yourself Mapmaking (Smith/Doorstop, 2006)
- Circumnavigation (Smith/Doorstop, 2002)

Routh has also published a place journal Falling Into Place (Smith/Doorstop, 2014).

== Awards ==
Routh's first collection Circumnavigation was shortlisted for the Forward Prize for Best First Collection. Her second collection Teach Yourself Mapmaking was a Poetry Book Society Recommendation. The Gift of Boats won the Cardiff International Poetry Competition.
