= Listed buildings in Newton, Ribble Valley =

Newton is a civil parish in Ribble Valley, Lancashire, England. It contains 28 listed buildings that are recorded in the National Heritage List for England. Of these, one is at Grade II*, the middle grade, and the others are at Grade II, the lowest grade. The parish contains the village of Newton-in-Bowland, and is otherwise rural. The listed buildings are mainly houses with associated structures, farmhouses, and farm buildings, both in the village and in the surrounding countryside. The other listed buildings include bridges, a public house, a Friends' meeting house, and a former school.

== Key ==
| Grade | Criteria |
|---|---|
| II* | Particularly important buildings of more than special interest |
| II | Buildings of national importance and special interest |

== Buildings ==
| Name and location | Photograph | Date | Notes | Grade |
|---|---|---|---|---|
| Foulscales; 53.93828°N 2.47021°W | | Early 17th century (probable) | A sandstone house with a stone-slate roof in two storeys. Most of the windows are mullioned, some have been altered, and in the upper floor is a six-light window. The doorway has plain jambs and a re-set triangular head. The west gable wall is rendered and contains a possible garderobe projection. There is an outshut on the east gable wall. | II |
| Higher Birkett Farmhouse and buildings 53.93675°N 2.48607°W | | 1686 | This consists of the present farmhouse, dating from the late 18th century, the former house, dated 1686, and a barn, all in sandstone with a slate roof. The present house has two storeys and three bays, and the windows are mullioned. The barn contains a wide entrance, a door with a plain surround, and two pitching doors. | II |
| Barn, Hydes Farm; 53.95010°N 2.46130°W | | 1687 | The barn is in limestone with sandstone dressings and a slate roof. In the northwest wall is a wide entrance with long-and-short jambs and a chamfered triangular head, and a doorway with a chamfered surround and a triangular head. Above the wide entrance is an inscribed plaque. In the left gable wall are a doorway, two windows, a pitching door, and an owl hole. | II |
| Smelthwaites Farmhouse; 53.94042°N 2.44076°W | — | 1688 | The farmhouse is in sandstone with a stone-slate roof, and has two storeys. On the front are sash windows, a doorway with a plain surround and a re-set, shaped, inscribed lintel, and a modern garage entrance. At the rear, some of the windows are sashes, other are mullioned, fixed, or blocked. | II |
| Salisbury Hall; 53.94962°N 2.46376°W | — | Early 18th century | A pebbledashed house with sandstone dressings and a slate roof, in two storeys with an attic, and four bays. The ground floor contains three-light mullioned windows, and in the upper floor there are cross windows. The main doorway has a chamfered surround and a battlemented lintel, and to the left is a doorway with a plain surround. | II |
| Farm building, Storth; 53.93712°N 2.46327°W | — | Early 18th century (possible) | The farm building is in sandstone with a slate roof, and has two storeys. In the east wall are two doorways. One has long-and-short jambs, the other has a chamfered surround, and between them is a former doorway, converted into a window, with chamfered jambs. Above each of these is a circular pitching hole. In the north gable wall are a window, a pitching hole, and the entrances to the nest boxes of a dovecote. | II |
| Wall, gates and gate piers, Newton Hall; 53.94869°N 2.46202°W | — | 18th century | The wall is in stone with a moulded sandstone coping. It contains two square sandstone gate piers, each with a moulded cornice and a pineapple finial. The gates are in wrought iron. | II |
| Gatepiers, Salisbury Hall; 53.94949°N 2.46346°W | — | 18th century | The gate piers are in sandstone. They have a square plan, and each pier has a moulded cornice and an acorn finial. | II |
| Newton Hall; 53.94883°N 2.46210°W | | Mid to late 18th century | A house in limestone with sandstone dressings and a slate roof. It has two storeys with an attic, and a symmetrical front of four bays. The windows are sashes with architraves. The central doorway has an architrave, a pulvinated frieze, and a moulded pediment on console brackets. Flanking the house are short walls with semicircular-headed gateways. To the left, and set back, is a wing with mullioned windows, and at the rear of the house is a canted bay window. | II* |
| Parker's Arms; 53.94865°N 2.46247°W | | Mid to late 18th century | Originally the stables to Newton Hall, later converted into a public house. It is in pebbledashed stone with a slate roof, and has two storeys and a symmetrical five-bay front. There are three-light mullioned windows containing sashes in the ground floor, and two in the upper floor. In the centre of the upper floor is a Venetian window, and this is flanked by two windows with semicircular heads. The two doorways have plain surrounds, semicircular heads, keystones and imposts. | II |
| Friends' Meeting House and cottage 53.94894°N 2.46586°W | | 1767 | The building is in limestone with sandstone dressings, and has a roof of blue slate at the front and stone-slate at the rear. It is in one and two storeys, with a cellar, and an outshut at the rear of the cottage. The windows are mullioned, and the doorways have plain surrounds and hoods of pitched slates. The cottage, to the left, has one bay, and above the doorway is an inscribed plaque with a moulded border. The meeting house has three bays, and inside it there is a gallery. | II |
| 1, 2 and 3 Sunnyside; 53.94991°N 2.46265°W | | Late 18th century | A house and two cottages in sandstone with a slate roof, it has two storeys, and contains sash windows. The house, in the centre, has three bays, and the flanking cottages have one bay each. The cottage doorways have plain surrounds. The doorway of the house has Tuscan pilasters, a semicircular head with imposts and a keystone, and an ogee pediment. | II |
| Boarsden Farmhouse; 53.94786°N 2.49009°W | | Late 18th century | A sandstone house with a slate roof, in two storeys with an attic, and three bays. Most of the windows are mullioned, and the doorway in the east gable wall has a plain surround. At the rear is a stair window with sashes. | II |
| Crag House; 53.94909°N 2.46316°W | — | Late 18th century (probable) | The house is in stone with a slate roof, and has two storeys with attics. Some of the windows are sashes, others are fixed or mullioned, or have been altered or blocked. There are two doorways, both with plain surrounds. | II |
| East View; 53.94905°N 2.46304°W | — | Late 18th century | A house in pebbledashed stone with sandstone dressings, chamfered quoins, and a slate roof, in three storeys and three bays. Most of the windows are sashes, and the central doorway has an architrave, a pulvinated frieze, and a cornice. In the right gable wall is a mullioned window. | II |
| Long Stripes Farmhouse; 53.94120°N 2.45911°W | — | Late 18th century (possible) | The farmhouse is rendered with a roof partly in slate and partly in stone-slate. There are two storeys and three bays, and the windows are sashes with architraves. One doorway has a plain surround. The other has a large sandstone doorcase moved from elsewhere. This has Tuscan pilasters, a broken pediment, and a frieze with triglyphs, carved roses, and a stag's head in the centre. | II |
| Lower Birkett Farmhouse; 53.93736°N 2.48470°W | — | Late 18th century | A sandstone house with a stone-slate roof, in two storeys and two bays. The windows are sashes, and the doorway has a plain surround. At the rear is an eight-light weaving window with mullions, some lights being fixed and others with sashes. | II |
| Marl Hill Farmhouse; 53.92230°N 2.48440°W | | Late 18th century | The farmhouse is in stone with a slate roof, and has two storeys and two bays. The windows have three lights and square mullions, and the central doorway has a plain surround. | II |
| Newton Bridge; 53.94761°N 2.46097°W | | Late 18th century (probable) | The bridge carries the B6478 road over the River Hodder. It is in sandstone and consists of two segmental arches with a triangular cutwater. The bridge has a solid parapet, weathered coping, and a string course. | II |
| Newton House and Lowlands Cottage; 53.94960°N 2.46285°W | — | Late 18th century | A pair of stone houses with a slate roof, in three storeys and five bays. The windows have three lights and are mullioned, and the doorways have plain surrounds. At the right end external stone steps lead to a first floor doorway. | II |
| Old Reading Room; 53.94945°N 2.46324°W | | Late 18th century | A former library, it was altered in 1830, and the top storey was removed in the 1960s. It is in limestone with sandstone dressings and a slate roof, and has two storeys. On the front is a central doorway with a plain surround, to the left is a wide entrance with a segmental head and voussoirs, and to the right is a mullioned window. In the upper floor is a six-light weaving window. The rear is partly built into a hillside, with a central doorway that has a semicircular head with a keystone, imposts, and an inscribed tympanum. | II |
| Oxenhurst Farmhouse; 53.96194°N 2.49748°W | — | Late 18th century | A sandstone house with a slate roof, in two storeys and two bays. The windows have plain surrounds and mullions, and the doorway is in the centre. | II |
| Hydes Farmhouse; 53.95013°N 2.46110°W | — | c. 1800 | The house is in stone with a slate roof, and has two storeys. The windows are mullioned, and in the upper floor is a seven-light weaving window, some of the lights containing sashes. The doorway has a plain surround and a modern porch. | II |
| Birkett Bridge; 53.93738°N 2.48447°W | | Early 19th century (probable) | The bridge carries a road over Birkett Brook. It is in sandstone, and consists of a single segmental arch with a solid parapet, a string course, and weathered coping. | II |
| Giddy Bridge; 53.93995°N 2.48493°W | | Early 19th century (probable) | The bridge carries a road over Birkett Brook. It is in sandstone, and consists of a single segmental arch with a solid parapet, a string course, and weathered coping. | II |
| Lowlands Farmhouse and barns 53.94955°N 2.46198°W | — | Early 19th century (probable) | The building contains some 17th-century material. It is in limestone with sandstone dressings and a slate roof, and has two storeys. The house has two bays and contains sash windows. The central doorway has moulded jambs and a shaped inscribed and decorated lintel. To the left is an agricultural building containing a pitching hole. To the right is a barn that has a wide opening with voussoirs and a blocked door. In the right gable wall are two doors that have been converted into windows, and a doorway with a re-set inscribed lintel. (Note: Street View in May 2011 shows that the agricultural building and the barn have been converted for domestic use.) | II |
| Old School; 53.94994°N 2.46167°W | | 1842 | The former school is in sandstone with a slate roof, and it has one storey and four bays. The windows are mullioned and contain diagonal glazing bars. In the centre is a tall gable with coping and a bellcote. Beneath it is a doorway with a chamfered surround and a hood mould, and within the hood mould is an inscribed plaque. | II |
| Schoolhouse Cottage; 53.94988°N 2.46176°W | — | 1842 | A limestone cottage with sandstone dressings and a slate roof, in two storeys and two bays. The windows and doorway have chamfered surrounds and hood moulds. The windows contain diagonal glazing bars and those in the lower floor are mullioned. | II |

== Notes and references ==
=== Sources ===
- Historic England, "Foulscales, Newton (1072254)", National Heritage List for England
- Historic England, "Higher Birkett Farmhouse and buildings adjoining to the east, Newton (1072255)", National Heritage List for England
- Historic England, "Barn south-west of Hydes Farmhouse, Newton (1163475)", National Heritage List for England
- Historic England, "Smelthwaites Farmhouse, Newton (1072213)", National Heritage List for England
- Historic England, "Salisbury Hall, Newton (1362272)", National Heritage List for England
- Historic England, "Farm building, approximately 150 metres south of farmhouse, Storth, Newton (1362290)", National Heritage List for England
- Historic England, "Wall, gatepiers and gates south of Newton Hall (1362271)", National Heritage List for England
- Historic England, "Gatepiers south-east of Salisbury Hall, Newton (1163422)", National Heritage List for England
- Historic England, "Newton Hall (1072246)", National Heritage List for England
- Historic England, "Parker's Arms, Newton (1318254)", National Heritage List for England
- Historic England, "Friends' Meeting House and cottage, Newton (1072245)", National Heritage List for England
- Historic England, "Nos. 1, 2 and 3 Sunnyside, Newton (1163458)", National Heritage List for England
- Historic England, "Boarsden Farmhouse, Newton (1072253)", National Heritage List for England
- Historic England, "Crag House, Newton (1163405)", National Heritage List for England
- Historic England, "East View, Newton (1072247)", National Heritage List for England
- Historic England, "Long Stripes Farmhouse, Newton (1163535)", National Heritage List for England
- Historic England, "Lower Birkett Farmhouse, Newton (1072256)", National Heritage List for England
- Historic England, "Marl Hill Farmhouse, Newton (1362289)", National Heritage List for England
- Historic England, "Newton Bridge (1163370)", National Heritage List for England
- Historic England, "Newton House and Lowlands Cottage, Newton (1072249)", National Heritage List for England
- Historic England, "The Old Reading Room, Newton (1072248)", National Heritage List for England
- Historic England, "Oxenhurst Farmhouse, Newton (1072212)", National Heritage List for England
- Historic England, "Hydes Farmhouse, Newton (1072250)", National Heritage List for England
- Historic England, "Birkett Bridge, Newton (1163517)", National Heritage List for England
- Historic England, "Giddy Bridge, Newton (1318203)", National Heritage List for England
- Historic England, "Lowlands Farmhouse and barns adjoining to north and south, Newton (1072252)", National Heritage List for England
- Historic England, "The Old School, Newton (1072251)", National Heritage List for England
- Historic England, "Schoolhouse Cottage, Newton (1163486)", National Heritage List for England
- Historic England, Listed Buildings
