= Easington Fell =

Fell in Lancashire, England, UK

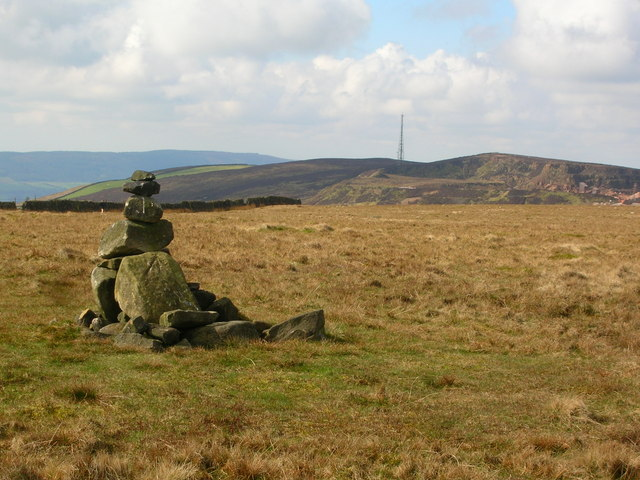
- Cairn on Easington Fell

Highest point
- Elevation: 396 m (1,299 ft)
- Listing: Marilyn
- Coordinates: 53°56′01″N 2°24′43″W

Geography
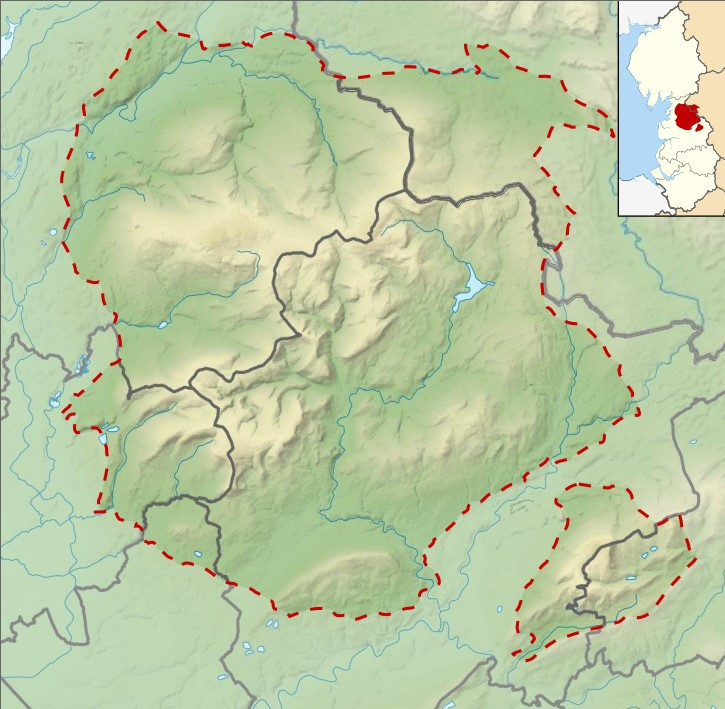
- Location within the Forest of Bowland Location within Lancashire Location within the Borough of Ribble Valley
- Location: Lancashire, England
- Parent range: Forest of Bowland
- OS grid: SD730486

Easington Fell is a Marilyn in the Forest of Bowland in Lancashire, England. It has been surveyed to be 70 cm (28 in) higher than a nearby fell of almost identical height, namely, Waddington Fell. This is visible in the background of the photo.
