= Simon Fell (Yorkshire Dales) =

Hill in England

Coordinates: 54.1718°N 2.3770°W

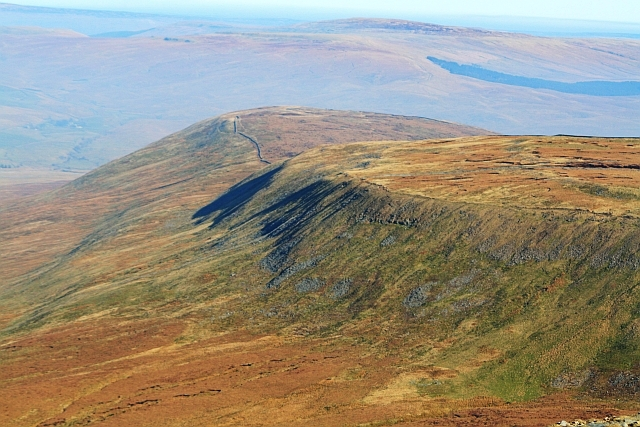
Simon Fell seen from summit of Ingleborough, with Souther Scales Fell beyond

Simon Fell is a subsidiary summit on the north east ridge of Ingleborough, a mountain in the Yorkshire Dales in Northern England.

With a height of 650 metres (2,130 ft) and a prominence of 35 metres (115 ft), it is classified as a Hewitt.
