= Calf Top =

Mountain in England

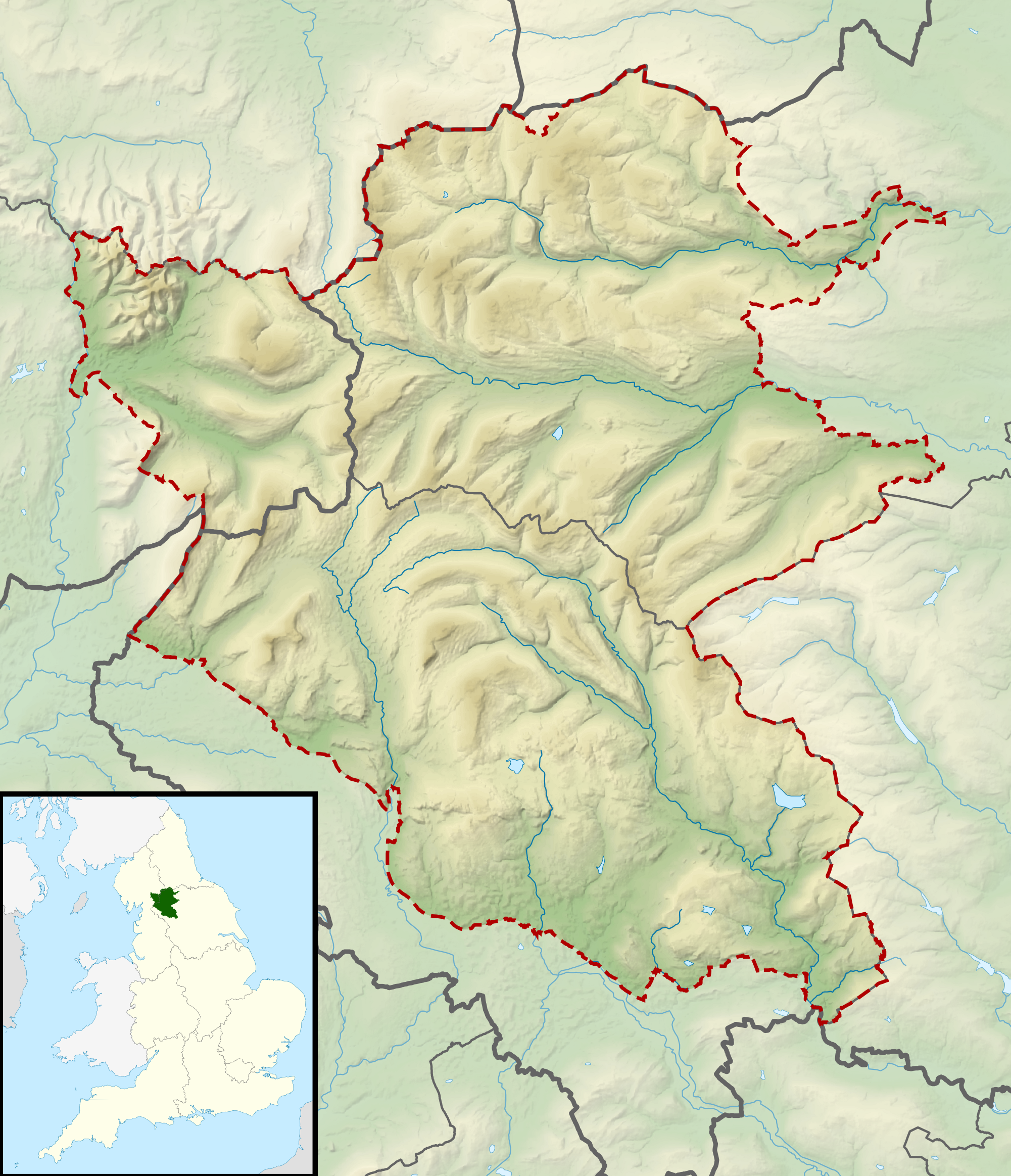
- Location within Yorkshire Dales

Highest point
- Elevation: 610 m (2,000 ft)
- Prominence: 312 m
- Parent peak: Whernside
- Listing: Marilyn, Dewey
- Coordinates: 54°15′55″N 2°31′00″W

Geography
- Location: Yorkshire Dales, England
- OS grid: SD 66449 85624
- Topo map: OS Landranger 98

Calf Top is a mountain in the western part of the Yorkshire Dales, England. It is located in the county of Cumbria, although Lancashire and North Yorkshire are not far away. Calf Top is a dominating profile in the view from many of the smaller hills to its west, such as Lambrigg Fell and Hutton Roof Crags.

Calf Top is separated from its neighbours, Great Coum and Aye Gill Pike, by the deep trench of Barbondale, meaning that although it is lower than most of the hills in its region, it has high relative height and is a Marilyn.

== Status as a mountain ==
The height was formerly shown on Ordnance Survey maps as 609 metres. The closeness of this figure to the threshold of 2,000 feet (609.6 m) used in the United Kingdom to separate mountains and hills led to the summit being surveyed using precision GPS and levelling equipment. The height was found to be 609.58 ± 0.1 m, or fractionally below 2,000 feet. The result was discussed with the authors of the Nuttalls, Hewitts and Deweys who all agreed that the hill should retain its current status as a member of Dewey's list of hills at least 500 metres but less than 609.6 metres high. Current OS maps show the height rounded to 610 metres.

The Ordnance Survey recalculated the height of the mountain in 2016 when the authoritative definition of the British national height datum, Ordnance Datum Newlyn, was transitioned from the OSGM02 geoid model to the OSGM05 version, causing a general upwards shift of 25mm in orthometric heights. This resulted in a height of 609.606 metres, thus updating the status of Calf Top from hill to mountain.
