= Fair Snape Fell =

Hill in Lancashire, England

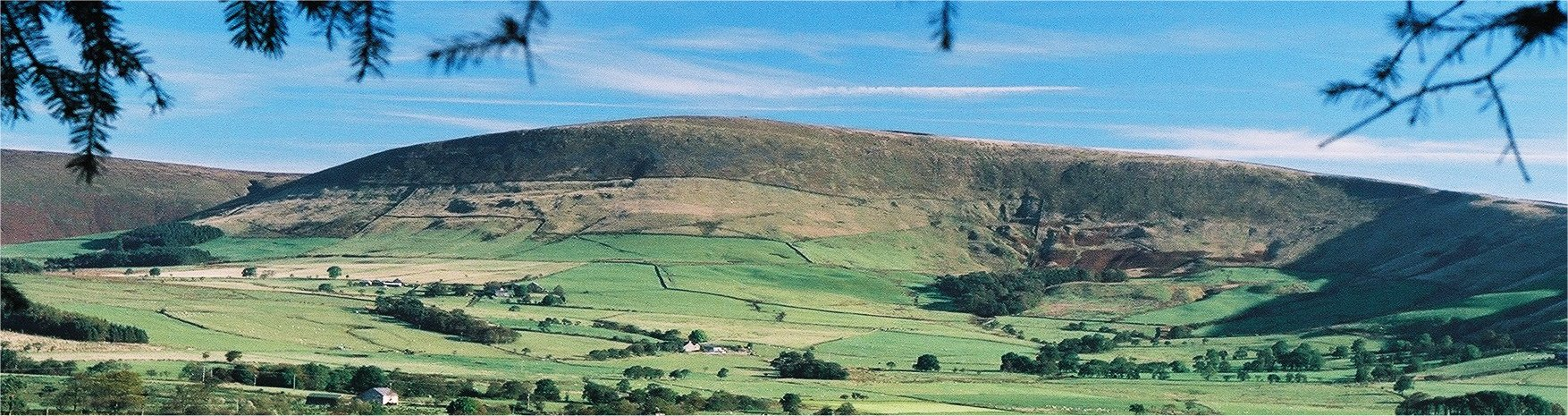
- Fair Snape Fell from the south-west

Highest point
- Elevation: 521.9 m (1,712 ft)
- Prominence: 226.2 m (742 ft)
- Parent peak: Ward's Stone
- Listing: Marilyn
- Coordinates: 53.91936°N 2.61509°W

Geography
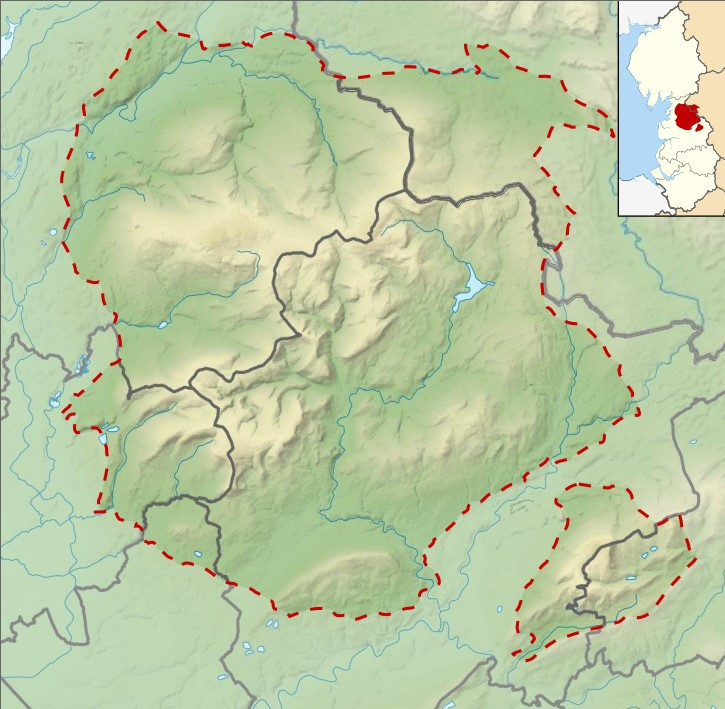
- Location within the Forest of Bowland Location within Lancashire Location within the Borough of Wyre Location within the Borough of Ribble Valley
- Location: Lancashire, England
- Parent range: Forest of Bowland
- OS grid: SD597472
- Topo map: OS Landranger 102

Fair Snape Fell is one of the larger hills in the Forest of Bowland in Lancashire, England. It reaches 521.9 m (1,712 ft) with a prominence of 226.2 m (742 ft) and is classed as a Marilyn. It occupies a position in the very south of the main range of fells, alongside and just to the north of Parlick, to which it is joined by a ridge. The main paths approach the summit from Parlick in the south, Saddle Fell in the east and Bleasdale in the valley to the west. The Saddle Fell approach is as boggy as the hills to the north. The summit is covered in grass and peat groughs. A trig point and large cairn occupy the top of the western escarpment, with the highest point being about 700 metres (770 yd) to the north-east.

The word snape means "pasture"; thus Fair Snape Fell may mean "fell of the fair (beautiful) pasture". However, Wyld and Hirst give the meaning as far = sheep; snape = poor boggy pasture land, therefore sheep pasture.

Considerable areas of the Bowland fells were used for military training during World War II and there are still unexploded bombs in some areas, including nearby Wolf Fell.

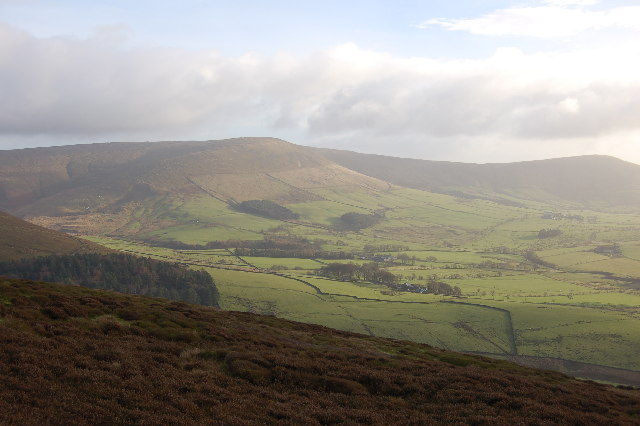
Fair Snape Fell (left) and Parlick (right) viewed from the west

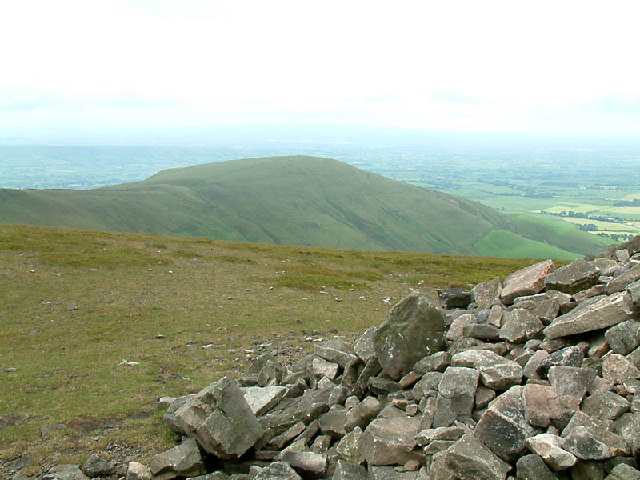
View from the trig point on Fair Snape Fell, looking down on Parlick.
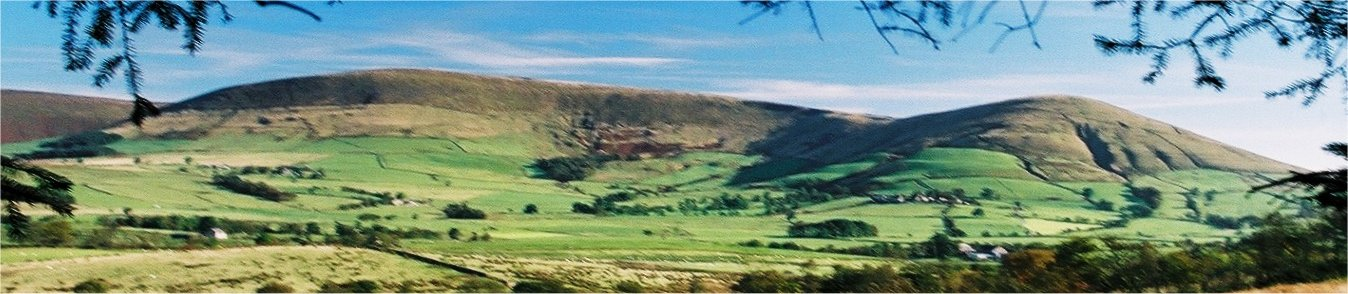
Fair Snape Fell (left) and Parlick (right) viewed from the south-west
