= White Hill (Forest of Bowland) =

Hill in northern England

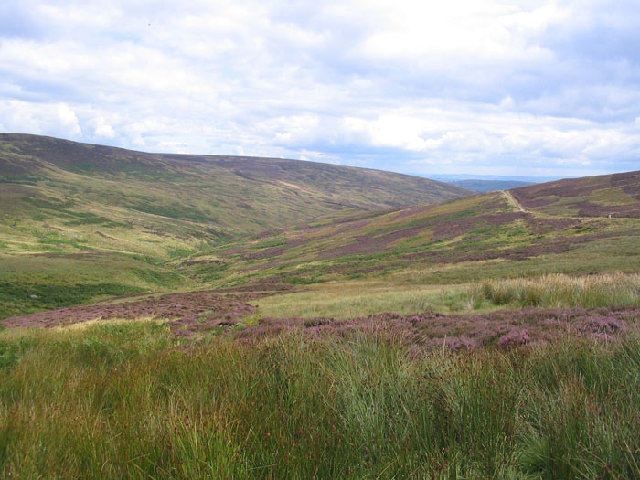
- The valley of Croasdale, with the slopes of White Hill on the left

Highest point
- Elevation: 544 m (1,785 ft)
- Prominence: 159 m (522 ft)
- Parent peak: Ward's Stone
- Listing: Marilyn
- Coordinates: 54°01′24″N 2°30′02″W

Geography
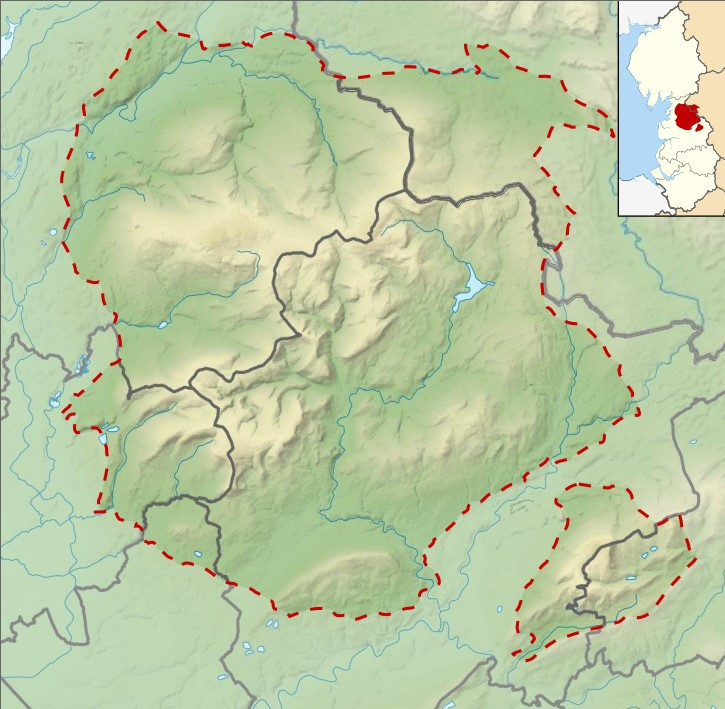
- Location within the Forest of Bowland Location within Lancashire Location within the City of Lancaster district Location within the Borough of Ribble Valley
- Location: Forest of Bowland, England
- OS grid: SD673587
- Topo map: OS Landranger 103

White Hill is a hill in the Forest of Bowland in north-western England. It lies between Slaidburn and High Bentham, on the boundary between the City of Lancaster and Ribble Valley districts. The summit houses a tower and a trig point. In medieval times, the hill marked one of the northernmost limits of the Lordship of Bowland.

The hill has an elevation of 544 m (1,785 ft) and a prominence of 159 m (522 ft) and is classed as a Marilyn.
