= Mounsey =

Mounsey is a surname. Notable people with the surname include:

- Ann Mounsey (1811–1891), British organist and composer
- Augustus Henry Mounsey (1834–1882), British diplomat
- Elizabeth Mounsey (1819–1905), British organist and composer, sister of Ann
- Rob Mounsey (born 1952), American musician, composer, and arranger
- Tara Mounsey (born 1978), American ice hockey player
- William Mounsey (disambiguation), multiple people
