= Ann Bartholomew =

Ann Bartholomew may refer to:

- Ann Mounsey Bartholomew (1811–1891), British pianist, organist and composer
- Ann Charlotte Bartholomew (1800–1862), English painter and author

== See also ==
- Anne of St. Bartholomew (1550–1626), Spanish Roman Catholic professed religious
