= George Thalben-Ball =

British organist and composer

Sir George Thomas Thalben-Ball CBE (18 June 1896 – 18 January 1987) was an organist and composer born in Australia who spent almost all his life in England.

== Early life ==
George Thomas Ball (he later took the additional name of "Thalben") was born in Sydney, where his father George Charles Ball had gone for business. His mother was Mary Hannah (née Spear). He had a younger brother. His parents were both of Cornish origin. He studied organ and piano at the Royal College of Music (RCM) in London, which he entered at the unusually young age of 14. The level of his talent can be gleaned from the fact that he played the solo part in the first performance by an English-trained pianist of Rachmaninoff's famously difficult Piano Concerto No. 3. This event occurred in 1915 at the RCM, when he was aged 19.

== Career ==
After graduating from the RCM the young man was asked to deputise as organist at London's Temple Church by its then organist, Sir Henry Walford Davies. In 1923, he succeeded Walford Davies as organist and director of the Temple Church choir, a post he held for nearly 60 years. Under his direction, the choir achieved in 1927 international fame with its recording of Mendelssohn's Hear My Prayer, featuring Ernest Lough as the treble soloist. This recording was followed by a number of others on the His Master's Voice label.

Thalben-Ball composed several anthems and organ works, of which the best known is his meditative Elegy for organ, which was played, for example, at the Funeral of Diana, Princess of Wales. This piece originated in an improvisation which Thalben-Ball played at the end of a live BBC daily religious service during World War II, when the service finished a couple of minutes earlier than expected. So many listeners to the broadcast telephoned the BBC to ask what the composition was, that he decided to write down his improvisation as well as he could remember it. He compiled, in addition, a complete set of chants for the psalms, most of them being his own work; this set was published as The Choral Psalter.

== Awards and posts ==
In 1935 he was awarded the Lambeth degree of Doctor of Music. From that time until his knighthood, he was generally known by his colleagues (as Walford Davies had been known before him) simply as "Doctor".

In 1937 he became a bard of the Cornish Gorsedh, taking the bardic name Ylewyth Mur (Great Musician).

A regular radio broadcaster, Thalben-Ball also carried out numerous performances in many concert venues, not only in Britain; he gave the inaugural recitals on the organs of the Royal Albert Hall (where he had the post of curator organist) and the BBC Concert Hall. In 1949, he was appointed Birmingham City Organist and Birmingham University Organist, a post he held for three decades. During this tenure, he gave over 1,000 weekly recitals. He wrote in 1972 an organ solo called 'Toccata Beorma' as a celebration of his links with the city.

In 1948 Thalben-Ball was elected president of the Royal College of Organists. He had become a fellow of this institution in 1915 (at the age of 18). For many years he taught at the Royal College of Music, where his students included Meredith Davies, later to find fame as a conductor. In 1956 he was the featured artist for the American Guild of Organists' annual national convention.

Thalben-Ball was throughout his life an unashamed virtuoso, whether as pianist, as organist, or as choirmaster. His style of performance (like that of his younger contemporary Virgil Fox in the USA) was rooted in the 19th century, and made full use of every facility of the modern organ. Even when he was playing baroque repertoire, there would be many registration changes, ample swell pedal and dramatic contrasts in volume. He could sight-read, transpose and improvise in any style and at any length to the highest standard without perceptible effort. Long after many organists had taken up the habit of hiring a deputy for choir-training purposes, he retained full control of his choir, without any assistant organist or voice coach.

He was appointed a Commander of the Order of the British Empire (CBE) in 1967 and knighted in 1982. The latter honour was conferred shortly after his retirement from Temple Church.

== Personal life ==
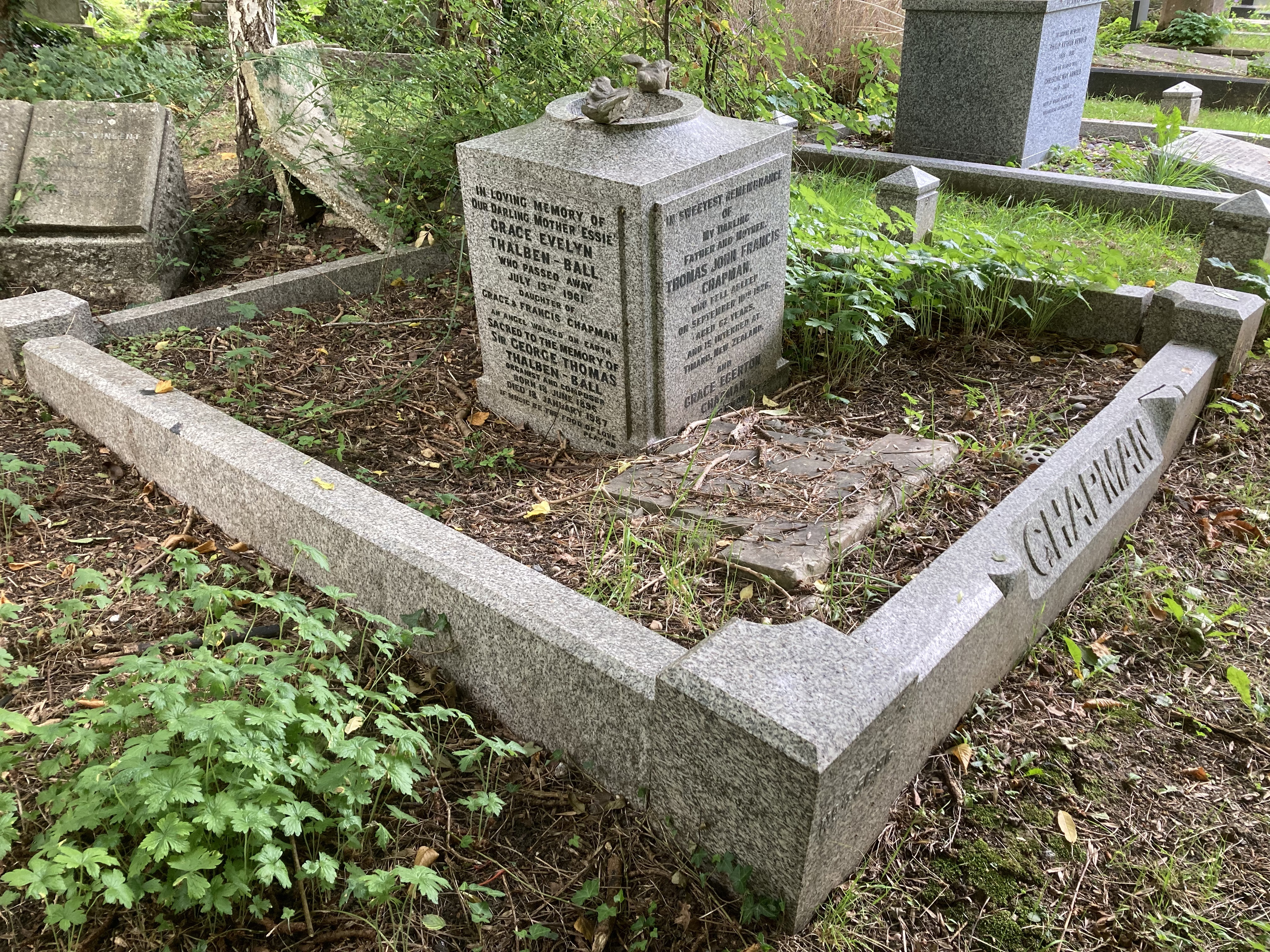
Family grave of Sir George Thomas Thalben-Ball in Highgate Cemetery

He was twice married: firstly, in 1926, to painter Grace Evelyn Chapman, (1888–1961) with whom he had a daughter (Evelyn Pamela, also a painter, 1927–2012) and a son (John Michael, 1932–2004); secondly, in 1968, to the concert organist Jennifer Bate (1944–2020) (marriage annulled 1972).

He was buried on the eastern side of Highgate Cemetery East with his first wife and her parents.
