= Rackwick =

Coordinates: 58.873°N 3.386°W

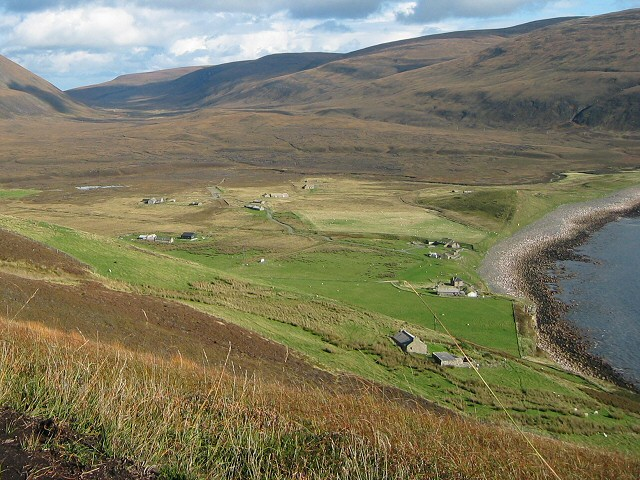
- View of Rackwick from Moor Fea

- Location within Orkney
- OS grid reference: ND201992
- Civil parish: Hoy and Graemsay
- Council area: Orkney
- Lieutenancy area: Orkney
- Country: Scotland
- Sovereign state: United Kingdom
- Post town: STROMNESS
- Postcode district: KW16
- Dialling code: 01856
- Police: Scotland
- Fire: Scottish
- Ambulance: Scottish
- UK Parliament: Orkney and Shetland
- Scottish Parliament: Orkney Islands

Rackwick is a small coastal crofting township in the north west of the island of Hoy in Orkney, Scotland.

As well as a handful of tourist amenities the township is largely made up of crofts and other small dwellings, however most now form second homes with Rackwick having very few full time residents. In 2016 there were only three dwellings occupied year round.

The Orcadian poet George Mackay Brown's poem Rackwick describes the township as "the hidden valley of light" and "Orkney's last enchantment".

The name Rackwick may derive from the Old Norse reka-vík, meaning bay of jetsam.

== Geography ==
Rackwick is surrounded on three sides by the hills Moor Fea, Mel Fea, and Red Glen, with two glacial U-shaped valleys (glens) leading into Rackwick containing two burns (streams), Rackwick Burn and South Burn. The Township overlooks Rackwick Beach and Rackwick Bay, with the adjacent coastline dominated by imposing cliffs. Rackwick also borders the RSPB Hoy nature reserve. There is only one minor road to Rackwick, leading from Linksness 4 miles (6.4 km) away, passing by the Dwarfie Stane megalithic tomb. The township is the main starting point for people walking to the Old Man of Hoy, a notable sea stack 1.5 miles (2.4 km) away.

== Amenities ==
Rackwick has a series of small unstaffed community-run museum buildings and an archive centre, including an old schoolhouse and the restored 18th century Cra'as Nest croft and farmstead. The township also contains a bothy, Burnmouth, run by the Hoy Trust, and the Rackwick Outdoor Centre – a hostel by the Orkney Islands Council in a former school building. There is also public toilets and a small car park.

== History ==
The is little evidence of prehistoric activity in Rackwick, while the older farm buildings date from the 18th century. The first known reference to Rackwick was in Lord Sinclair's 1492 rental of Orkney, and the first detailed map dates from 1791. In 1718 the first schoolhouse (now a museum) was opened by the Society in Scotland for Propagating Christian Knowledge, although this was short lived as the school closed in 1724. In 1879 a new school building was built (now the hostel), closing in 1953 as there were no longer any children left in Rackwick to teach.

Rackwick was home in WWII to a light anti-aircraft battery, two search light batteries, and various small ancillary buildings and structures. There is also a crash site overlooking the township where in 1942 a Fairey Albacore (BF592) hit Mal Fea, killing the pilot.

The township was almost deserted in the 1970s, but has seen a small "resurgence" in part because of George Mackay Brown. The landscape artist Sylvia Wishart, a friend of Brown's, rented a house and painted the township throughout the 1960s, while the composer Peter Maxwell Davies, another of Brown's friends, lived in Rackwick from 1970 until 1998.

Rackwick was the site of early telegraph cables, while the two subsea power cables connecting Orkney to mainland Scotland land at Rackwick Beach.

== Gallery ==
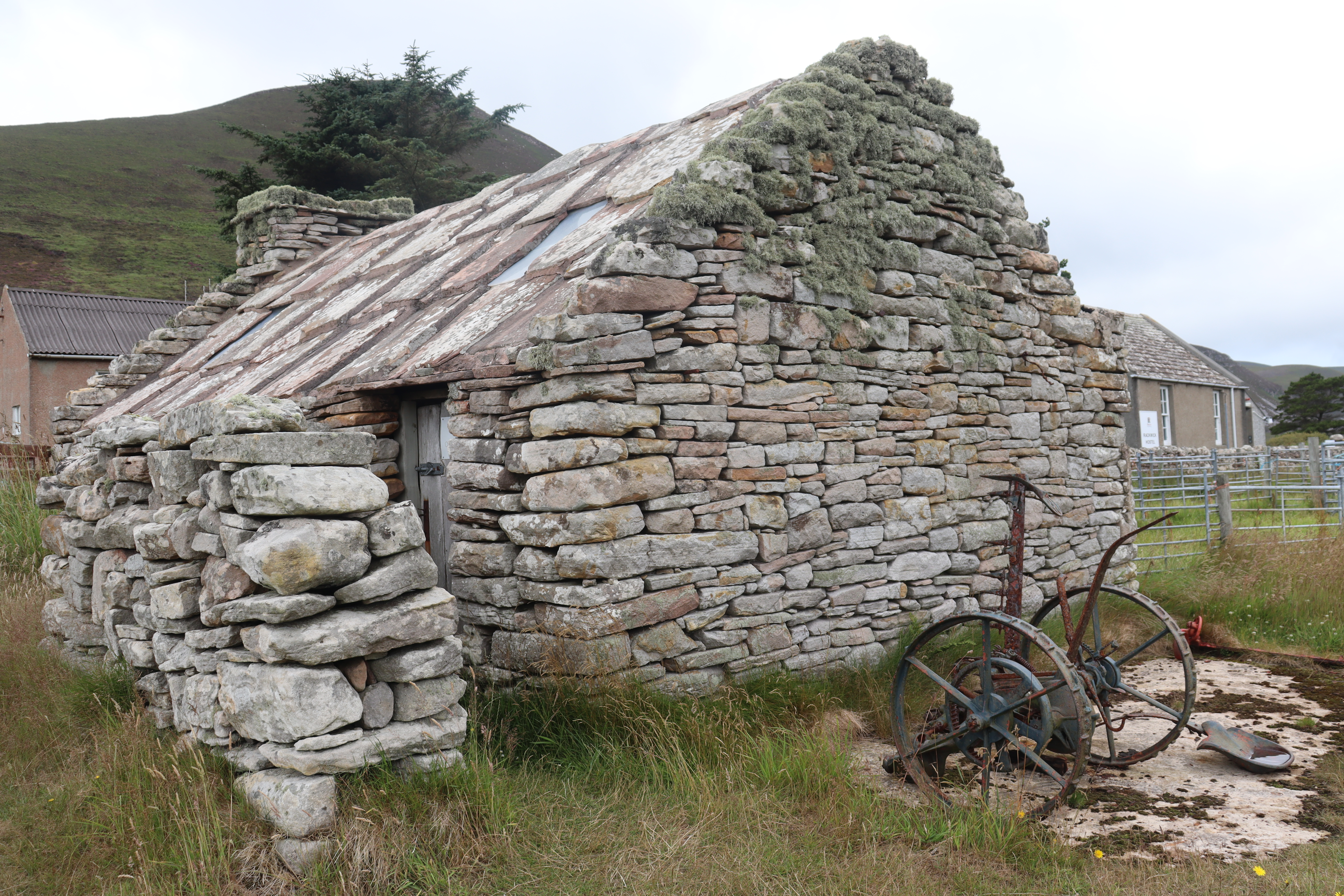
The old schoolhouse built 1718, now a small museum

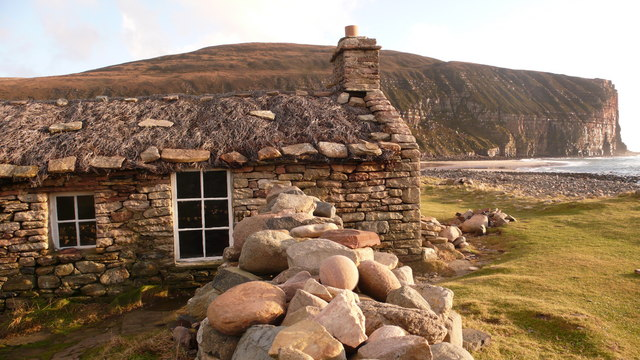
The bothy, Burnmouth

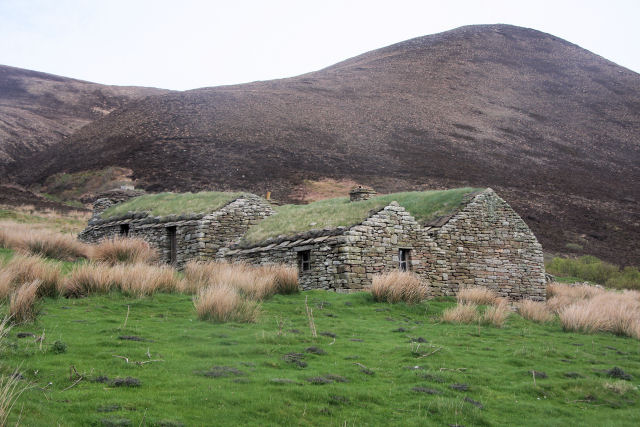
Cra'as Nest Museum, formerly a croft and homestead

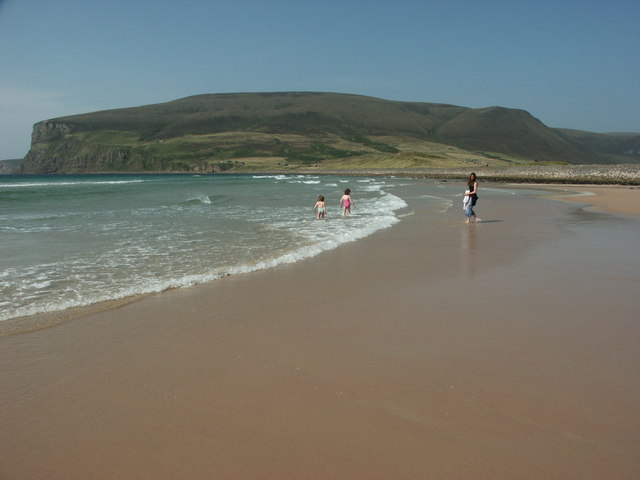
Rackwick Beach

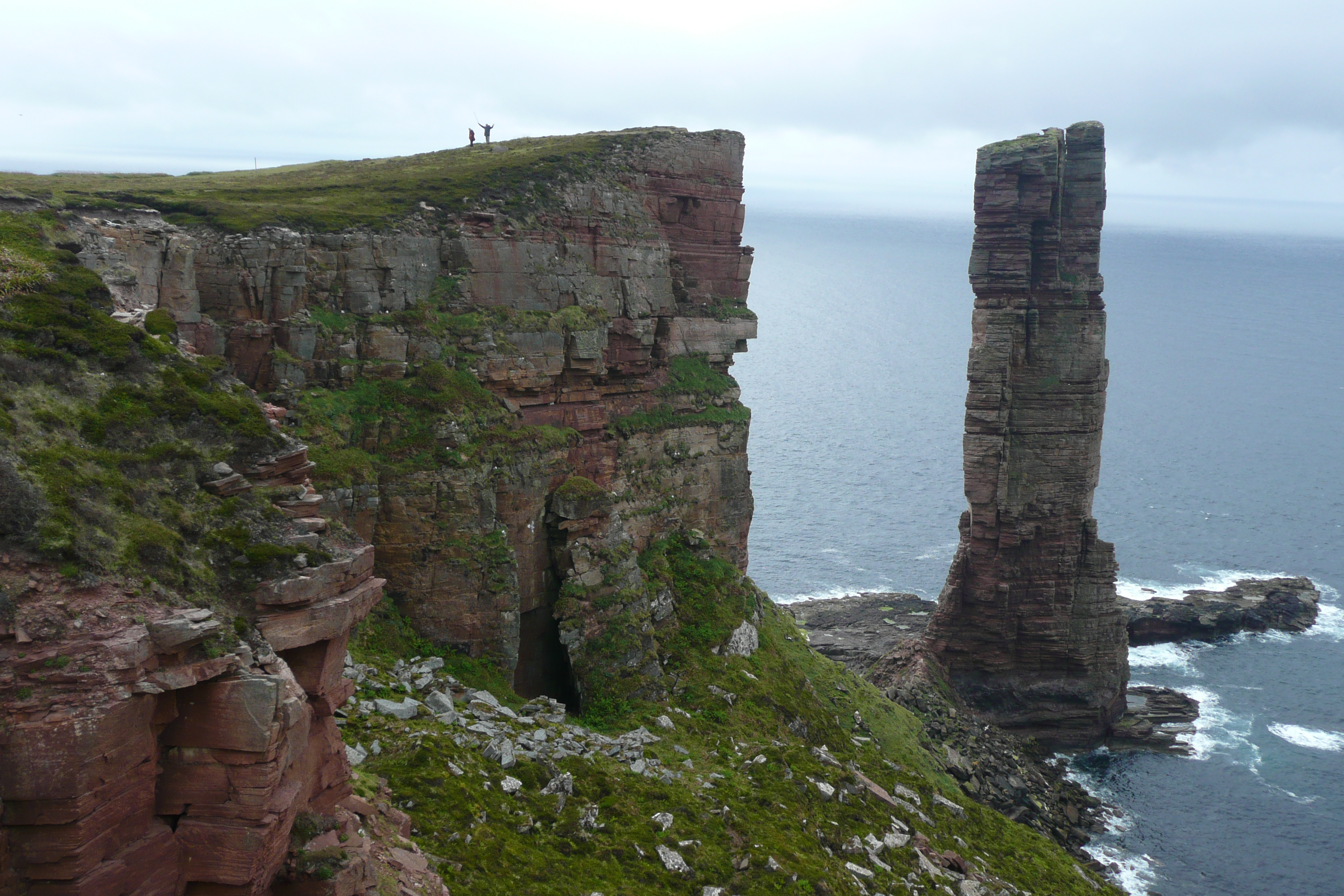
The Old Man of Hoy
