= Evelyn Chapman =

Australian painter (1888–1961)

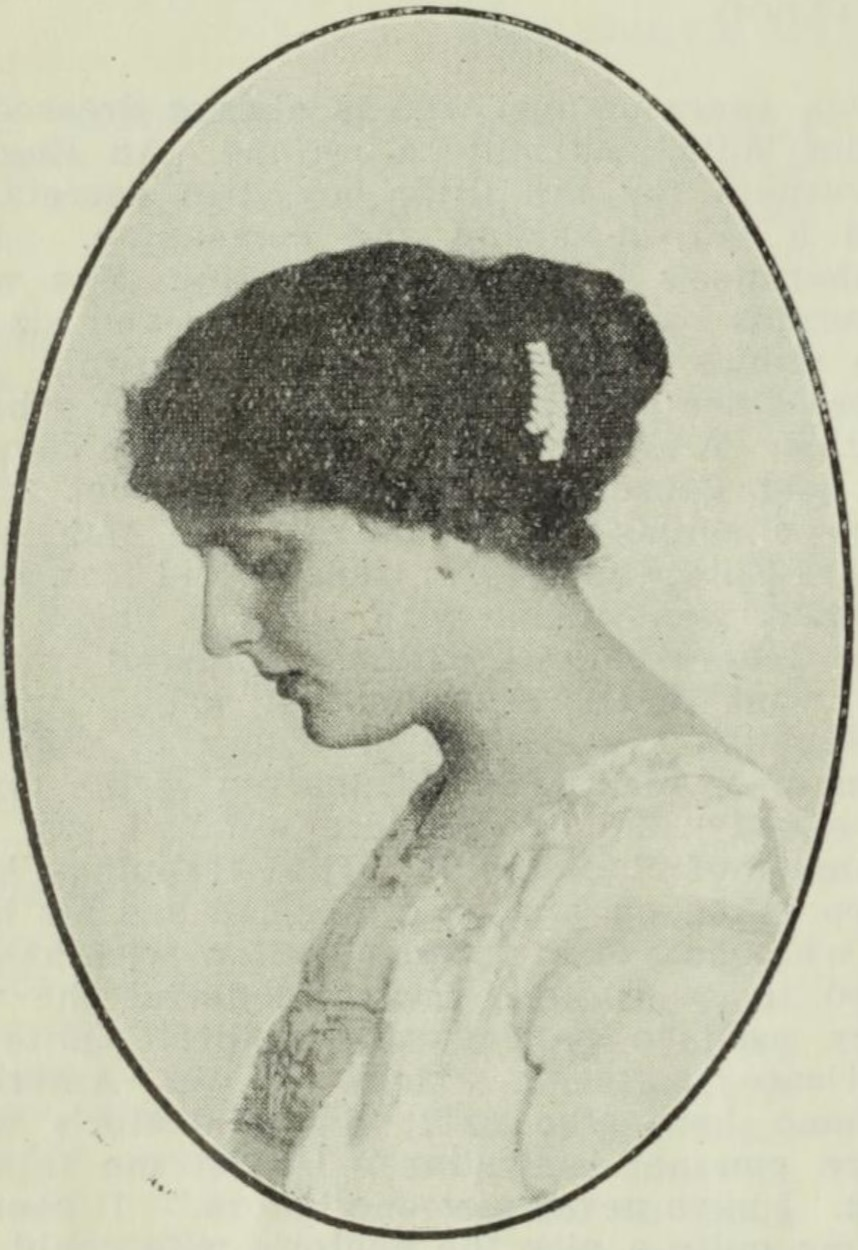
- Chapman in 1915
- Born: Grace Evelyn Chapman; 25 October 1888; Sydney, New South Wales, Australia
- Died: 18 July 1961 (aged 72); England
- Education: Royal Art Society School, Académie Julian, Bushey School of Art
- Occupation: Visual artist
- Known for: Portrait paintings
- Spouse: George Thalben-Ball

Grace Evelyn Chapman (1888–1961), known as Evelyn Chapman, was an Australian artist, known for her depictions of the battlefields of France. She was the first Australian woman artist to visit and paint those WWI scenes. She was also a portraitist.

== Life and work ==
Chapman was born in Sydney, Australia, on 25 October 1888, daughter of Grace Egerton (née Cornish) and Thomas John Francis Chapman, a merchant known as Frank. She was educated at Miss Hooper's Cambridge School in Hunters Hill.

In 1906 she began studying at the Royal Art Society School with Antonio Dattilo Rubbo. Her portrait of him, painted in 1911, was purchased by the Art Gallery of New South Wales in 1919. At the 1909 exhibition of students' work, Chapman won several prizes. The following two years her work was hung at the Royal Art Society's annual exhibition, including "Une Jeune Fille" in 1911 which was described as "a charming portrait...attractive, sympathetic, and arresting; the colour scheme is admirable, and the painting of the silk garment flung over the subject's shoulder is particularly good", Chapman said to be "a promising student...shortly, we understand, to study in Paris".

In France, she continued her art studies at the Académie Julian in Paris, under painter Lucien Simon from 1911 to 1913. She returned to Sydney in 1913 and exhibited paintings at the Royal Art Society annual exhibition the following year. Her work was said to be "much advanced by her studies in Paris" and "Blue and Gold" was purchased by the National Art Gallery.

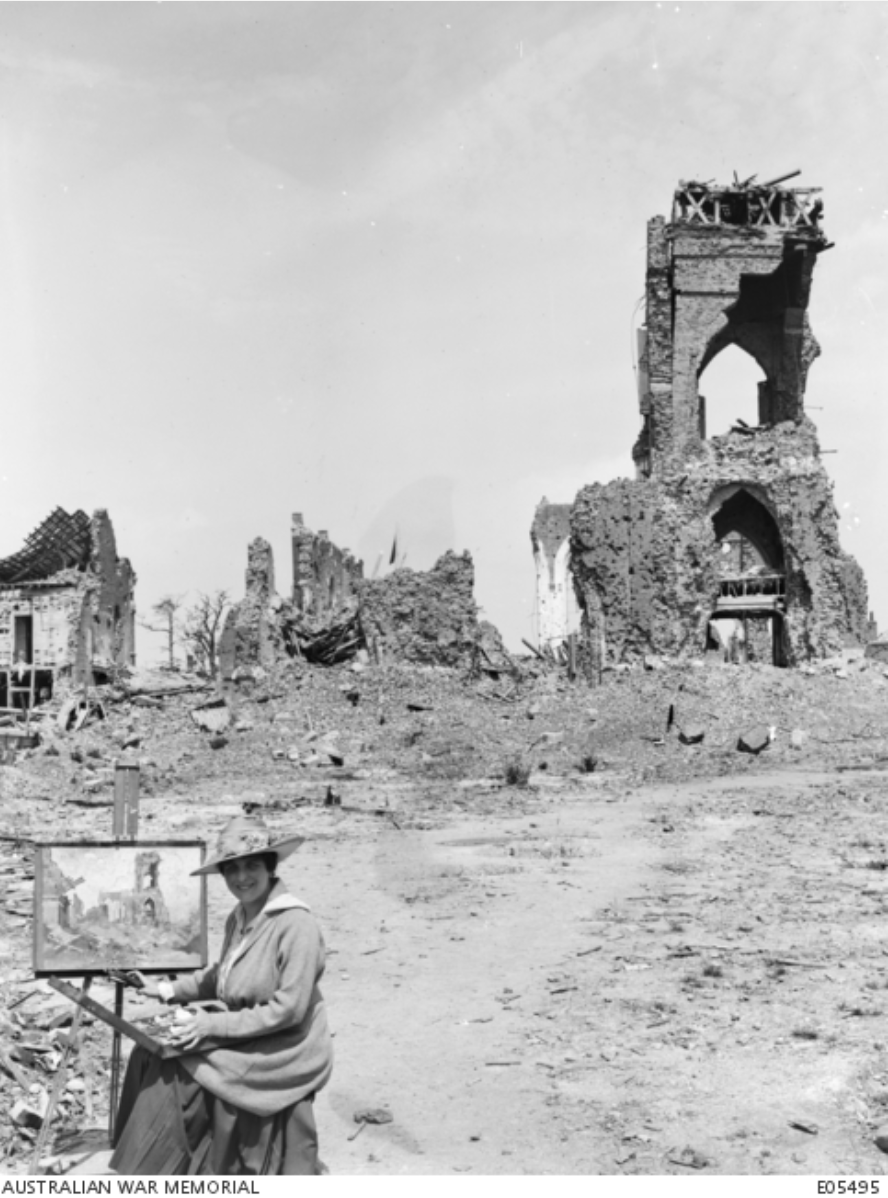
Chapman, 1919, near a Villers-Bretonneux church

During the war years, she lived in England where she studied with Lucy Kemp-Welch at the Bushey School of Art.

Chapman visited Villers-Bretonnneux in 1919 with her father, who was working with the New Zealand War Graves Commission. According to the Australian War Memorial she was "the only known Australian woman artist to have gained access to the Western Front in the immediate aftermath of the war". While there she painted a number of works, including seven which were acquired by the Australian War Memorial in 1977–78 and others held in the Art Gallery of New South Wales.

In 1920–1923, she had pictures accepted for exhibition at the Paris Salon. Her work was hung at the 1922 Exhibition of Women's Work at Olympia in London. Despite this recognition, she was not accepted for the Royal Academy in 1921 and chose not to submit further paintings.

Four of her paintings were included in an exhibition of works by Rupert Richardson and her daughter, Pamela Thalben-Ball, held in Canberra in 1979.

== Legacy ==
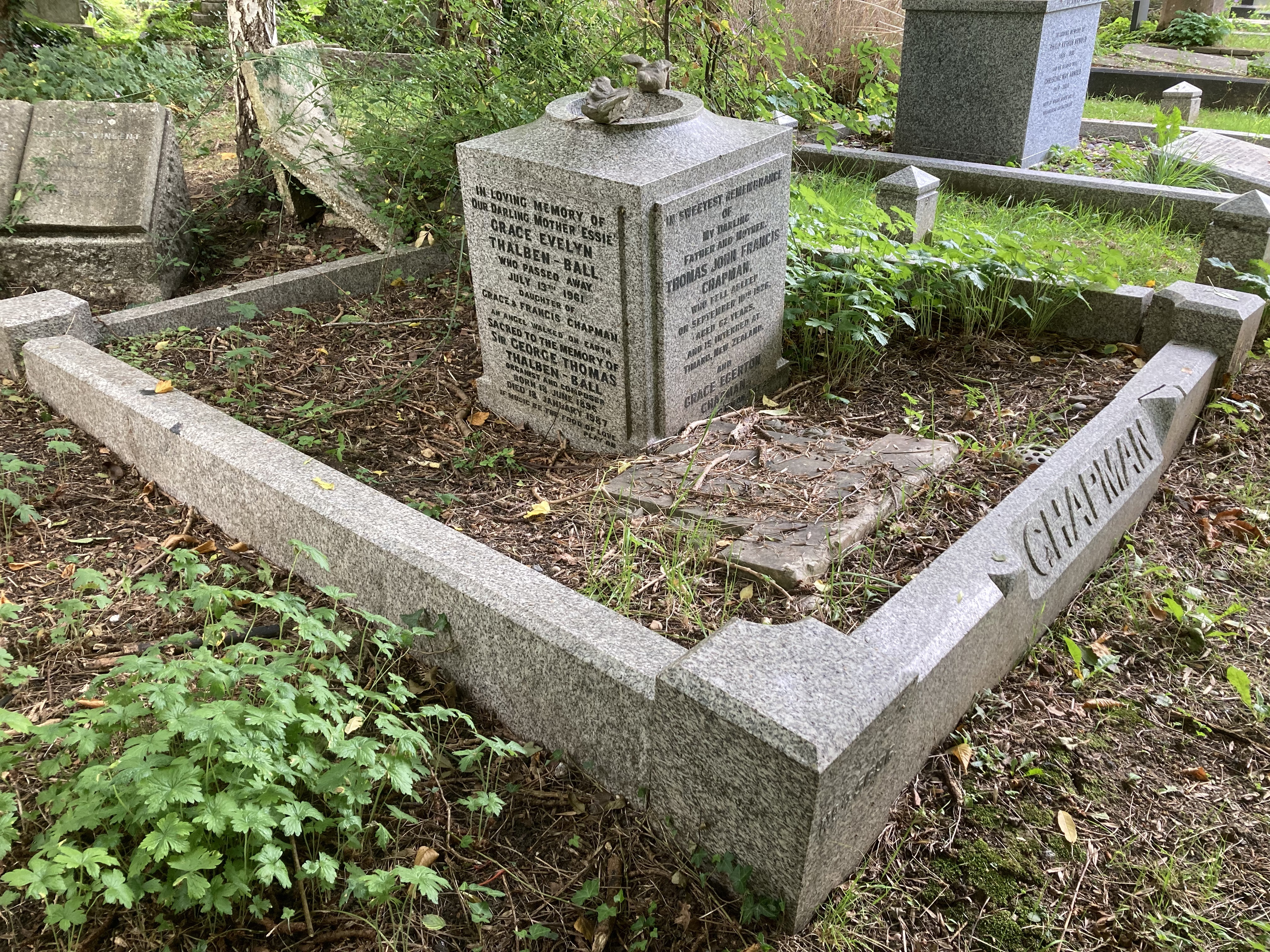
Grave of Evelyn and Sir George Thalben-Ball

Her daughter, Pamela Thalben-Ball, bequeathed funds for the Evelyn Chapman Art Award. The scholarship, administered by the S. H. Ervin Gallery, was first awarded in 2018. Recipients have been:

- 2018 – Kate Stevens
- 2020 – Caroline Zilinsky
- 2022 – Rachel Milne
- 2024 – Nicole Kelly

== Personal life and death ==
Chapman married the organist George Thalben-Ball in London in 1926 and gave up painting.

She lived in England for the rest of her life where she died on 18 July 1961 and was buried in Highgate Cemetery.
