= William Bartholomew (writer) =

William Bartholomew (1793–1867) was an English librettist, composer, and writer. He made his living as a chemist, but is best remembered as the translator/text author for the premieres of many of Felix Mendelssohn's works in England; most notably the anthem Hear My Prayer (1845) and the oratorio Elijah for its premiere at the Birmingham Triennial Music Festival in 1846. As a composer, he produced several hymns, The Nativity oratorio, and children's songs. He was married to the composer and organist Ann Mounsey. Son of Lemuel Bartholomew.
