= William Mounsey =

William Mounsey may refer to:

- William Mounsey (Royal Navy officer) (1766–1830), British Royal Navy captain
- William Mounsey (bishop) (1867–1952), Bishop of Labuan and Sarawak, 1909–1916
- William H. Mounsey (1808–1877), British soldier and antiquarian
