= Dwarfie Stane =

Carved Megalithic chambered tomb in Scotland

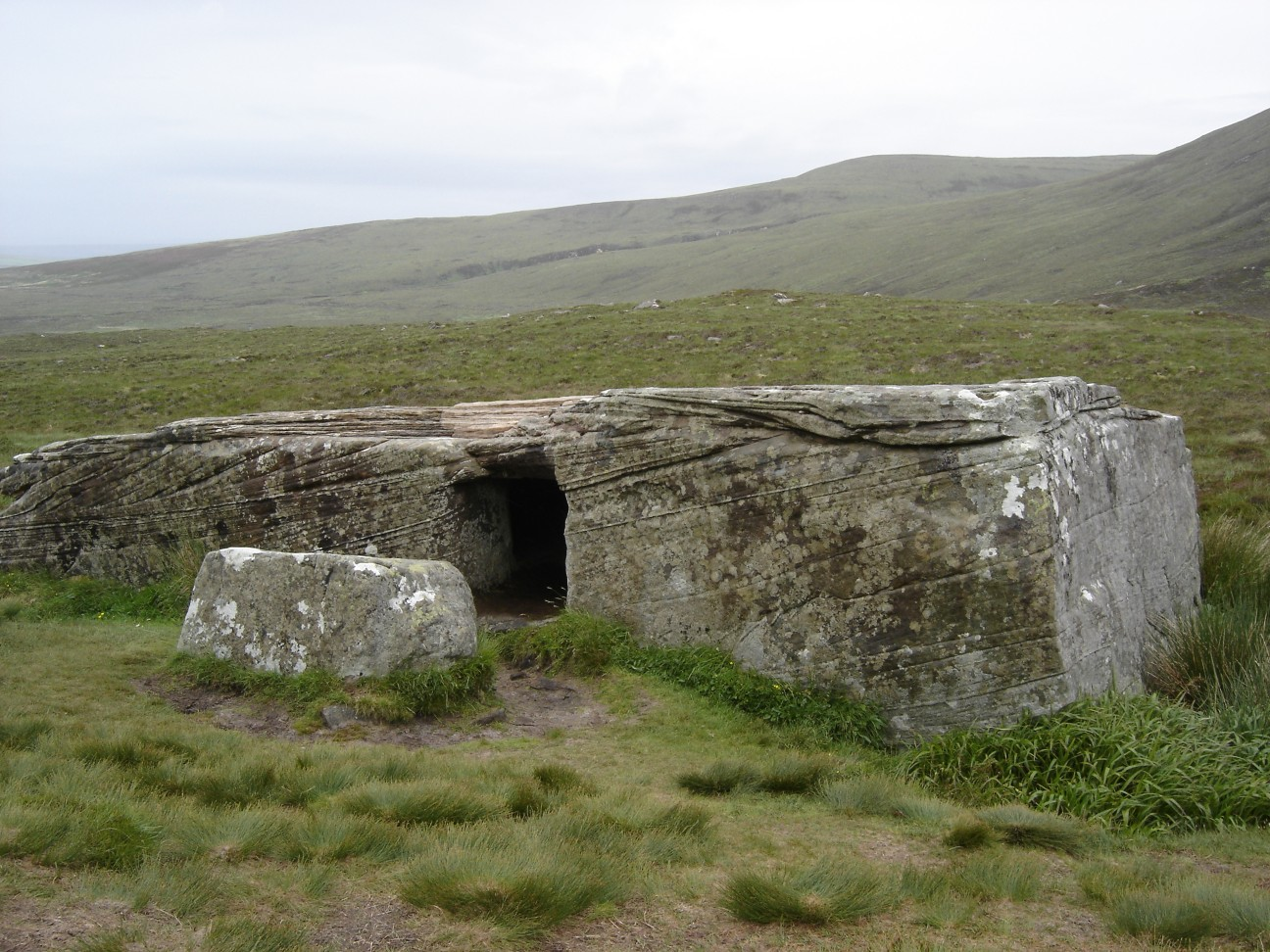
- The tomb in 2005
- Interactive map of Dwarfie Stane
- 58°53′04″N 3°18′51″W
- Type: Tomb
- Location: Scotland, United Kingdom

History
- Built: c. 3000 BC

Site notes
- Material: Old Red Sandstone
- Height: 2.5 m (8 ft 2 in)
- Length: 8.6 m (28 ft)
- Width: 4 m (13 ft)

The Dwarfie Stane is a megalithic chambered tomb carved out of a titanic block of Devonian Old Red Sandstone located in a steep-sided glaciated valley between the settlements of Quoys and Rackwick on Hoy, an island in Orkney, Scotland. The stone is a glacial erratic located in desolate peatland. The site is managed by Historic Environment Scotland.

== Description ==
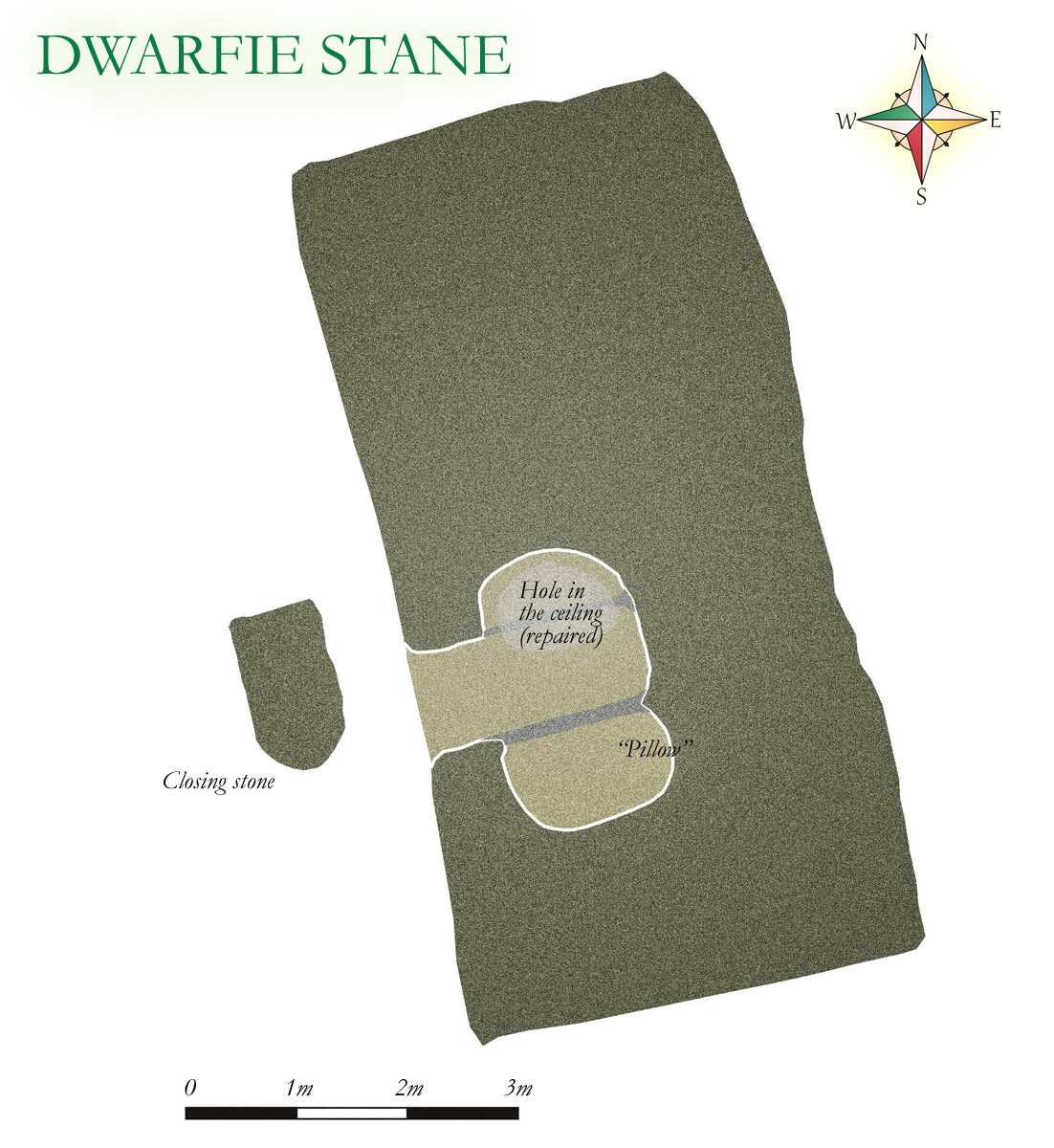
Plan of Dwarfie Stane

The attribution as a tomb was originally based on its resemblance to recognized tombs in southern Europe. The Dwarfie Stane is the only chambered tomb in Orkney that is cut from stone rather than built from stones and may be the only example of a Neolithic rock-cut tomb in Britain. However, despite its unique construction, its plan is consistent with the so-called Orkney-Cromarty class of chambered tomb found throughout Orkney. Some authors have referred to this type of tomb as Bookan-class, after a chambered cairn in Mainland, although there is some disagreement as to the relationship between the two tomb types.

A stone slab originally blocked the entrance to the tomb on its west side, but now lies on the ground in front of it. It is unique in northern Europe, bearing similarity to Neolithic or Bronze Age tombs around the Mediterranean. R. Castleden refers to the Dwarfie Stane as representing "the imported idea of the rock-cut tomb" that was "tried once and found to be unsatisfactory", perhaps due to the hardness, as it has been described as being built from "extremely compact" Old Red Sandstone by folklorist Hugh Miller who was also a stonemason by trade. There is no direct evidence, however, of any link to the builders of the Mediterranean rock-cut tombs.

The stone is 8.6 metres (28 ft) long, by 4 metres (13 ft) wide and up to 2.5 metres (8.2 ft) high. The entrance is a 1 metre (3.3 ft) square cut out of the west side of the rock. Inside the tomb is a passage 2.2 metres (7.2 ft) long and two side cells measuring 1.7 metres (5.6 ft) by 1 metre (3.3 ft). Both the passage and the side cells are 1 metre (3.3 ft) high. Right, southern cell has a "pillow" of uncut rock at its inner end.

== History ==
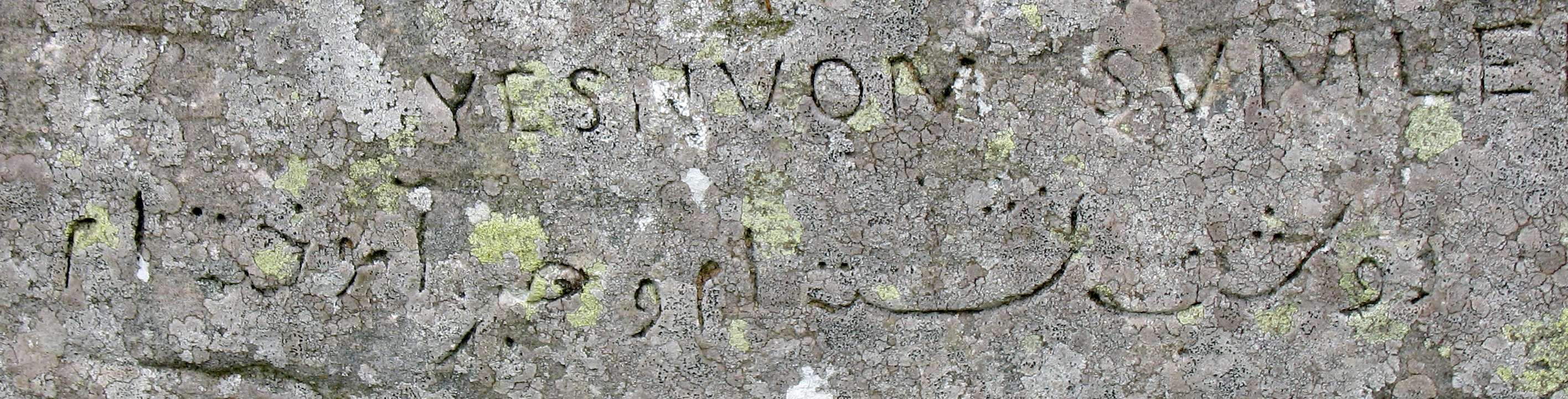
19th-century Persian inscription on the Dwarfie Stane

The tomb has been plundered by making an opening through the roof of the chamber. The time of this event is not known, but the hole in the roof had been noted by the 16th century. The hole was repaired with concrete in the 1950s or 1960s.

The name is derived from local legend that a dwarf named Trollid lived there, although, ironically, the tomb has also been claimed as the work of giants. Its existence was popularised in Walter Scott's novel The Pirate published in 1821.

There is a variety of 18th- and 19th-century graffiti on the rock-cut tomb. One is an inscription in Persian calligraphy that states "I have sat two nights and so learnt patience" left by Captain William Mounsey, who camped here in 1850. Above the Persian is Mounsey's name written backwards in Latin.

== See also ==
- Prehistoric Orkney
- Ring of Brodgar
- Standing Stones of Stenness
- Maeshowe
- World Heritage Sites in Scotland
- Timeline of prehistoric Scotland

== Bibliography ==
- Castleden, Rodney (1987). The Stonehenge People: An Exploration of Life in Neolithic Britain 4700-2000 BC. London: Routledge & Kegan Paul Ltd. ISBN 0-7102-0968-1.
- Childe, V. Gordon; Simpson, W. Douglas (1952). Illustrated History of Ancient Monuments: Vol. VI Scotland. Edinburgh: Her Majesty's Stationery Office.
- Hawkes, Jacquetta (1986). The Shell Guide to British Archaeology. London: Michael Joseph. ISBN 0-7181-2448-0.
- Hedges, John W. (1984). Tomb of the Eagles: Death and Life in a Stone Age Tribe. New York: New Amsterdam. ISBN 0-941533-05-0.
- Henshall, Audrey (1985). The Chambered Cairns, in: Renfrew, Colin (Ed.) The Prehistory of Orkney BC 4000-1000 AD. Edinburgh: Edinburgh University Press. ISBN 0-85224-456-8.
- Johnston, Alfred W. (1896), "The' Dwarfie Stone' of Hoy, Orkney", The Reliquary and Illustrated Archæologist, new series, 2: 84–101
- Laing, Lloyd (1974). Orkney and Shetland: An Archaeological Guide. Newton Abbott: David and Charles Ltd. ISBN 0-7153-6305-0.
- Ritchie, Anna (1995). Prehistoric Orkney. London: B.T. Batsford Ltd. ISBN 0-7134-7593-5.
