= Ernest Lough =

English singer (1911–2000)

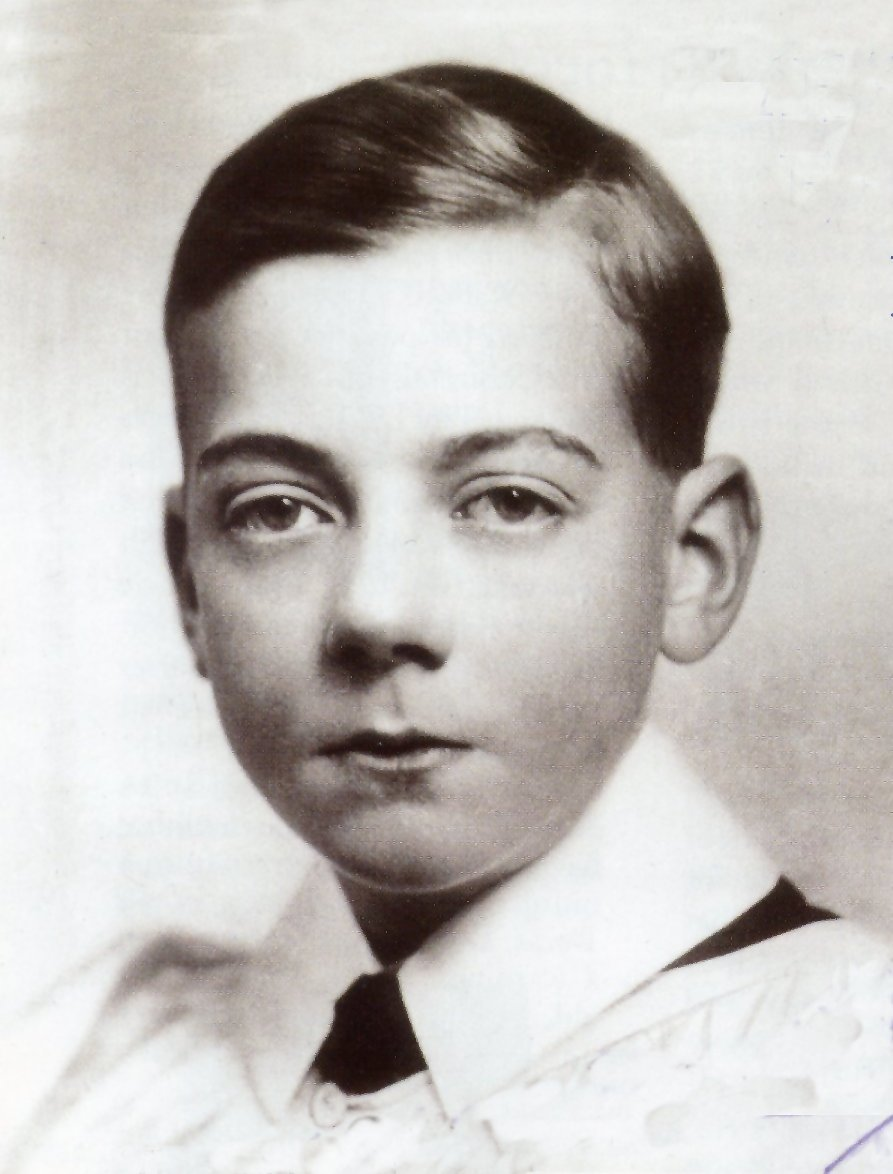
- Lough in 1927
- Born: 17 November 1911; Forest Gate, Essex, England
- Died: 22 February 2000 (aged 88); Watford, Hertfordshire, England
- Occupation: Boy soprano singer
- Years active: 1924–1939

Hear my prayer
1927 recording of Hear my prayer at Temple Church, London.

Ernest Arthur Lough (/lʌf/; 17 November 1911 – 22 February 2000) was an English singer who was the soloist in Felix Mendelssohn's "Hear my prayer", which includes the famous "O for the Wings of a Dove", for the Gramophone Company (later His Master's Voice and then EMI) in 1927. The record became His Master's Voice's biggest seller for 1927, and made the piece, the choir and the soloist world-famous. The original master recording wore out, and a second version had to be recorded to replace it in 1928. In 1962, it became EMI's first million-selling classical record, earning it "gold disc" status.

== Early life ==
Lough was born in Forest Gate, County Borough of West Ham, Essex, England. His father worked for an insurance company. He was a treble in the local church choir, at St Peter's, Forest Gate. He auditioned at Southwark Cathedral, but joined the choir of the Temple Church in London in 1924, which was under the direction of organist and choirmaster George Thalben-Ball, who had just succeeded Sir Walford Davies. As a chorister of the Temple Church, Lough had a choral scholarship to the nearby City of London School.

== Recording ==
Lord Justice Eldon Bankes suggested that the Temple choir should make a record; on 15 March 1927, the Gramophone Company brought its new mobile recording unit to the Temple Church where the choir recorded Felix Mendelssohn's "Hear my prayer". Lough, then aged 15, sang the famous solo "O for the Wings of a Dove". It is said that he had to stand on two large books to be near enough to the microphone. The recording sold over one million copies by 1962, and was awarded a gold disc by the RIAA.

His Master's Voice issued its record, C1329, in June 1927. It was an instant hit and became His Master's Voice's biggest seller for 1927. It made the piece, the choir and the soloist world-famous. Crowds of people packed the congregation to hear Lough sing at Sunday services, and his singing on the recording was considered so beautiful that a legend grew up that he had died after singing the last note. The original master recording wore out, and a second version had to be recorded to replace it in 1928.

This recording continued to sell throughout the twentieth century. In January 1963, it earned a gold disc specifically to mark the 35th anniversary of the recording and the completion of over 35 years of co-operation between the Temple Church and His Master's Voice. It is known that it did sell over a million copies, but the number was not exactly recorded. It is still available on CD, and has now sold over six million copies. It was described in The Record Guide (1951) as "one of the outstanding best-sellers of gramophone history".

Ernest Lough's voice broke in 1929, after he had made a number of other recordings, although none of them achieved the iconic status of "O for the Wings of a Dove". He continued to sing in his spare time as a baritone, and was one of the "gentlemen" or adult members of the Temple choir.

== Later life ==
After he left school, Lough approached the management of His Master's Voice and reminded them that he had made a great deal of money for them, and felt it was fair to ask for a favour in return. His Master's Voice gave him a position in their advertising department, where he met Ethel Winnifred Charlton. They were married in June 1938, and had three sons. Two became choristers at the Temple Church, and one at the Chapel Royal. HMV also made several recordings of Lough as a baritone, but he did not pursue a career in this field.

Lough served in the fire service during the Second World War, and was present when the Temple Church burned down in 1942. He appeared as a fire-control operator in a wartime propaganda film about the fire service in London, entitled Fires Were Started, which was filmed using actual firefighters rather than professional actors.

After the war, he worked at the advertising agency Mather and Crowther (later Ogilvy and Mather).

He was a member for many years of the Bach Choir, singing 1st bass, together with his son Graham.

He died at Watford General Hospital, Hertfordshire, England, aged 88, survived by his wife and three sons. His obituary appeared in The Times and The Guardian on 24 February 2000, and there is a commemorative plaque to him in the Temple Church.

== Other sources ==
- Elizabeth Forbes, "Lough, Ernest Arthur (1911–2000)", Oxford Dictionary of National Biography, Oxford University Press, 2004; online edn, May 2010 accessed 17 November 2011
- Obituary, The Guardian, 24 February 2000
- Obituary, The New York Times, 6 March 2000
- Record sleeve LP of: The Ernest Lough Album, "My Life in Music". Ernest Lough and the Choir of the Temple Church, London. Organist and Director of Choir Dr. George Thalben-Ball. EMI Records Limited, Hayes, Middlesex, England.
