= William H. Mounsey =

British antiquarian and soldier

William Henry Mounsey
- Born: before 25 January 1808; Carlisle, England
- Died: 3 December 1877 (aged 69); Carlisle
- Military career
- Allegiance: British
- Branch: Infantry
- Service years: 1829–1844
- Rank: Captain
- Units: 15th Foot, 4th Foot

William Henry Mounsey (1808 – 3 December 1877) was a British army officer and antiquarian with an interest in Iran and Jewish culture. He visited Egypt, the Middle East and other regions.

== Early life ==
William Mounsey was christened on 25 January 1808 at St Cuthbert's Church in Carlisle, Cumberland. His father Robert Mounsey was a solicitor. The family home, Rockcliffe Manor, was at Rockcliffe, north-west of Carlisle.

== Army career ==
Mounsey was intended to be a solicitor, like his father, but first had a military career. He purchased a commission as an ensign in the 15th Foot on 28 May 1829. He was promoted to lieutenant on 4 January 1833 and to captain on 14 April 1837. In 1838 he transferred to the 4th Foot and retired from the army in 1844. (Note: According to the Mounsey family he was promoted to major and others have copied that, but it is in contradiction with the text in Plan of Barracks and Accommodation at Secunderabad, India, 1843 and text in the Morning Post (7 December 1877), where Mounsey is mentioned as captain. So he was called captain shortly before his retirement (1844) and immediately after his death (1877).) He sold his captaincy, returned to England and took over the family business as solicitor, possibly after his father's death.

== Antiquarian ==
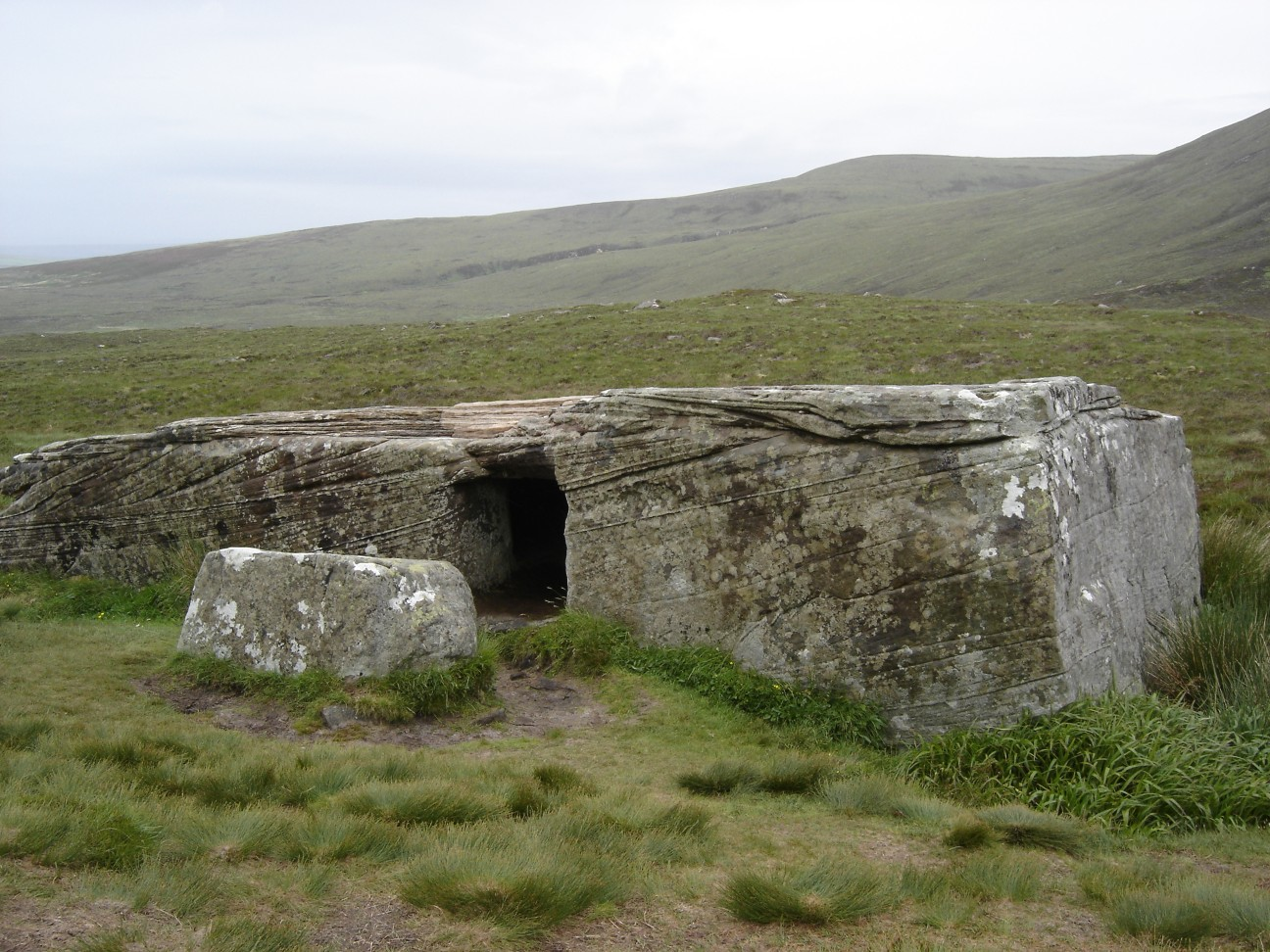
The Dwarfie Stane, Island of Hoy, Orkney

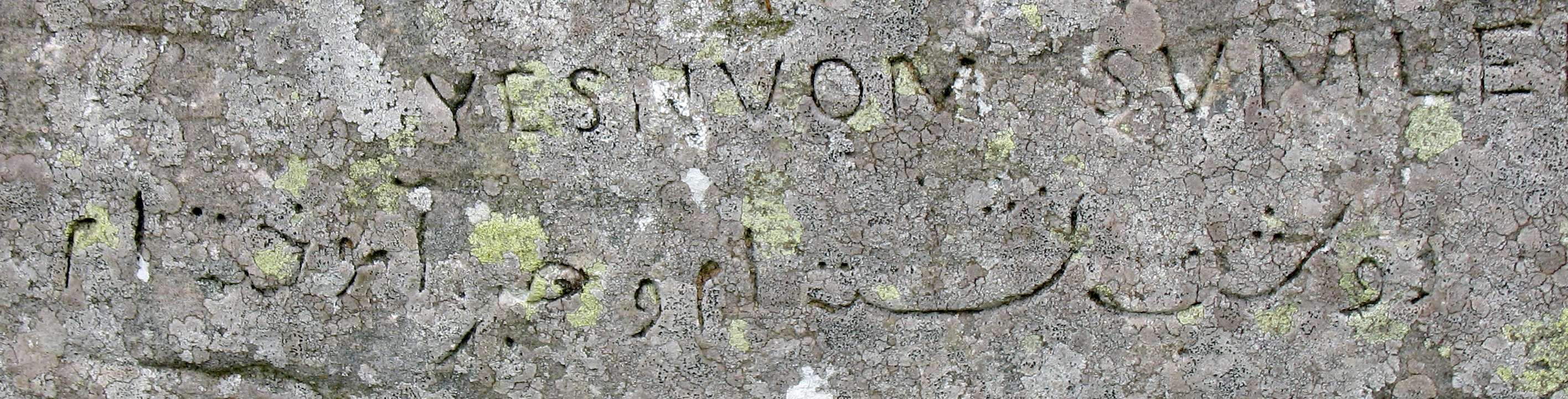
Mounsey's inscription on the Dwarfie Stane

Circa 1850 he became an amateur archaeologist. In his civilian life he was a solicitor. He spoke fluently Greek, Latin, Persian, Welsh and of course English. According to the 1851 census, he was living in Castle Street, Carlisle with his sisters Margaret, Mary and Ann, and was the holder of property chiefly vested in landed security. After his retirement he wandered in the UK dressed in a Jewish outfit and was known as the "Jew of Carlisle". During military service in the Middle East he had become fascinated by Jewish culture. Mounsey himself designed his priestly costume and had a long beard. It has been claimed that he worked as a spy in Persia and Afghanistan and this is how he mastered the Persian language. (Note: Important is the article in the Archaeological Notes HY20SW 8 2430 0043 where the spy story is mentioned.)

He is known for a carved inscription he left on the Dwarfie Stane, a Neolithic rock-cut tomb in an erratic block on the island of Hoy in Orkney. Mounsey camped here in 1850 and inscribed in Persian script in the sandstone: "I have sat two nights and so learnt patience", this is taken to be a reference to the Highland midge. Above the Persian is his own name written backwards in Latin script as 'YESNUOM SUMLEILUG'. There is an information sign with remarks about the Persian inscription and Mounsey; his surname is wrongly spelled 'Mouncey'. To the right of the Persian text is another one, possibly with the same quotation, but largely obliterated. The combination of the Persian text (right to left) and his own name written in the same way is striking.

He also left his mark on ancient sites in Cumberland. In 1850 he traced the course of the River Eden from the Solway Firth to its source in Mallerstang and set up a monument to mark the source of the river. It was an inscribed Dent Marble pillar with Hebrew, Greek and Latin elements. The Star of David was depicted. The pillar was smashed in 1870 by railway workers. In Outhgill (Cumbria) there is a replica made of limestone, called the "Jew Stone", placed in 1989 after the visit of a Jewish traveller, named Shalom Hermon, who saw the broken original in 1984. The Latin inscription translated reads: "William Mounsey, a lone traveller, commenced his journey at the mouth and finished at the source, fulfilled his vow to the genius and nymphs of the Eden on 15 March 1850".

He carved a 9th-century Welsh verse on the walls of a pre-Roman archaeological site in 1852 and left other inscriptions near the river Eden. Letters carved in reverse are typical for Mounsey.

Probably, he was the sculptor of a series of five enigmatic faces cut into the sandstone cliffs of Eden gorge near Armathwaite. Possibly the faces were a kind of self-portrait. There is a similarity between the faces, especially between the nicely worked out ones with moustache. The heads are middle-aged, like Mounsey at that time. Supposing that inscription and faces are contemporary and both done by Mounsey in 1855. This is certainly a possibility or more, considering the already mentioned arguments, pointing to his eccentricity with his urge to leave his mark during his wanderings. The inscriptions on Hoy (with his name and 1850) and near the river Eden (with 1855) are in the same bold style, have curious texts and are from the same period. The inscription near the river Eden consists of a quotation from Isaac Walton's Compleat Angler. So the nearby carved salmon could be done by Mounsey too. The carving of the heads by him is at least plausible. There are five heads, between them is a carved salmon and above them are some lines of poetry. All in soft sandstone and presumably done by Mounsey. In the book The Eden Way (Charlie Emett; 1990) two of the carved heads are depicted with the text: "Rock carvings by William Mounsey" but this is contrary to text elsewhere in the book; for instance: "The faces do not appear to carry the Mounsey stamp". There is a Stuart fireplace overmantel with similar faces, in the possession of Peter Ecroyd, who owns the part of the river near the faces (1990). He believes that the carved heads are older and not carved by Mounsey. But an older fireplace overmantel does not mean that the carving is earlier, because it could be done later. A carved head close to the end of Mounsey's inscription near the date is a striking fact.

He was fascinated by a maze or labyrinth near the boathouse in Rockcliffe marsh. It was one of a number that have been cut on the marsh in the peat at different times. He believed these to represent Caerdroia, or the Walls of Troy, and to be restricted to land occupied by Celtic people. In 1858 Mounsey drew attention to the description in a Welsh book Drych y Prif Oesoedd (Mirror of the Early Centuries) by Theophilus Evans (1716) of a custom formerly prevalent among Welsh shepherds of cutting in the turf a figure in the form of a labyrinth, a turf maze, which they called Caerdroia.

His study Tales – The Children of Lir and Cath Cluana Tairbh, (1859), and his Welsh version of Purgatorium S. Patricii, c.1860, are held in the National Library of Wales in Aberystwyth. These are examples of his fascination for the Celts, but he was also interested in other cultures. Three books, one about Spinoza (Exposition des sentiments de Spinosa) and another about Persia (Curiositez inovyes) and one about ancient grammar (Institutiones grammaticae Anglo-Saxonicae et Moeso-Gothicae), are now in the Dutch Royal Library and Open Library and State Library of New South Wales with 'W. H. Mounsey' stamped in them.

He lived for some time with his brother George Gill Mounsey at Castletown House near Carlisle. Their father, Robert Mounsey, had bought the Castletown estate at Rockcliffe in 1802. William Mounsey died on 3 December 1877 at Rockcliffe Hall, near Carlisle. He did not marry.

== Bibliography ==
- Tales – The Children of Lir and Cath Cluana Tairbh (1859)
- Welsh version of Purgatorium S. Patricii (c.1860)

Editions with work of Mounsey (National Library of Wales)

- Papers of Evan Davies ('Ieuan Myfyr') (1829)
- Gwaith Ieuan Brydydd Hir-I (1853)
- Barddoniaeth (1859)
- Testunau Cymraeg, etc. (1859)
- Testunau Cymraeg yn llaw (1860)
- Gwaith Ieuan Brydydd Hir-II (1861)
- Letters from members of the Mounsey family (1862-1891)
- Gwaith William Llŷn (1867)
- Testunau Cymraeg yn llaw (1867)
- Gweithiau Iolo Goch gyda nodiadau hanesyddol a beirniadol (1896) [Wiliam Henry Mounsey, 1859]

== Castletown House ==
The Grade II* listed Castletown House, where Mounsey lived around 1870, is still owned by the Mounsey-Heysham family. William Mounsey's father bought Rockcliffe manor and built a large villa, Castletown (completed in 1811) by Peter Nicholson and William Reid. According to Historic Houses, Castles and Gardens, it was built in 1809 by architect Peter Nicholson.
