= Hear my prayer =

1844 motet by Felix Mendelssohn

- Motet by Felix Mendelssohn
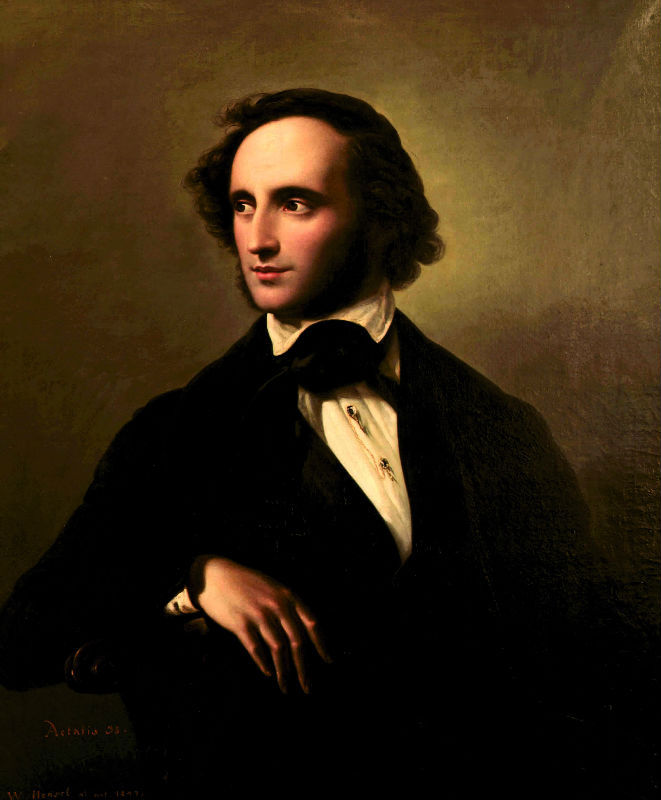
- Portrait of Mendelssohn by Wilhelm Hensel, 1847
- Other name: Hör' mein Bitten
- Key: G major
- Catalogue: WoO 15
- Text: from Psalm 55
- Language: English
- Performed: 8 January 1845: London
- Scoring: soprano; SATB choir; organ

Hear my prayer
1927 recording by Ernest Lough at Temple Church, London.

"Hear my prayer" (German: Hör mein Bitten) is an anthem for soprano solo, chorus (SATB) and organ or orchestra composed by Felix Mendelssohn in Germany in 1844. The first performance took place in Crosby Hall, London, on 8 January 1845. (The organ is now at St Ann's Church, Tottenham.) The accompanist on that occasion was organist, composer and teacher Ann Mounsey (1811–1891). She later married the librettist of the work, William Bartholomew (1793–1867), who also collaborated with Mendelssohn on his oratorio Elijah (German: Elias). The anthem is particularly well known through the recording made in 1927 by treble Ernest Lough.

The text (derived from Psalm 55):

Hear my prayer, O God, incline Thine ear!
Thyself from my petition do not hide.
Take heed to me! Hear how in prayer I mourn to Thee,
Without Thee all is dark, I have no guide.

The enemy shouteth, the godless come fast!
Iniquity, hatred, upon me they cast!
The wicked oppress me, Ah where shall I fly?
Perplexed and bewildered, O God, hear my cry!

My heart is sorely pained within my breast,
my soul with deathly terror is oppressed,
trembling and fearfulness upon me fall,
with horror overwhelmed, Lord, hear me call!

O for the wings, for the wings of a dove!
Far away, far away would I rove!
In the wilderness build me a nest,
and remain there for ever at rest.

Hör' mein Bitten, Herr, neige dich zu mir,
auf deines Kindes Stimme habe Acht!
Ich bin allein; wer wird mein Tröster und Helfer sein?
Ich irre ohne Pfad in dunkler Nacht!

Die Feinde sie droh'n und heben ihr Haupt:
"Wo ist nun der Retter, an den ihr geglaubt?"
Sie lästern dich täglich, sie stellen uns nach
und halten die Frommen in Knechtschaft und Schmach.

Mich fasst des Todes Furcht bei ihrem Dräu'n.
Sie sind unzählige – ich bin allein;
mit meiner Kraft kann ich nicht widersteh'n;
Herr, kämpfe du für mich. Gott, hör' mein Fleh'n!

O könnt' ich fliegen wie Tauben dahin,
weit hinweg vor dem Feinde zu flieh'n!
in die Wüste eilt' ich dann fort,
fände Ruhe am schattigen Ort.
