= Elizabeth Mounsey =

British organist, guitarist, and composer

- Born: 8 October 1819; London
- Died: 3 October 1905 (aged 85)

Elizabeth Mounsey (8 October 1819 – 3 October 1905) was a British organist, guitarist, and composer. She became the organist of St Peter upon Cornhill Church in London when she was 14 years old and remained in the post until 1882. Mounsey also composed works with her sister Ann Mounsey and Elizabeth had a short career as a guitarist.

== Life ==
She was born on 8 October 1819 at Old Compton Street in London. Her parents were Mary and Thomas Mounsey and he was a licensed victualler. Elizabeth is buried in the Abney Park cemetery.

== Professional career ==
After the death of the prior organist of St Peter upon Cornhill, William Adams, Mounsey competed for the position at 14 years old. The voting was by the vestry and the parish with Mounsey receiving 36 votes from the vestry and 52 votes from the parish. Before the competition, she had nine testimonials, with the oldest one dated 30 May 1834. A performance was later held by Mounsey and organist Henry Gauntlett in 1840. In the autumn of 1840, Gauntlett invited German composer Felix Mendelssohn to St Peter to play the organ, where Mendelssohn played a Johann Sebastian Bach composition and two of his own. During the performance, Mounsey and Gauntlett stood on each side of the organist. When Mendelssohn asked Mounsey to perform for him, she declined and asked for his autograph. Mendelssohn presented Mounsey with the opening bars of Bach's passacaglia which was then preserved in the vestry of the church. She resigned from the position in 1882 from deafness.

Other than her work with the church, Mounsey also composed works for organ, piano, guitar, and hymns with her sister as well as playing the guitar. She was the pupil of German guitarist Ferdinand Pelzer and made her first performance on the guitar on 11 April 1833 at London Tavern. Her career as a guitarist was, however, only brief, but she published some of her compositions in the "Giulianiad" journal. In 1842, she was elected to the Royal Philharmonic Society.

Her works include Songs of Remembrance for voice and piano (London : T.E. Purday, [1837])
