= Ann Mounsey =

British teacher, conductor, and organist (1811–1891)

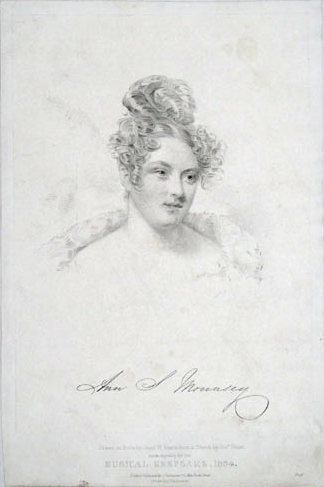
Ann S. Mounsey

Ann Mounsey or Ann Sheppard Mounsey or (after her marriage) Ann Mounsey Bartholomew was born on 17 April 1811 and died on 24 June 1891. She was well known in London as a teacher, conductor, and organist. As a composer, she published songs, hymns, partsongs, large-scale choral works, and many pieces for the piano and the organ.

== Life ==
Mounsey was born at 21 Old Compton Street, Soho, London, the eldest child of Thomas Mounsey, a licensed victualler, and his wife, Mary, née Briggs. Her younger sister, Elizabeth Mounsey (1819–1905) also became a professional musician. In 1824 the family settled in Shoreditch, London.

Mounsey's early music education was undertaken at the renowned piano academy of Johann Bernhard Logier where in 1820 her talent for composition was noted by the composer Louis Spohr during a visit there. Mounsey also received private organ lessons from the conductor and concert organist Samuel Wesley and from Thomas Attwood, the organist at St Paul's Cathedral London.

On 28 April 1853, Mounsey married the violinist and writer William Bartholomew (1793–1867). At the time of her death Mounsey Bartholomew was living at 58 Brunswick Place, City Road, Shoreditch, having suffered from several years of ill health, and being cared for by her sister Elizabeth.

== Career ==
=== Accompanist ===
Mounsey regularly appeared as an accompanist, most memorably was in 1845 when she performed as accompanist at Crosby Hall, London, for the premiere of the choral work "Hear my prayer" (for soprano solo, chorus and organ) by Felix Mendelssohn.

=== Conductor ===
From 1843 to 1848 Mounsey ran the Crosby Hall Sacred Concert an innovative public concert series of six concerts per season. Composers featured included Henry Purcell, Johann Sebastian Bach, Carl Heinrich Graun, Johann Georg Albrechtsberger, Luigi Cherubini, Joseph Haydn, Felix Mendelssohn and Mounsey herself. These concerts were very well received.

The establishment of these entertainments, having for their object the promulgation of the highest order of musical compositions in a part of the metropolis to which hitherto they have had no access, is deserving of great praise. Much pain is also expended in the performance of works of the great masters, the principal vocalists in London being invariably engaged and adequately cared for with the rehearsals. (The Musical Times, 1 January / 1 February 1847, p. 69)

=== Organist ===
The mainstay of Mounsey's musical life was as a church organist. In 1828, aged 17, she got her first job as a church organist in the London suburb of Clapton, transferred to St. Michael's Church, Wood Street, in 1829, and finally became the organist at St. Vedast's Church in Foster Lane. She served in this position for almost 50 years, until her retirement in 1883.

=== Honours ===
She was elected an associate of the London Philharmonic Society in 1834 and in 1839, she became a member of the Royal Society of Musicians. In 1840 she was a founder member of the Society of Female Musicians.

== Works ==
Mounsey's extensive catalogue comprises an oratorio (including The Nativity, Op. 29, of 1855), cantatas and odes, part songs, liturgical works, and around 120 songs for solo voice and piano, numerous compositions for piano solo, works for piano with various other solo instruments, and works for organ.
