= List of peaks in the Yorkshire Dales =

This is a list of the peaks in the Yorkshire Dales. To avoid the list becoming infinitely long and arbitrary, only hills with more than 30 m relative height are included. This includes all Marilyns and Hewitts as well as many other hills. (Marilyns are peaks in the British Isles with 150 metres (490 ft) of relative height; Hewitts are peaks in England, Ireland and Wales over 610 metres (2,000 ft) elevation, with at least 30 metres (98 ft) relative height. There are 22 Marilyns and 28 Hewitts in the Yorkshire Dales National Park.)

== Sorted by region ==
Topographically, the boundaries of the Yorkshire Dales trace the flow of streams from the lowest points between it and the neighbouring regions of the Lake District, North Pennines, Forest of Bowland, South Pennines and North York Moors.

Hills are grouped as topographically as possible, according to their 'parent Marilyn'. The parent Marilyn of hill A can be found by dividing the nearby area into territories, by tracing the runoff from the key col of each Marilyn. The parent is the Marilyn whose territory hill A resides in. Marilyns are given in bold, followed by the hills within their territories, which are delineated in the map.

In the table headers, H stands for height and RH for relative height.

=== Northern Dales ===
==== Howgills ====
ID	Hill	H	RH	Grid ref.
TCF-1	**The Calf**	676	383	SD667970
TCF-2	Calders	674	33	SD670960
TCF-3	Fell Head	640	c 86	SD649981
TCF-4	Arant Haw	605	57	SD662946
TCF-5	Simon's Seat	587	c 82	NY660000
TCF-6	Hazelgill Knott	578	42	SD673997
TCF-7	West Fell	542	c 47	NY670015
TCF-8	Uldale Head	532	c 129	NY641000
TCF-9	Hand Lake	500	c 42	NY647006
TCF-10	Linghaw	500	c 36	SD637985
TCF-11	Langdale Knott	477	c 36	NY660020
TCF-12	Blease Fell	474	c 57	NY624004
TCF-13	Winder	473	c 30	SD654932
TCF-14	Brown Moor	412	c 36	SD644969

ID	Hill	H	RH	Grid ref.
YSD-1	**Yarlside**	639	208	SD685985
YSD-2	Randygill Top	624	131	NY687000
YSD-3	Green Bell	605	48	NY699011
YSD-4	Hooksey	586	c 71	NY685009
YSD-5	Kensgriff	574	c 66	SD688993
YSD-6	Harter Fell	521	c 119	NY721002
YSD-7	Wandale Hill	497	c 111	SD705990

==== West of Mallerstang ====
ID	Hill	H	RH	Grid ref.
WBF-1	**Wild Boar Fell**	708	c 344	SD758988
WBF-2	Swarth Fell	681	c 76	SD755966
WBF-3	Little Fell	559	c 30	NY767008
WBF-4	Ash Fell	385	c 77	NY749040
WBF-5	Birkett Common	352	c 31	NY774036

ID	Hill	H	RH	Grid ref.
BAF-1	**Baugh Fell**	678	265	SD740916
BAF-2	Bluecaster	345	c 41	SD711969

==== Stainmore Gap to Swaledale ====
ID	Hill	H	RH	Grid ref.
RGS-1	**Rogan's Seat**	672	c 195	NY919030
RGS-2	Great Pinseat	583	49	NY970027
RGS-3	Calver Hill	487	c 90	NZ013003

ID	Hill	H	RH	Grid ref.
NSR-1	**Nine Standards Rigg**	662	157	NY825061
NSR-2	High Greygrits	522	c 40	NY877089
NSR-3	Moudy Mea	521	c 38	NY871117
NSR-4	Long Rigg	413	c 37	NY803089
NSR-5	Birkett Hill	405	c 31	NY801077
NSR-6	Birkett Hill	383	c 34	NY793069
NSR-7	High Out Wood	352	c 36	NY794076

ID	Hill	H	RH	Grid ref.
HVE-1	**Hoove**	553	179	NZ003071
HVE-2	Fremington Edge	475	c 35	NZ033018
HVE-3	Gayles Moor	396	c 39	NZ094053
HVE-4	Weather Hill	392	c 35	NZ086061
HVE-5	Forty Acres	368	c 50	NZ077004
HVE-6	Hutton's Monument	303	c 35	SE098996
HVE-7	Diddersley Hill	209	c 73	NZ174078

==== Swaledale to Wensleydale ====
ID	Hill	H	RH	Grid ref.
GSF-1	**Great Shunner Fell**	716	c 297	SD848972
GSF-2	High Seat	709	112	NY802012
GSF-3	Little Fell	667	c 49	SD808971
GSF-4	Tailbridge Hill	547	c 43	NY803054

ID	Hill	H	RH	Grid ref.
LLS-1	**Lovely Seat**	675	c 150	SD879950
LLS-2	Oxnop Common	584	c 33	SD924947
LLS-3	Pickerstone Ridge	565	c 80	SD995946
LLS-4	Tarn Seat	551	c 57	SD956943
LLS-5	Whit Fell	411	38	SE086946
LLS-6	Barden Fell	316	c 78	SE138967
LLS-7	Buck Bank	c 191	c 52	SE161891
LLS-8	Pillmore Hill	73	c 39	SE348724

ID	Hill	H	RH	Grid ref.
KSD-1	**Kisdon**	499	184	SD899998

=== Southern Dales ===
==== West / south-west ====
ID	Hill	H	RH	Grid ref.
CTP-1	**Calf Top**	609	312	SD664856
CTP-2	Castle Knott	538	55	SD656842
CTP-3	Holme Knott	370	c 34	SD651893

ID	Hill	H	RH	Grid ref.
GCM-1	**Great Coum**	687	c 221	SD701835
GCM-2	Gragareth	627	30	SD687793
GCM-3	Barbon Low Fell	437	c 132	SD651809
GCM-4	Hoggs Hill	430	c 32	SD653814

ID	Hill	H	RH	Grid ref.
WSD-1	**Whernside**	736	408	SD738814
WSD-2	Blea Moor	535	c 112	SD773826

ID	Hill	H	RH	Grid ref.
IGB-1	**Ingleborough**	723	c 427	SD741745
IGB-2	Simon Fell	650	c 35	SD754751
IGB-3	Park Fell	563	32	SD765770
IGB-4	Moughton	427	c 63	SD787712
IGB-5	Norber	408	c 31	SD762709
IGB-6	Smearsett Scar	363	136	SD802678
IGB-7	Feizor Thwaite	335	c 44	SD801672
IGB-8	Windy Bank	126	c 54	SD591695
IGB-9	Bull Bank	c 92	c 33	SD616718

==== North ====
ID	Hill	RH	Grid ref.
**Aye Gill Pike**	556	167	SD720886

ID	Hill	H	RH	Grid ref.
GKH-1	**Great Knoutberry Hill**	672	c 254	SD788871
GKH-2	Wold Fell	558	c 36	SD791851

ID	Hill	H	RH	Grid ref.
DFH-1	**Dodd Fell Hill**	668	230	SD840845
DFH-2	Yockenthwaite Moor	643	86	SD909810
DFH-3	Drumaldrace	614	66	SD873867
DFH-4	Woldside	596	35	SD875830
DFH-5	Snaizeholme Fell	546	c 41	SD813846
DFH-6	Addlebrough	481	c 93	SD945881

ID	Hill	H	RH	Grid ref.
BDP-1	**Buckden Pike**	702	c 207	SD960787
BDP-2	Brown Haw	584	61	SD995799
BDP-3	Naughtberry Hill	573	44	SD977818
BDP-4	Height of Hazely	553	117	SE037860
BDP-5	Penhill	546	146	SE050867
BDP-6	Harland Hill	535	c 50	SE028843

=== East ===
ID	Hill	H	RH	Grid ref.
GWS-1	**Great Whernside**	704	c 288	SE002739
GWS-2	Little Whernside	604	c 79	SE028776
GWS-3	Meugher	575	c 36	SE044704
GWS-4	Dead Man's Hill	546	c 62	SE058783
GWS-5	Simon's Seat	485	c 102	SE079598
GWS-6	Woodale Moss	459	c 36	SE076761
GWS-7	Greenhow Hill	428	c 44	SE111638
GWS-8	High Crag	420	c 33	SE090627
GWS-9	Round Hill	409	c 112	SE122535
GWS-10	The Old Pike	400	c 33	SE102526
GWS-11	Nabs	314	c 30	SE123658
GWS-12	Brimham Moor	301	c 48	SE206650
GWS-13	Askwith Moor	300	c 32	SE171510
GWS-14	Lindley Moor	292	c 118	SE210514
GWS-15	Langerton Hill	278	34	SE041622
GWS-16	Almscliff Crag	c 213	c 34	SE268490
GWS-17	How Hill	c 172	c 56	SE275670
GWS-18	Crier Hill	c 167	c 30	SE081523
GWS-19	Walton Head Whin	159	c 55	SE308500
GWS-20	Clip'd Thorn Hill	152	c 45	SE259697
GWS-21	Horse Hill	127	c 32	SE281636
GWS-22	Healthwaite Hill	115	c 41	SE297480
GWS-23	Gibbet Hill	80	c 33	SE358598
GWS-24	Bilbrough Hill	48	c 32	SE530462

==== South ====
ID	Hill	H	RH	Grid ref.
BKF-1	**Birks Fell**	610	158	SD918763
BKF-2	Horse Head Moor	609	c 31	SD893768
BKF-3	High Green Field Knott	602	66	SD845784
BKF-4	Blaydike Moss	510	c 33	SD852773
BKF-5	Cam Rakes	503	c 113	SD840810

ID	Hill	H	RH	Grid ref.
PYG-1	**Pen-y-ghent**	694	c 306	SD838733
PYG-2	Plover Hill	680	c 59	SD849752

ID	Hill	H	RH	Grid ref.
FTF-1	**Fountains Fell**	668	243	SD864715
FTF-2	Darnbrook Fell	624	40	SD884728
FTF-3	Grizedales	553	c 126	SD868643
FTF-4	Rye Loaf Hill	547	c 44	SD864633
FTF-5	Parson's Pulpit	538	c 124	SD918688
FTF-6	Proctor High Mark	531	c 45	SD937677
FTF-7	Black Hill	468	30	SD866662
FTF-8	Great Close Hill	465	c 40	SD902668
FTF-9	Warrendale Knotts	440	56	SD834642
FTF-10	Abbott Hills	415	c 40	SD903653
FTF-11	Weets Top	414	c 43	SD926632
FTF-12	Malham Moor	411	c 30	SD952648
FTF-13	High Hill	398	40	SD833635
FTF-14	Hunter Bark	315	c 38	SD826610
FTF-15	Newton Moor Top	291	c 32	SD858587
FTF-16	Limekiln Hill	236	c 30	SD941592
FTF-17	Hard Knot Hill	221	c 56	SD876550
FTF-18	Winterley Cobba	220	c 34	SD887541
FTF-19	Steeling Hill	218	c 33	SD886551
FTF-20	Hellifield Haw	217	c 40	SD859570
FTF-21	Haw Crag	206	c 57	SD913564
FTF-22	Pot Haw Hill	202	c 31	SD893548
FTF-23	Nutter Cote Hill	195	c 61	SD897480
FTF-24	Acliffe Hill	179	c 38	SD926517
FTF-25	Mickleber Hill	178	35	SD930529

==== South-east ====
ID	Hill	H	RH	Grid ref.
CCF-1	**Cracoe Fell**	508	310	SD993588
CCF-2	Brown Bank	435	c 41	SE006572
CCF-3	High Crag	357	31	SE030552
CCF-4	Elbolton	348	c 71	SE006615
CCF-5	Kail Hill	303	48	SE016613

ID	Hill	H	RH	Grid ref.
SPH-1	**Sharp Haw**	357	168	SD959552
SPH-2	Rough Haw	339	c 43	SD963558
SPH-3	Flasby Fell	283	c 41	SD962567

ID	Hill	H	RH	Grid ref.
RBM-1	**Rombald's Moor**	402	244	SE114452
RBM-2	Skipton Moor	373	c 137	SE014509
RBM-3	The Chevin	282	c 144	SE199441
RBM-4	Baildon Hill	282	c 68	SE141400
RBM-5	Haw Pike	252	c 35	SE059522
RBM-6	Billing Hill	231	c 34	SE217398
RBM-7	Tinshill Moor	c 197	c 42	SE255398
RBM-8	Garforth Cliff	104	36	SE416319

== Listed by height, within the national park ==
1. Whernside (736.6m)
2. Ingleborough (723.3m)
3. Great Shunner Fell (715.7m)
4. High Seat (709m)
5. Wild Boar Fell (708.4m)
6. Great Whernside (704m)
7. Buckden Pike (701.6m)
8. Pen-y-ghent (694.1m)
9. Great Coum (686.4m)
10. Swarth Fell (681m)
11. Plover Hill (679.9m)
12. Baugh Fell (678.4m)
13. The Calf (676.7m)
14. Calders (675.4m)
15. Lovely Seat (674.8m)
16. Great Knoutberry Hill (672.5m)
17. Rogan's Seat (671.6m)
18. Dodd Fell Hill (668m)
19. Fountains Fell (667.8m)
20. Sails (666.6m)
21. Simon Fell (649m)
22. Yockenthwaite Moor (643m)
23. Fell Head (640m)
24. Yarlside (639.2m)
25. Gragareth (628m)
26. Darnbrook Fell (624m)
27. Randygill Top (624m)
28. Drumaldrace (614m)
29. Birks Fell (610.4m)
30. Calf Top (609.6m)
31. Horse Head Moor (609.3m)
32. Arant Haw (605m)
33. Green Bell (605m)
34. Little Whernside (605m)
35. High Green Field Knott (603.2m)
36. Woldside (595.3m)
37. Simon's Seat (587m)
38. Hooksey (586m)
39. Brown Haw (584m)
40. Oxnop Common (584m)
41. Great Pinseat (583m)
42. Hazelgill Knott (578m)
43. Kensgriff (574m)
44. Naughtberry Hill (573m)
45. Pickerstone Ridge (565m)
46. Park Fell (564m)
47. Wold Fell (559m)
48. Aye Gill Pike (556.4m)
49. Hoove (554.6m)
50. Grizedales (553m)
51. Height of Hazely (553m)
52. Tarn Seat (551m)
53. Rye Loaf Hill (547m)
54. Kirkby Fell (546.4m)
55. Redshaw Moss (545m)
56. West Fell (542m)
57. Castle Knott (538m)
58. Parson's Pulpit (538m)
59. Blea Moor (535m)
60. Harland Hill (535m)
61. Uldale Head (532m)
62. Proctor High Mark (531m)
63. Harter Fell (521m)
64. Blaydike Moss (510m)
65. Cracoe Fell (507.8m)
66. Cam Rakes (503m)
67. Hand Lake (499.6m)
68. Linghaw (498.8m)
69. Kisdon (498.6m)
70. Wandale Hill (497m)
71. Calver Hill (487.2m)
72. Simon's Seat (484.9m)
73. Addlebrough (478.9m)
74. Langdale Knott (477m)
75. Fremington Edge (475m)
76. Blease Fell (474m)
77. Winder (473m)
78. Great Close Hill (465m)
79. Warrendale Knotts (440.8m)
80. Barbon Low Fell (438m)
81. Brown Bank (435m)
82. Hoggs Hill (430m)
83. Moughton (427.4m)
84. High Crag (Craven Moor) (420m)
85. Abbot Hills (415m)
86. Weets Top (414m)
87. Knott (413.1m)
88. Brown Moor (412m)
89. Long Scar Pike (401m)
90. The Old Pike (400.4m)
91. High Hill (399m)
92. Beacon Hill (391m)
93. Ash Fell (385m)
94. Nettle Hill (382.6m)
95. Holme Knott (370m)
96. Smearsett Scar (363m)
97. High Crag (Embsay) (356.8m)
98. Sharp Haw (356.6m)
99. Little Asby Scar (356m)
100. Birkett Common (352m)
101. Elbolton (348m)
102. Bluecaster (345m)
103. Rough Haw (339m)
104. Feizor Thwaite (335m)
105. Hunter Bark (319m)
106. Kelleth Rigg (318m)
107. Knotts (305m)*
108. Helms Knott (303m)
109. Hutton's Monument (303m)
110. Kail Hill (303m)
111. Fell Head (Great Asby) (302m)
112. Newton Moor Top (291m)
113. Flasby Fell (283m)
114. Langerton Hill (278m)
115. Swinden Hill (274m)
116. How Hill (252.5m)
117. Park Hill (245.6m)
118. Talebrigg Hill (240m)
119. Shawrigg Hill (235m)
120. Hellifield Haw (217m)
121. Horrows Hill (207m)
122. Terry Bank (203m)
123. Lingber Hill (200.6m)
124. Haugh (186.1m)
125. Bainsbank Hill (103.7m)

*this summit is topographically more closely connected to the Lake District

=== Hills by height bracket ===
>700m	7
650-700m	13
600-650m	15
550-600m	17
500-550m	14
450-500m	12
400-450m	12
350-400m	10
300-350m	11
250-300m	5
200-250m	7
150-200m	1
100-150m	1

== Hills over 300 metres outside the National Park boundaries ==
The northern boundary for the purposes of this list is taken as the Stainmore Gap, and the western boundary the M6 in the northern part, and the Lune in the southern part. Hills marked with a * are in the North Pennines National Landscape. Hills marked ** are in Nidderdale National Landscape.

1. Nine Standards Rigg (661.9m)*
2. Meugher (575m)**
3. Nateby Common (547m)*
4. Dead Man's Hill (545.4m)**
5. High Greygrits (522m)*
6. Moudy Mea (519.8m)*
7. Woodale Moss (459m)**
8. Greenhow Hill Top (428m)**
9. Long Rigg (413m)*
10. Whit Fell (411m)
11. Round Hill (409m)**
12. Birkett Hill (north-east) (405m)*
13. Rombalds Moor (402.5m)
14. Gayles Moor (396m)
15. Weather Hill (392m)
16. Birkett Hill (south-west) (383m)*
17. Skipton Moor (373m)
18. Hardendale Nab (372m)
19. Forty Acres (368m)
20. High Out Wood (352m)*
21. Barden Fell (317.6m)
22. Nabs (314m)**
23. Windrigg Hill (313m)
24. Brimham Rocks (301m)**
25. Askwith Moor (300m)**

== Sources ==
- Database of British Hills
