= John Barraclough Fell =

English railway engineer and inventor

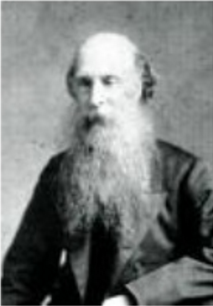
John Barraclough Fell

John Barraclough Fell (1815 – 18 October 1902) was an English railway engineer and inventor of the Fell mountain railway system.

Fell spent the early part of his life in London, living with his parents. About 1835 he moved with them to the Lake District. In 1840, he married a 25-year-old woman named Martha in Kirkstall, West Yorkshire. In the 1840s he worked on the first of several railways he would help construct: the Furness and Whitehaven Railway.

He continued working professionally on railways while living in Italy in the 1850s. Fell helped construct several early Italian lines, including the Central of Italy, the Maremma, and the Genoa and Voltri. He frequently crossed Mont Cenis, between Italy and France, by road, and this reportedly inspired him to create his Fell Centre-Rail System.

The Fell Centre-Rail System tackled the problem of trains climbing and descending steep gradients, which was often necessary until improvements in tunnelling were developed. In Fell's system, a third rail was run between the two rails of the train tracks, and was gripped on its sides by additional drive wheels on a specially designed locomotive as well as the brake pads of a special brake van. Back in England, a patent was issued to Fell for the idea in 1863. He conducted experiments with his system in 1864–65 on a purpose built railway near Whaley Bridge adjacent to - and, at one point, passing under - the Bunsal Incline of the Cromford and High Peak Railway at gradients of 1 in 13 and 1 in 12, with curves up to 2.5 chains radius.

The tests attracted attention of the governments of Britain and France, and the first railway using the Fell Centre-Rail System was a temporary one built in 1866–67 over the Mont Cenis Pass, the same Mont Cenis that had served as Fell's inspiration. This railway was used from 1868 to 1871, primarily to transport English mail to India as part of the All Red Route. It was replaced by the then in progress Mont Cenis Tunnel after only three years because improvements in tunnelling shortened construction time of the 13.6 kilometre tunnel.

Its worth proven in practice, other railways subsequently used the Fell system, including the Estrada de Ferro Cantagalo (Cantagalo Railway) in Brazil, and the New Zealand Railways Department for the Rimutaka Incline and for braking only on the Rewanui and Roa Inclines. Several other railways used the system for many years, sometimes only for braking.

Fell also experimented with other kinds of railways, including early light rail systems, such as the Yarlside Iron Mines tramway; and rapid-construction field railways for the British War Office, such as the Aldershot Narrow Gauge Suspension Railway. His son, G. Noble Fell, helped him with some of his research.

Fell related in his later years his three greatest achievements:

1. launching the first steamer on the English Lakes
2. starting the first railway in Italy
3. carrying the first railway over the Alps

He pioneered the Malta Railway, now defunct, the only railway system ever built in Malta.

The zoologist Dr Barry Fell was a grandson.

== Legacy ==
The Snaefell Mountain Railway on the Isle of Man still uses the Fell system for braking.

A steam engine which entered service in 1877 is preserved in the Fell Locomotive Museum at Featherston, New Zealand. Whilst it has become commonly accepted that the locomotive Pentewan for Cornwall's Pentewan Railway was the first Manning Wardle product built under Fell's 1873 patent for long wheelbase six-coupled locomotives for non-guide wheel railways, this was not the case. The honour went to a pair of 0-6-0ST's (Manning Wardle 440 and 441 of 1873) built for the Bay of Havana and Matanzas Railway in Cuba. The remains of No. 441 still exist in Havana.
