= Kisdon =

Mountain in North Yorkshire, England

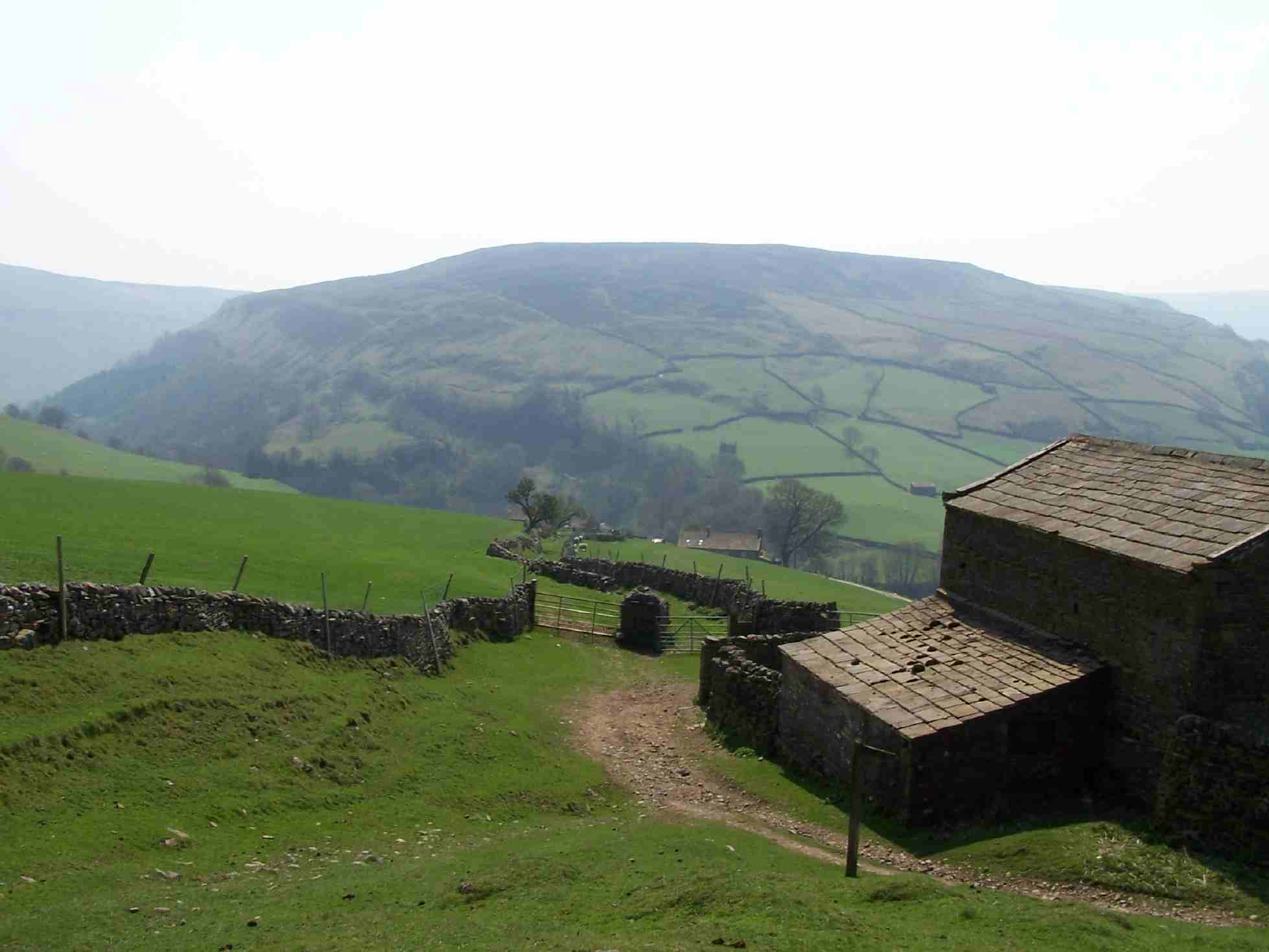
- Kisdon seen from the Pennine Way above Keld

Highest point
- Elevation: 499 m (1,637 ft)
- Prominence: c. 184 m
- Parent peak: Great Shunner Fell
- Listing: Marilyn
- Coordinates: 54°23′37″N 2°09′31″W

Naming
- Language of name: Old Norse

Geography
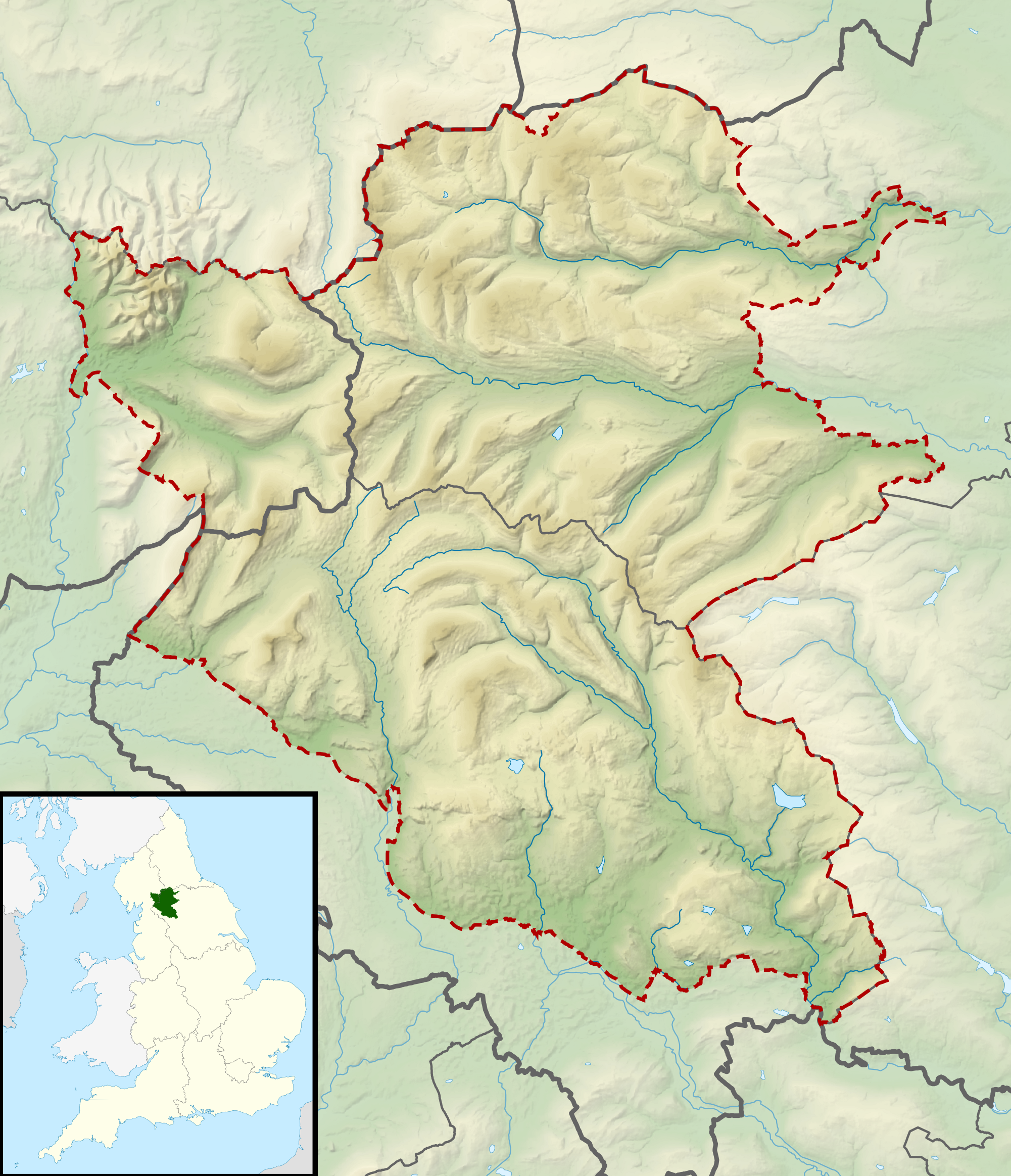
- Location within Yorkshire Dales
- Location: Yorkshire Dales, England
- Parent range: Pennines
- OS grid: SD898998
- Topo map(s): OS Landrangers 92, 98; OS Explorer Outdoor Leisure 30

Kisdon, also called Kisdon Hill, is a fell situated in upper Swaledale in the Yorkshire Dales National Park in North Yorkshire, England.

== Geography and history ==
Kisdon was named by early Norse settlers. Kisdon Farm is on the southern slopes above Straw Beck. The fell is unusual in that it is an isolated area of high ground with no ridges connecting it to other fells. This came about at the end of the last ice age, when the moraine left by the retreating glacier blocked the original course of the River Swale on the west side of the fell and diverted it to its present course, forming a gorge to the east and leaving Kisdon isolated from other high ground. Kisdon's isolation gives it the status of a Marilyn, even though it has only a modest height of 499 metres (1636 feet).

Another unusual feature of Kisdon is that it has no official footpath to the highest point, despite being crossed by two busy rights of way high up on the fell. One of these is the Pennine Way between the hamlets of Thwaite and Keld, which reaches a height of 420 metres on the eastern shoulder of the fell; while the bridleway between Keld and Muker, also known as the Old Corpse Road because it was formerly used as a corpse road to transport bodies for burial in consecrated ground lower down the valley, crosses the fell on the western side at a height of 470 metres. Kisdon lies within a band of Yoredale limestone. It is on Kisdon that the band attains its maximum thickness of 40 metres.

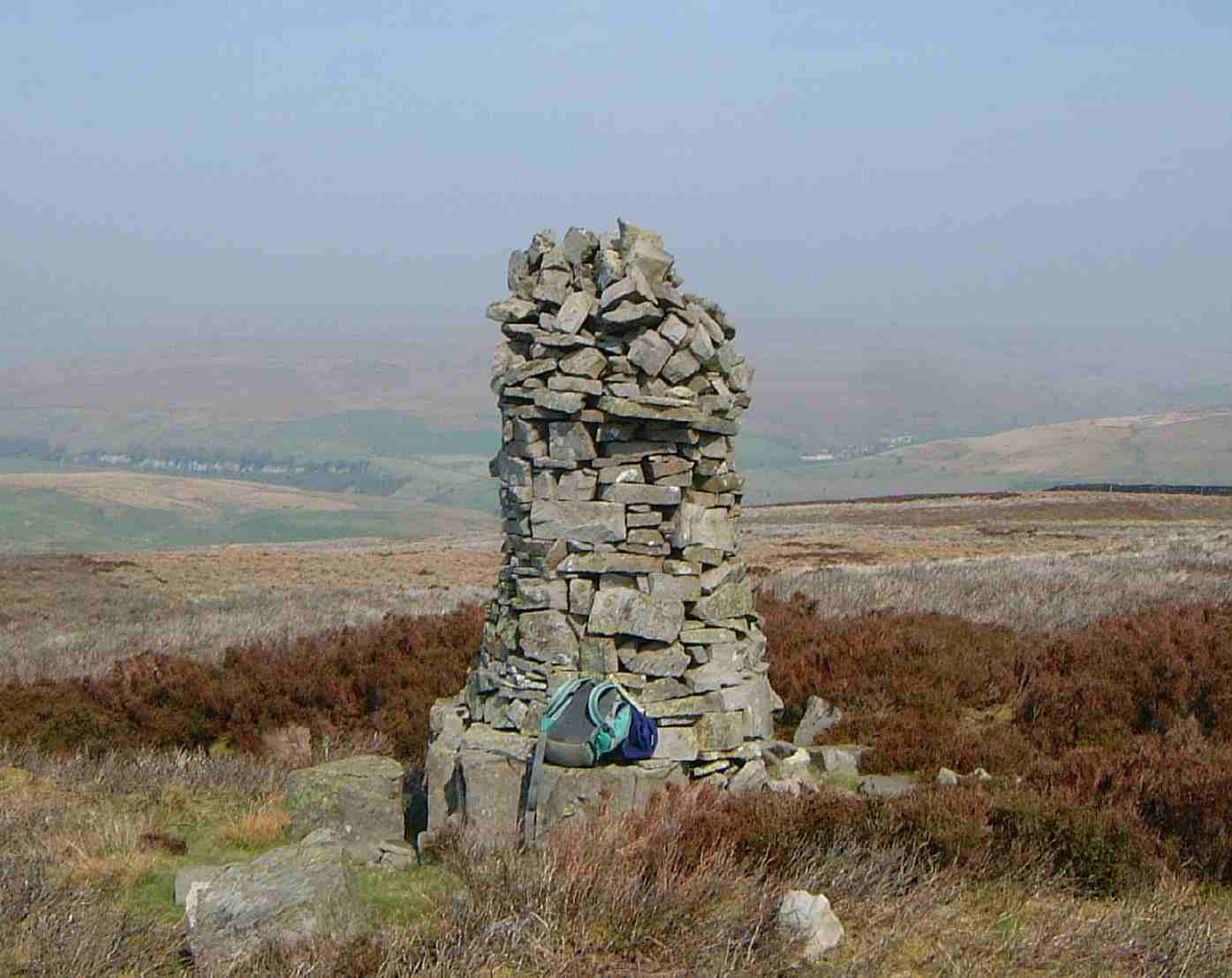
Kisdon's 2.5-metre-high (8.2 ft) summit cairn.

== Ascent and summit ==
The fell is crossed by many high wire-topped dry-stone walls, which can make attaining the highest point of the fell awkward. Routes to the summit start at Muker, Thwaite and Keld and the bridleway should be used to attain the summit plateau where it joins a high wall that can be followed north to the summit of the fell, which is marked by a substantial cairn, although the highest point seems to be a few metres east of it. 100 metres east of the summit is a five-metre-deep shake hole, which is marked on the Ordnance Survey map as a pothole, so the depression may go much deeper on closer investigation.

The grass- and heather-covered summit provides panoramic views of the surrounding area. To the east, Rogan's Seat, including the prominent valley of Swinner Gill, dominates the landscape. To the southwest, Great Shunner Fell and Lovely Seat can be seen, with the Buttertubs Pass lying between them. Walkers descending eastward toward the Pennine Way may also encounter several waterfalls near Keld, including Kisdon Force, East Gill Force, Catrake Force, and Wain Wath Force.

== Scar Closes, Kisdon Side SSSI ==
The western side of Kisdon has been designated as a Site of Special Scientific Interest (SSSI) over an area of 3.7 hectares since 1988. The SSSI takes the form of four grazed enclosures with the combination of Calcareous grassland growing on limestone rock supporting exceptional and varied botanical species. The steepest of the enclosures has a considerable population of Juniperus communis (common juniper), which has survived since the last ice age and appears to be regenerating. Other species include Sesleria albicans (blue moor grass), Carex pulicaris (flea sedge), Galium sterneri (limestone bedstraw), Orchis mascula (early purple orchid) and Primula vulgaris (primrose).
