= Sharp Haw =

Hill in North Yorkshire, England

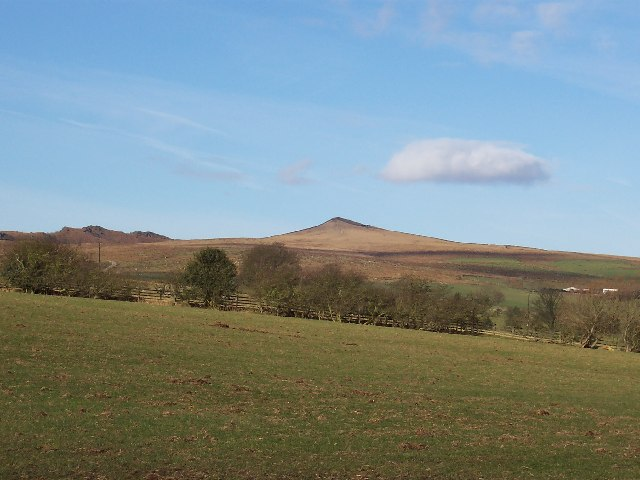
- Sharp Haw seen from the south-eastern approach from Skipton.

Highest point
- Elevation: 357 m (1,171 ft)
- Prominence: 168 m (551 ft)
- Parent peak: Thorpe Fell Top
- Listing: Marilyn
- Coordinates: 53°59′34″N 2°03′50″W

Geography
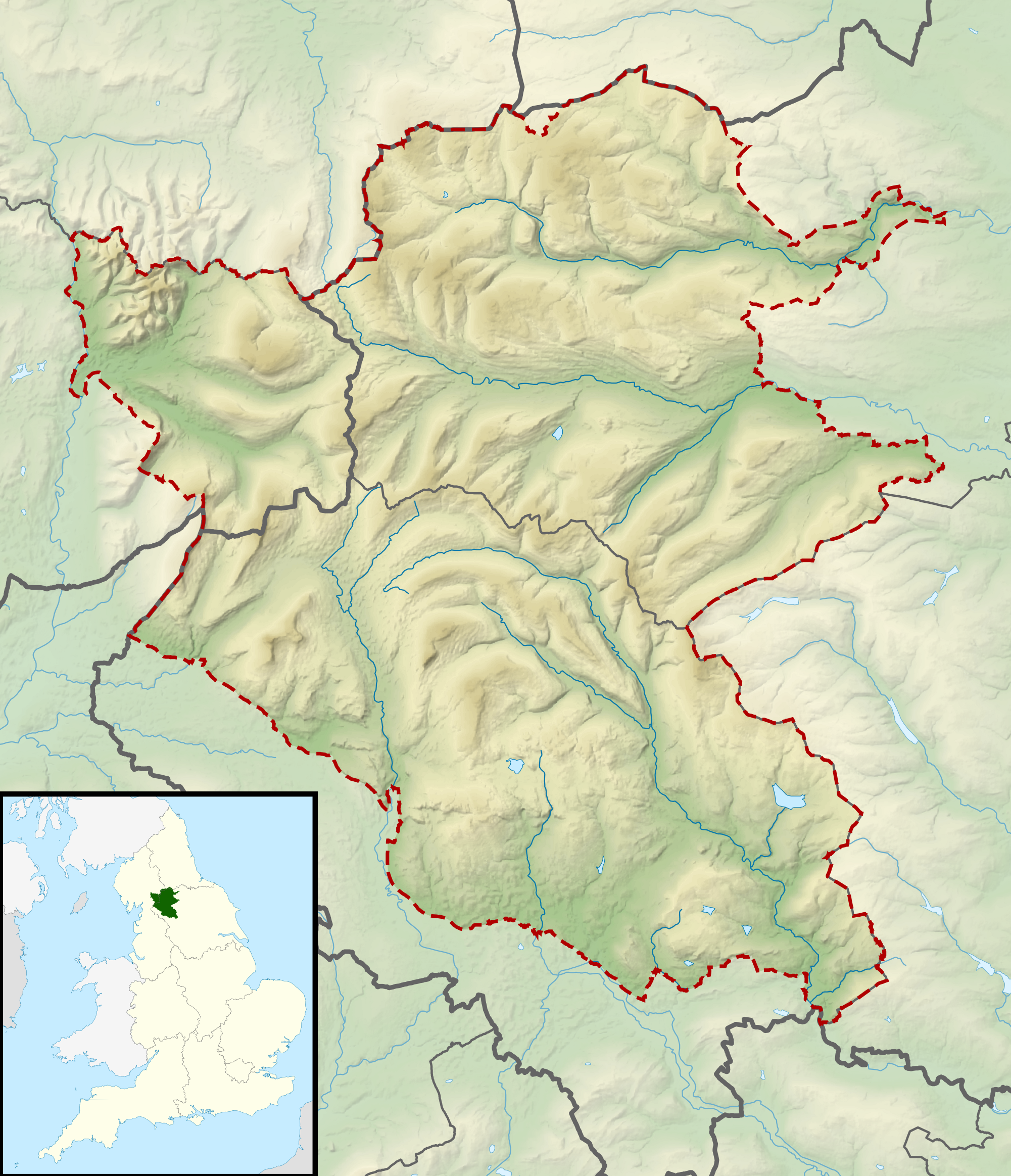
- Location within Yorkshire Dales
- Location: Yorkshire Dales, England
- OS grid: SD959552
- Topo map: OS Landranger 103

Sharp Haw is a hill on the southern edge of the Yorkshire Dales, located just within the National Park. Being the last outpost of the hills before the broad Aire valley, and with a sharp summit from many angles, it is prominent and easily recognisable from much of the area to the south. The hill has an elevation of 357 metres (1,171 ft).

From the summit there are views over the Aire valley, to Gargrave, Skipton and the Leeds and Liverpool Canal, to the east into Wharfedale and to the north into Malhamdale.

Although Ordnance Survey maps do not show a path to the summit, there is a path from the public bridleway, but this runs alongside the peak, not to the summit. It's popular with cyclists.

The pastures up Sharp Haw are home to sheep and beef cows, as well as ground nesting birds.

The word Haw comes from the Old English hawian, and means view.
