= Aldershot narrow-gauge suspension railway =

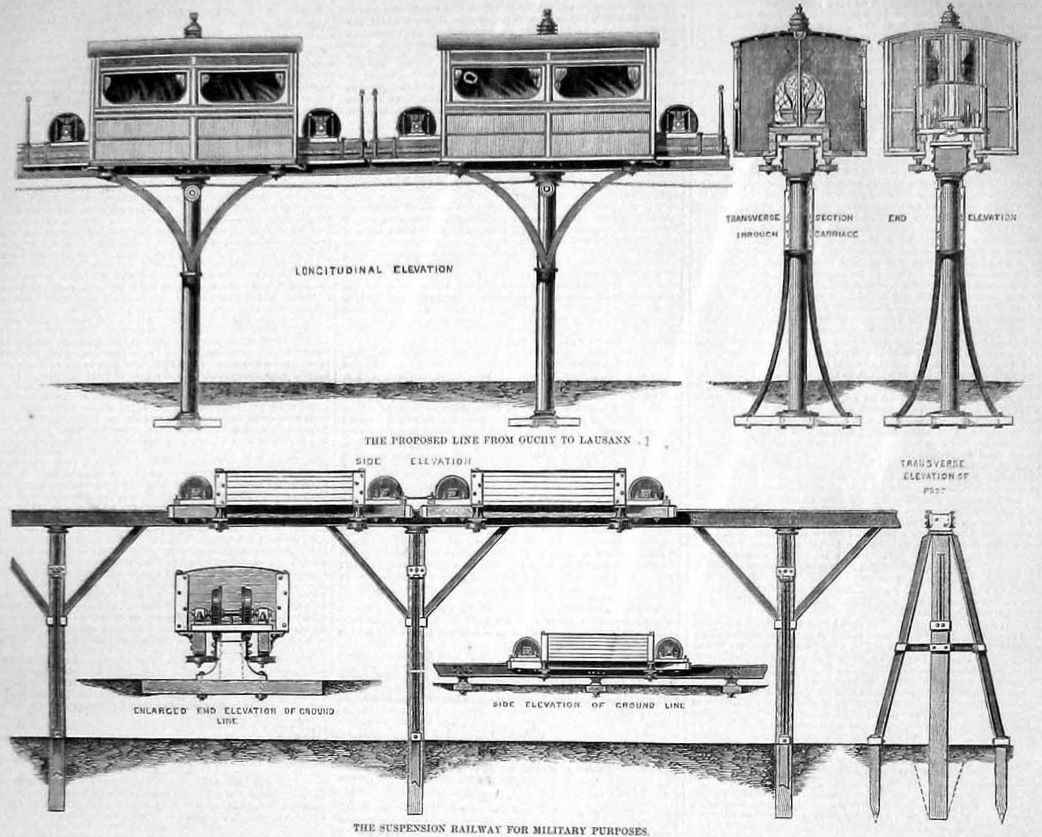
Narrow Gauge Suspension Railway designed by J.B. Fell, C.E.

The Aldershot narrow-gauge suspension railway was built in 1872 as an innovative experimental railway at Aldershot Camp in Hampshire, England. It had a gauge of 18 in (457 mm) and incorporated the suspension principle, invented and patented by John Barraclough Fell.

== History ==
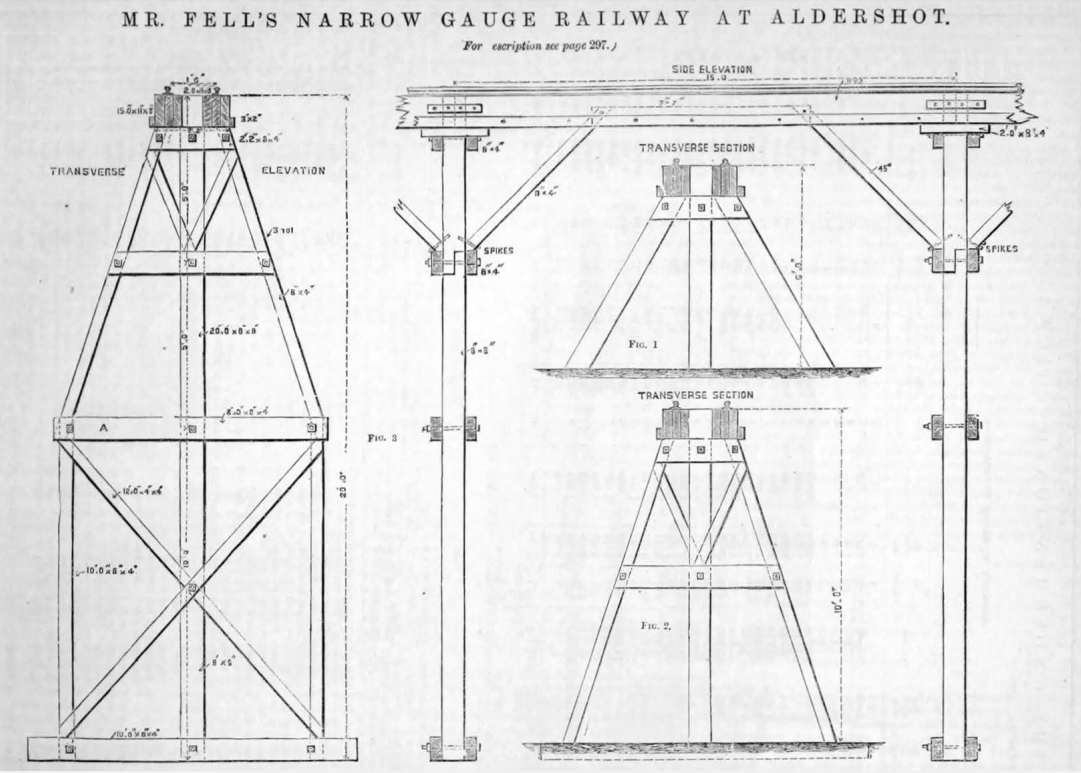
Mr. Fell's narrow-gauge railway at Aldershot

The whole railway consisted of a continuous structure, formed of wood or iron. A single row of pillars stood at regular intervals along the line; the lower ends of the pillars rested upon wooden sleepers, and were steadied by transverse diagonal struts. Holes were dug in the ground, the pillars placed in position, and the earth well rammed down. The length of the pillar varied according to the contour of the ground, for their upper ends must range with each other, so as to carry the superstructure; this was formed by two longitudinal beams of wood (or iron) placed side by side, with a space between them, bolted to, strutted from, and supported by the pillars.

The railway could sometimes be as little as 3 feet (0.9 m) above the surface; while crossing valleys or ravines it could be from 20 to 30 feet (6.1 to 9.1 m) above the ground, and it could have curves or gradients as on any other railway. The longitudinal beams formed continuous sleepers and carried four rails – two on their upper surfaces and two on their outer sides; the surface rails, which carried the train, were made of iron and could be of any gauge, from 8 inches (200 mm) to 18 in (457 mm); the side rails were of wood or iron, nailed along near the lower edges of the beams, so as to be below the level of the carrying rails. They were peculiar to this system, and acted as guides for the horizontal wheels of the waggons and carriages. Where sidings occurred, or shunting was required, the switches were formed by making a 20 feet (6.1 m) length of the railway to a point on one end, while the other end rested on a pair of rollers which travelled from the main line to and from the siding.

"A committee of Royal Engineers having been appointed by the War Office to investigate the merits of the system reported so favourably that an experimental locomotive line of 18 in (457 mm) gauge, about 20 miles (32.2 km) in length, has been made at Aldershot Camp. All the details appear to have been carefully considered, and, if the result were as satisfactory as anticipated, it was intended to make several miles of this railway in and about the camps at Aldershot, and in leisure times the soldiers could be exercised in taking them down and putting it up again for military transport service." The experiments referred to formed one of a series which have been held at Aldershot during the last three months of 1872, and it was reported that the result fully justified all that its inventor has stated respecting the scheme. The lines made on this principle were said to be capable of carrying sufficient quantities of military stores, including field artillery and siege guns of 7-tons weight.

Passenger trains were run over the line at a speed of 20 mph (32 km/h), mixed trains at 15 mph (24 km/h) and goods trains at 10 mph (16 km/h). The maximum speed attained with a passenger train was 30 mph (48 km/h), and the carriages ran as smoothly as those of a standard-gauge railway. There was no perceptible oscillation of the structure, and the vibration was no more than was usual with contemporary iron and timber railway bridges.

== Track ==
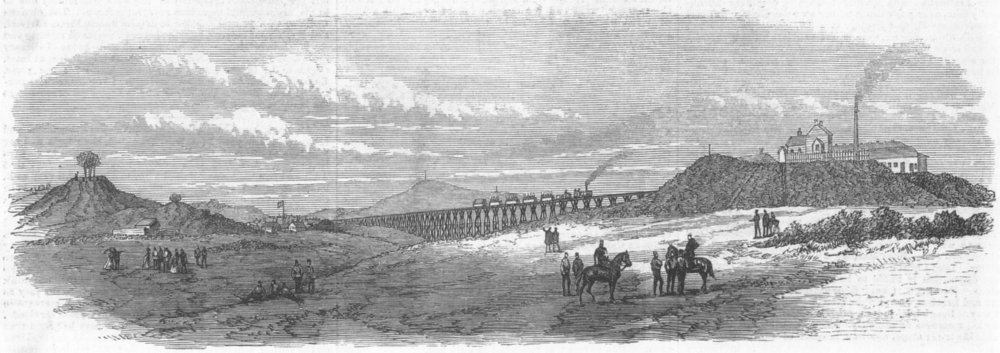
Wood print "Military Narrow-Gauge Railway, South Camp, Aldershot", 1872

The track was laid down between the Field Stores Depot and the Barrack Stores. The line was upwards of one mile in length. About two-thirds was laid on curves from 3 ch (60 m; 200 ft) to 7 ch (140 m; 460 ft) radius, and there was a gradient of 1 in 50 for a length of 770 feet (234.7 m) upon a trestle bridge of 20 to 25 feet (6.1 to 7.6 m) in height, the gauge being 18 in (457 mm). The rails were laid on two longitudinal timber beams, supported at intervals of 10 and 15 feet (3.0 and 4.6 m) by posts with lateral struts.

The depth of the guide rails below the carrying rails was 12 inches (304.8 mm), and this was equivalent to an extension of gauge, so that as regards stability and safety the gauge of 18 in (457 mm) on this system of railway is equivalent to one of 3 ft 6 in (1,067 mm) on an ordinary railway.

== Rolling stock ==
=== Locomotive ===
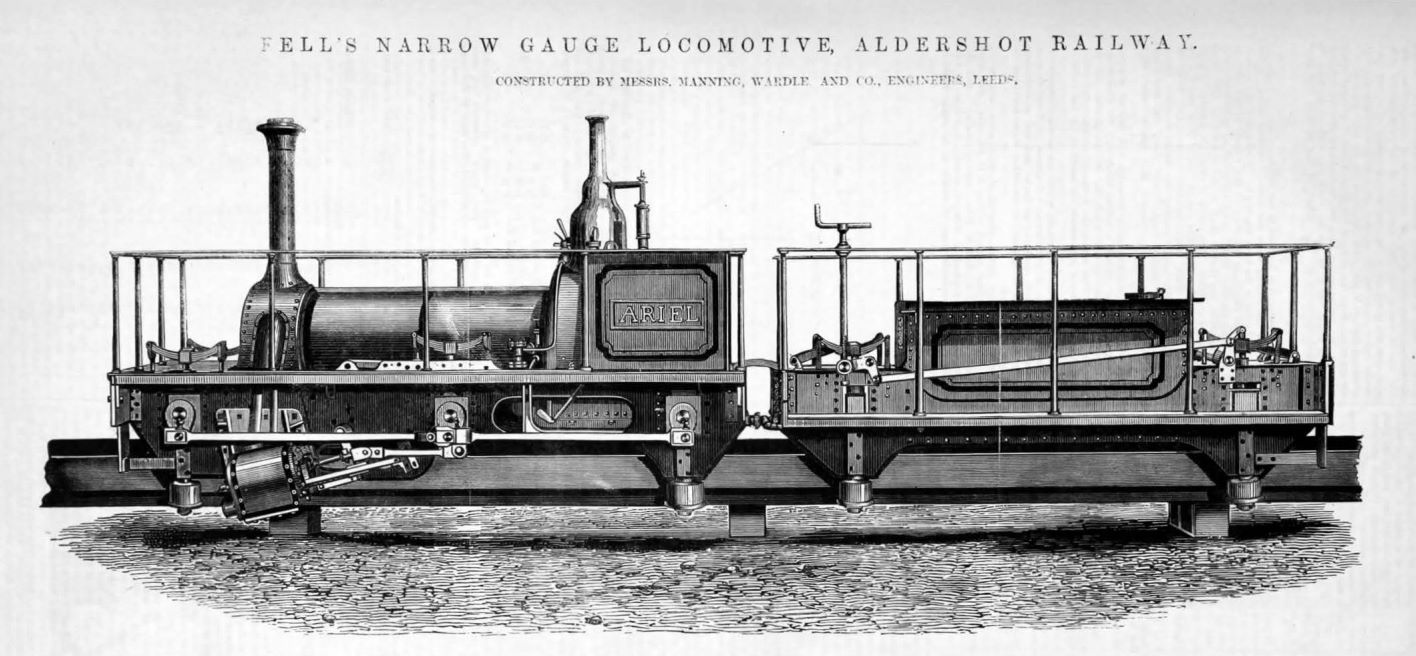
Fell's narrow-gauge locomotive MW 412 for the Aldershot Railway constructed by Messrs. Manning, Wardle, and Co., Leeds

Manning, Wardle & Co. of the Boyne Engine Works, Leeds designed and built a special locomotive for its operation. It had to meet military as well as other requirements. The general plan of the structure of the locomotive has been designed by J.B. Fell, but the working plans were prepared and the engine built by Manning, Wardle & Co, Leeds. The engine weighed 4 1/2 long tons (4.6 t; 5.0 short tons) and the tender 3 1/2 long tons (3.6 t; 3.9 short tons) with coal and water. There were three pairs of driving-wheels coupled, each 16 inches (406.4 mm) in diameter. There were also four horizontal wheels running upon guide rails fixed on the lower edges of the beams.

=== Wagons ===
The waggons were suspended from two pairs of wheels placed not under the body but at each end of it; the body of the wagon was thus brought down to about 3 inches (76.2 mm) above the carrying rails. They were suspended below the axles, by which arrangement the centre of gravity was brought very low, and they were furnished with horizontal wheels running against the guide rails, whereby the equilibrium of the carriage to leave was maintained and it was rendered almost impossible for it to leave the rails.

The bodies of the wagons are 8 feet (2.4 m) long, 5 feet (1.5 m) wide, 2 feet (0.61 m) deep, and calculated to carry a load of three tons each, or from 300 to 400 cu ft (8.5 to 11.3 m^{3}) of bulky articles.

== See also ==
- Yarlside Iron Mines tramway
- Lartigue Monorail
