= Yarlside Iron Mines tramway =

Coordinates: 54.130059°N 3.1842703°W

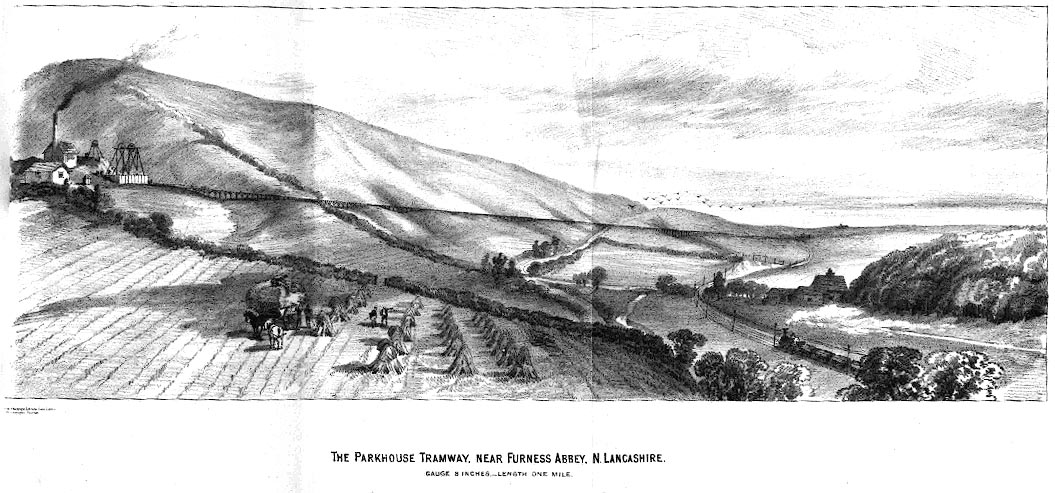
Parkhouse Mineral Railway near Furness Abbey, North Lancashire. Gauge 8 inches, length one mile.

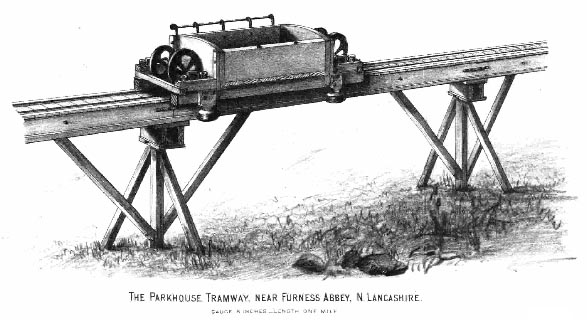
Waggon of the Parkhouse Mineral Railway.

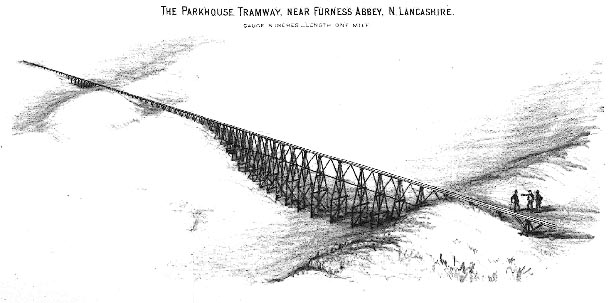
Trestle Bridge of the Parkhouse Mineral Railway.

The Yarlside Iron Mines tramway or Parkhouse Mineral Railway was built as a one-mile (1.6 km) long innovative railway from the Parkhouse Haematite Ore Mines to the Roose railway station on the Furness Railway, then in north Lancashire, now in Cumbria, England. Similar to a monorail, it had stabilising side rollers, invented and patented by John Barraclough Fell.

The Yarlside area near Barrow-in-Furness served by this railway is unrelated to Yarlside Fell, which is 33 miles (53 km) to the east.

== History ==
=== Yarlside Iron Mines tramway ===
John Barraclough Fell designed and built in 1868 the original Yarlside Iron Mines tramway as a horse drawn monorail from an exchange siding at the Furness Railway to the Yarlside Iron Mines.

=== Parkhouse Tramway ===
Two years later, in 1870, John Barraclough Fell replaced it with another experimental narrow gauge railway line, dubbed the Parkhouse Tramway, named after the Parkhouse Farm west of the mines. This had a gauge of 8 inches (200 mm) and had also a very low centre of gravity and stabilising side rollers on a central beam consisting of two trusses. It was driven by a stationary engine and endless wire rope. It could transport up to 100,000 tons per year. The waggons were each loaded with one ton of iron ore, and small carriages with eight passengers were run with perfect steadiness and safety at a speed of 15 to 20 miles per hour.

The line became a standard gauge railway in 1873.

== See also ==
- Aldershot Narrow Gauge Suspension Railway
- Hathorn Davey
