= Lovely Seat =

Peak in the Yorkshire Dales, England

Lovely Seat (Lunasett)
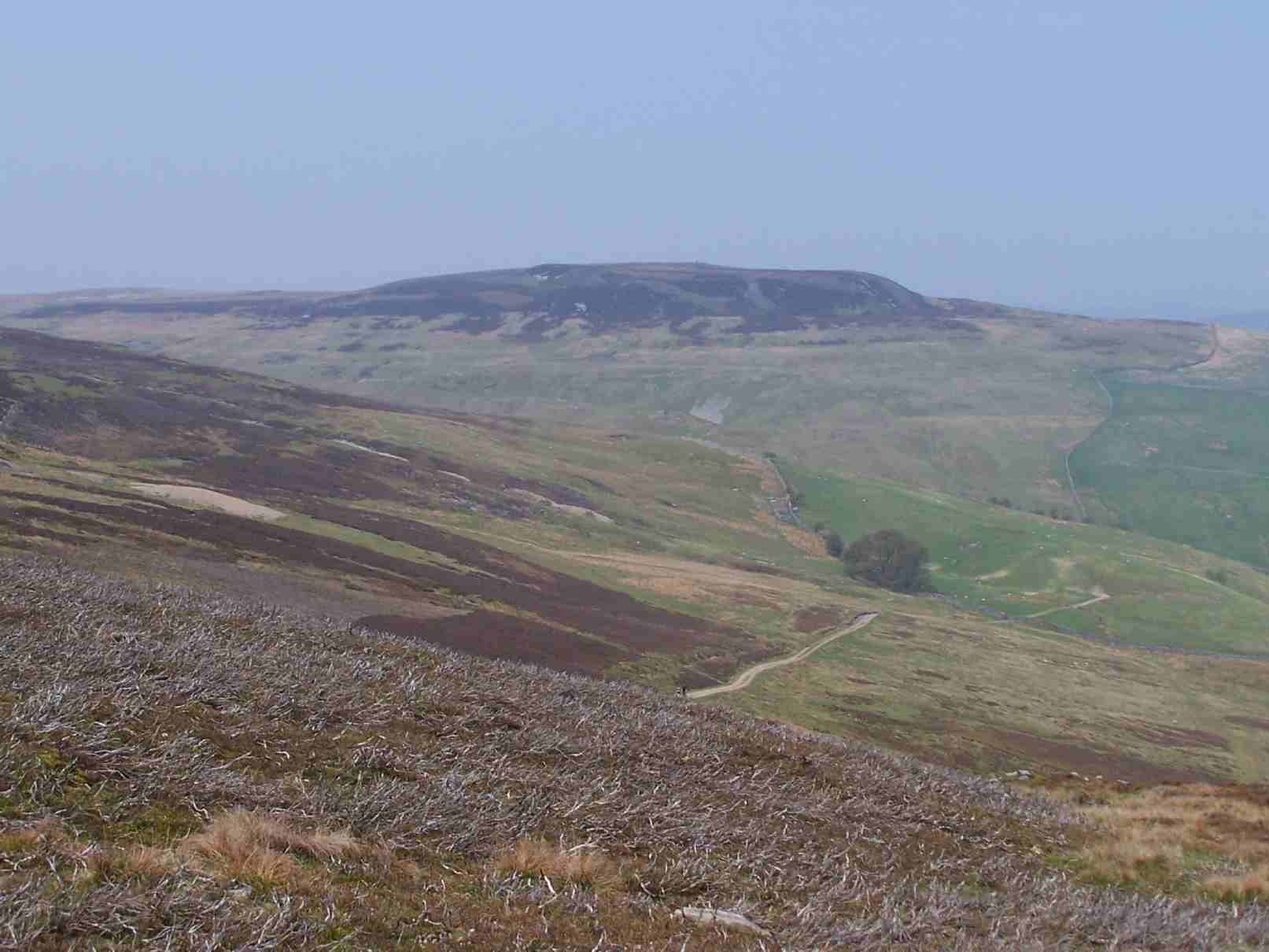
- Lovely Seat seen from Askrigg; Common, 5 miles (8 km) to the east

Highest point
- Elevation: 674.7 m (2,214 ft)
- Prominence: 149.1 m (489 ft)^{1}
- Parent peak: Great Shunner Fell
- Listing: Hewitt, Nuttall
- Coordinates: 54°21′01″N 2°11′21″W

Geography
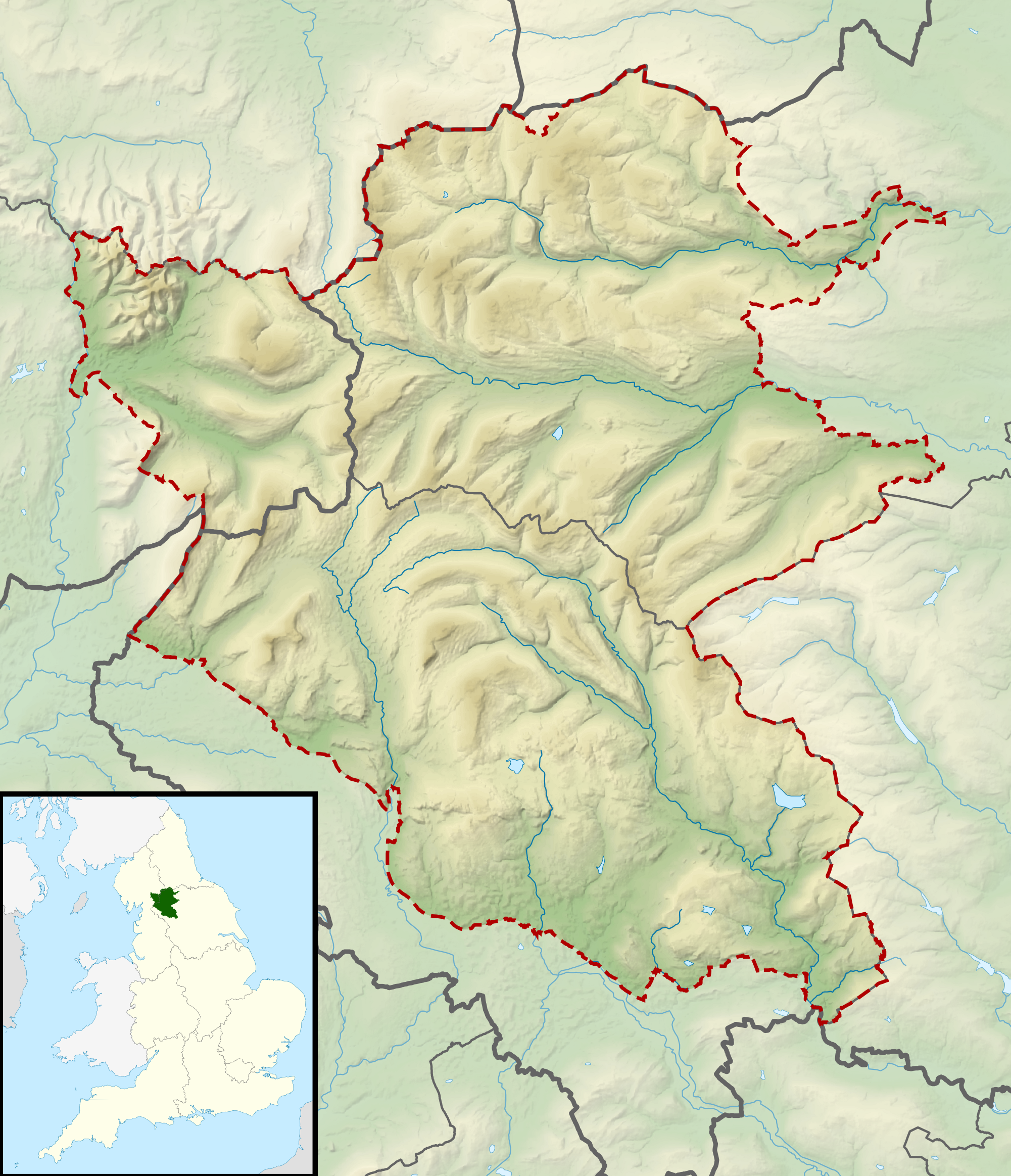
- Location within Yorkshire Dales
- Location: Yorkshire Dales, England
- OS grid: SD879950
- Topo map: OS Landranger 98

Lovely Seat, originally known as Lunasett, is a fell in the Yorkshire Dales National Park in North Yorkshire, England. Situated at grid reference SD878950 three miles (five km) north of the town of Hawes, it is part of the high ground which separates Wensleydale from Swaledale and the highest point of Abbotside Common reaching a height of 675 metres (2,215 feet). The fell is separated from its neighbour to the west, Great Shunner Fell, by the Buttertubs Pass which carries the minor motor road between Hawes in Wensleydale and Thwaite in Swaledale. The name Lunasett derives from the Norse dialect moon pasture; Commoners of Abbotside still use the original name. It appears as Lovely Seat in an Ordnance Survey map of 1856.

The fell is very rarely climbed directly from the valley and is usually ascended from the top of the Buttertubs Pass in conjunction with nearby Great Shunner Fell. The latter is climbed first from Hawes or Thwaite using the Pennine Way, after which it is a short walk to descend to the top of the pass and then climb to the summit of Lovely Seat following a fence which helps navigation in bad conditions.

The summit is adorned by a fair-sized cairn and a stone-built chair, and gives good views of the Yorkshire Three Peaks to the south. 300 metres west of the summit are a series of stone cairns which are clearly visible on the skyline when the fell is viewed from a distance.

== Footnote ==
1. Lovely Seat was added to the list of Marilyns in 1998, but was resurveyed in May 2010 and found to lack the required 150m prominence to qualify for inclusion and therefore has been removed from the list.
