= Randygill Top =

Highest point
- Elevation: 624 m (2,047 ft)
- Prominence: 131 m (430 ft)
- Parent peak: Yarlside
- Listing: Marilyn, Hewitt, Nuttall
- Coordinates: 54.39486°N 2.483379°W

Geography
- Location: Westmorland and Furness, Cumbria, England
- Parent range: Howgill Fells

Randygill Top is a mountain located in the Howgill Fells, Cumbria (historically Westmorland), England.
