= Calders (Yorkshire Dales) =

Coordinates: 54°21′30″N 2°30′32″W

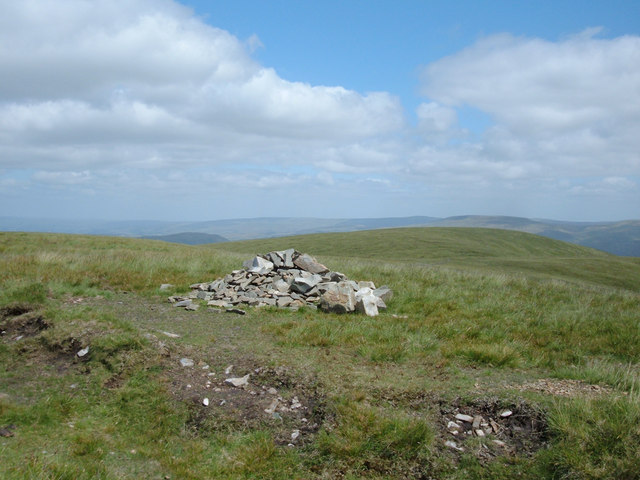
The summit cairn of Calders

Calders is a summit of 2,211 feet (674 m) in the Howgill Fells, Cumbria, England. It lies about 2/3 mile (1 km) south-east of the summit of The Calf and is classified as a Hewitt.
