= Hoove =

Hill in North Yorkshire, England

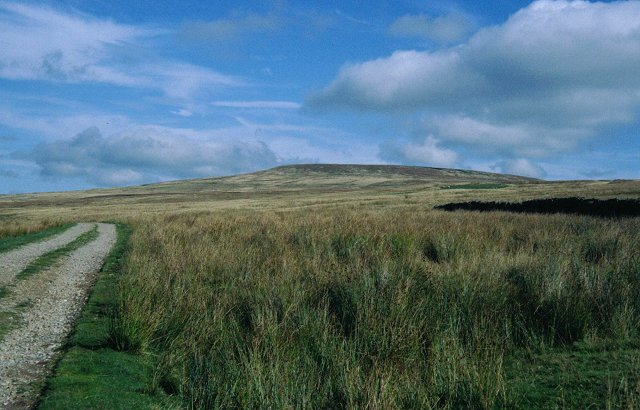
- Looking across to Hoove from Mell Close

Highest point
- Elevation: 554 m (1,818 ft)
- Prominence: 179 m (587 ft)
- Parent peak: Rogan's Seat
- Listing: Marilyn
- Coordinates: 54°27′34″N 1°59′39″W

Geography
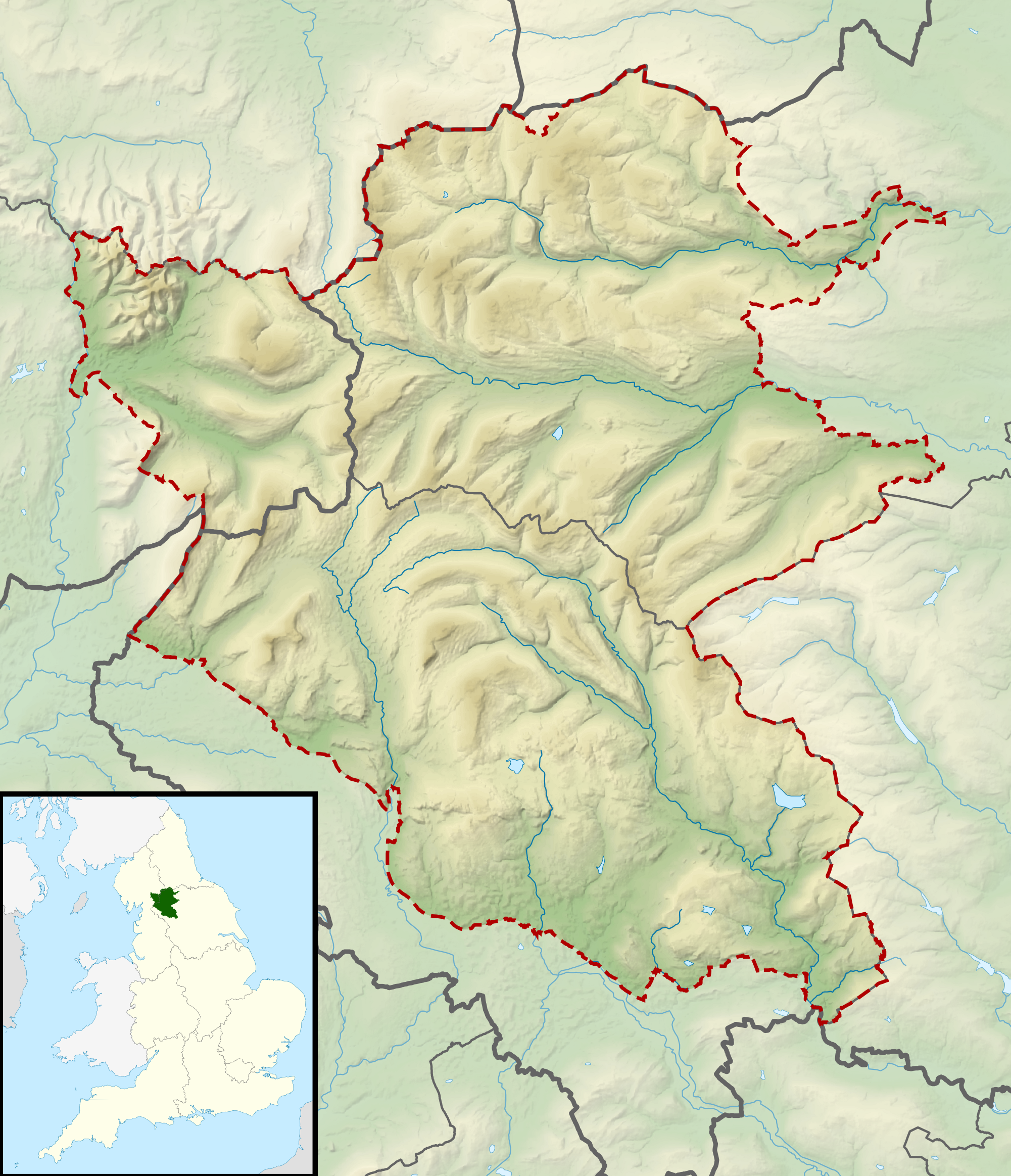
- Location within Yorkshire Dales
- Location: Yorkshire Dales, England
- OS grid: NZ001069

Hoove is a hill in the northern Yorkshire Dales in North Yorkshire, England, near the town of Barnard Castle in County Durham. Its elevation is 554 metres (1,818 ft), and it is classified as a Marilyn (a hill with topographic prominence of at least 150m).
