= Aye Gill Pike =

Geographic feature in Cumbria, England

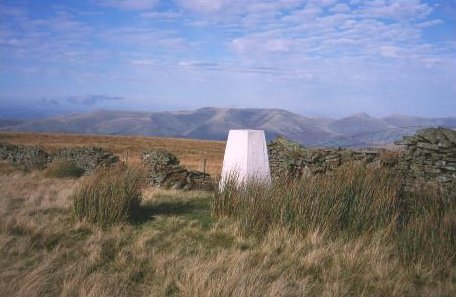
- Aye Gill Pike Summit

Highest point
- Elevation: 556 m (1,824 ft)
- Listing: Marilyn
- Coordinates: 54°17′33″N 2°25′50″W

Geography
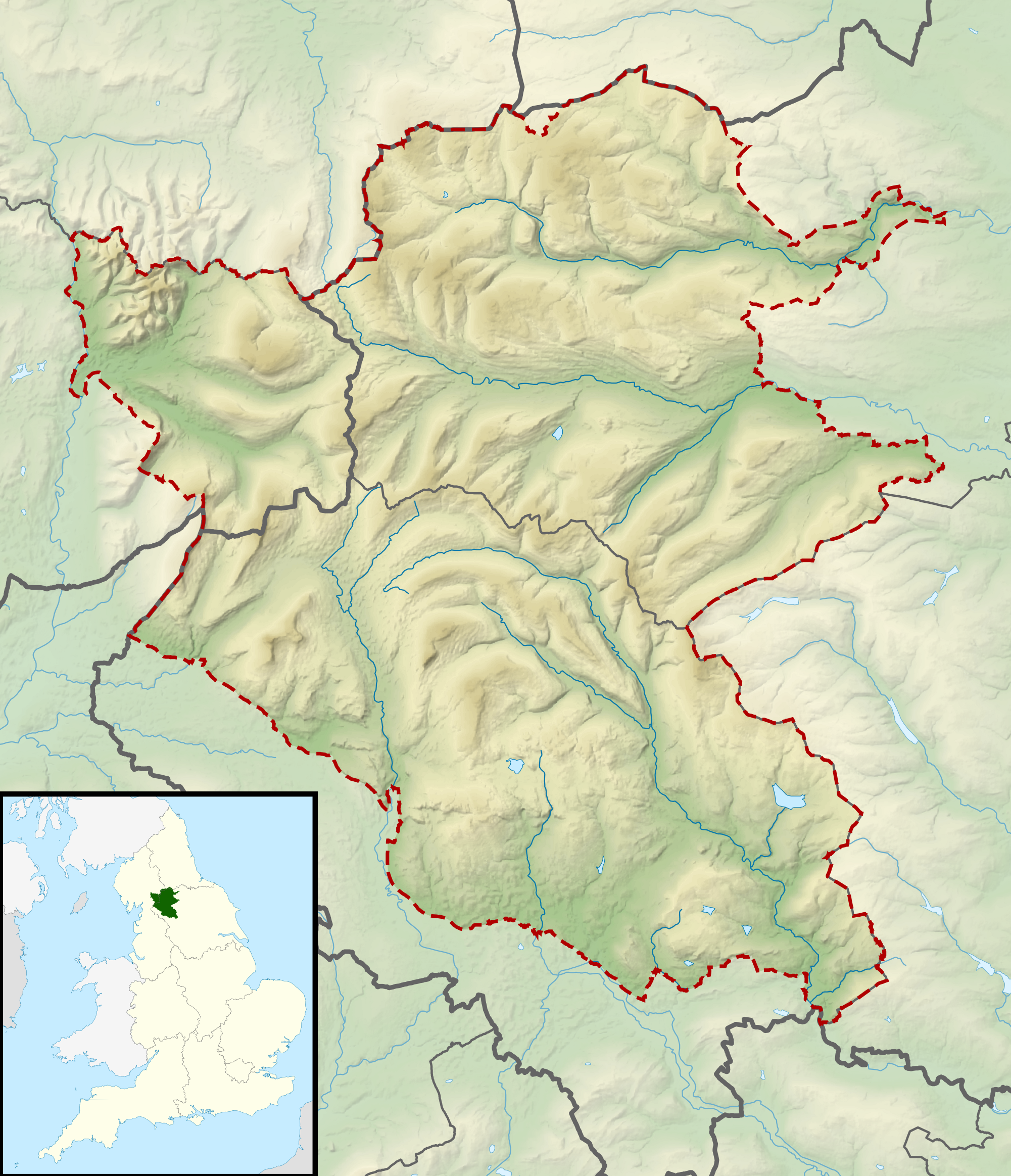
- Location within Yorkshire Dales
- Location: Cumbria, England
- Parent range: Southern Yorkshire Dales
- OS grid: SD7288

Aye Gill Pike is a Marilyn in the Yorkshire Dales, the highest point of the ridge of Rise Hill between Dentdale and Garsdale in Cumbria, England.
