= Ash Fell =

Protected area in Cumbria, England

Coordinates: 54.444243°N 2.3993411°W

Ash Fell is a Site of Special Scientific Interest (SSSI) in Cumbria, England. It is located within the Yorkshire Dales National Park 4km southwest of the town of Kirkby Stephen (2km southwest of Kirkby Stephen railway station). This area is protected because of the lowland dwarf-shrub heath habitat present. This protected area includes Wether Hill and Rasett Hill. The cairn at the top of Rasett Hill is a scheduled monument.

The boundaries of Ash Fell SSSI are contiguous with the boundaries of Smardale Gill SSSI and Ash Fell Edge SSSI, so is part of a larger area of nature protection.

== Biology ==
The main heathland is dominated by heather. Herbaceous plant species include tormentil and heath bedstraw. Moss species include Hypnum cupressiforme and Pleurozium schreberi. In wet heath, the moss species Aulocomnium palustre and the herbaceous species bog asphodel and lesser twayblade have been recorded.

Calcareous grassland also occurs in this protected area. Herbaceous species include limestone bedstraw, autumn gentian. Lesser clubmoss has also been recorded here. Moss species in limestone pavement include Rhacomitrium lanuginosum. Plants on wet areas on calcareous soils include common butterwort, marsh lousewort and bird's eye primrose.

Bird species recorded on Ash Fell include red grouse, curlew, lapwing and twite.

== Geology ==
The underlying rocks at Ash Fell are limestone and sandstone from the Carboniferous period.
