= Meugher =

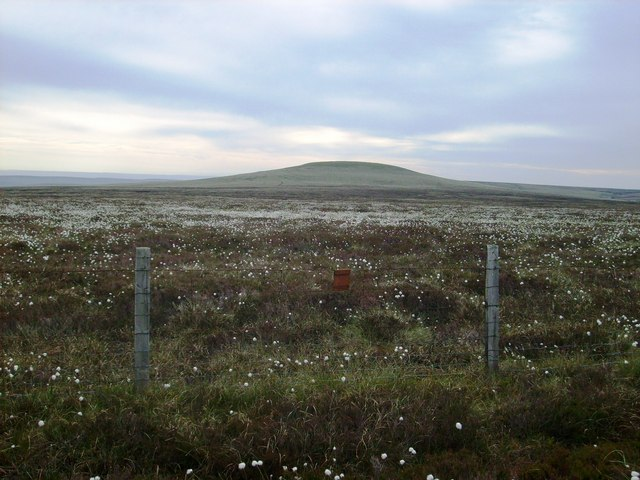
- Meugher from the west

Highest point
- Elevation: 575 m (1,886 ft)
- Prominence: 36 m (118 ft)
- Parent peak: Great Whernside
- Listing: Dewey
- Coordinates: 54°07′46.38″N 1°56′2.30″W

Geography
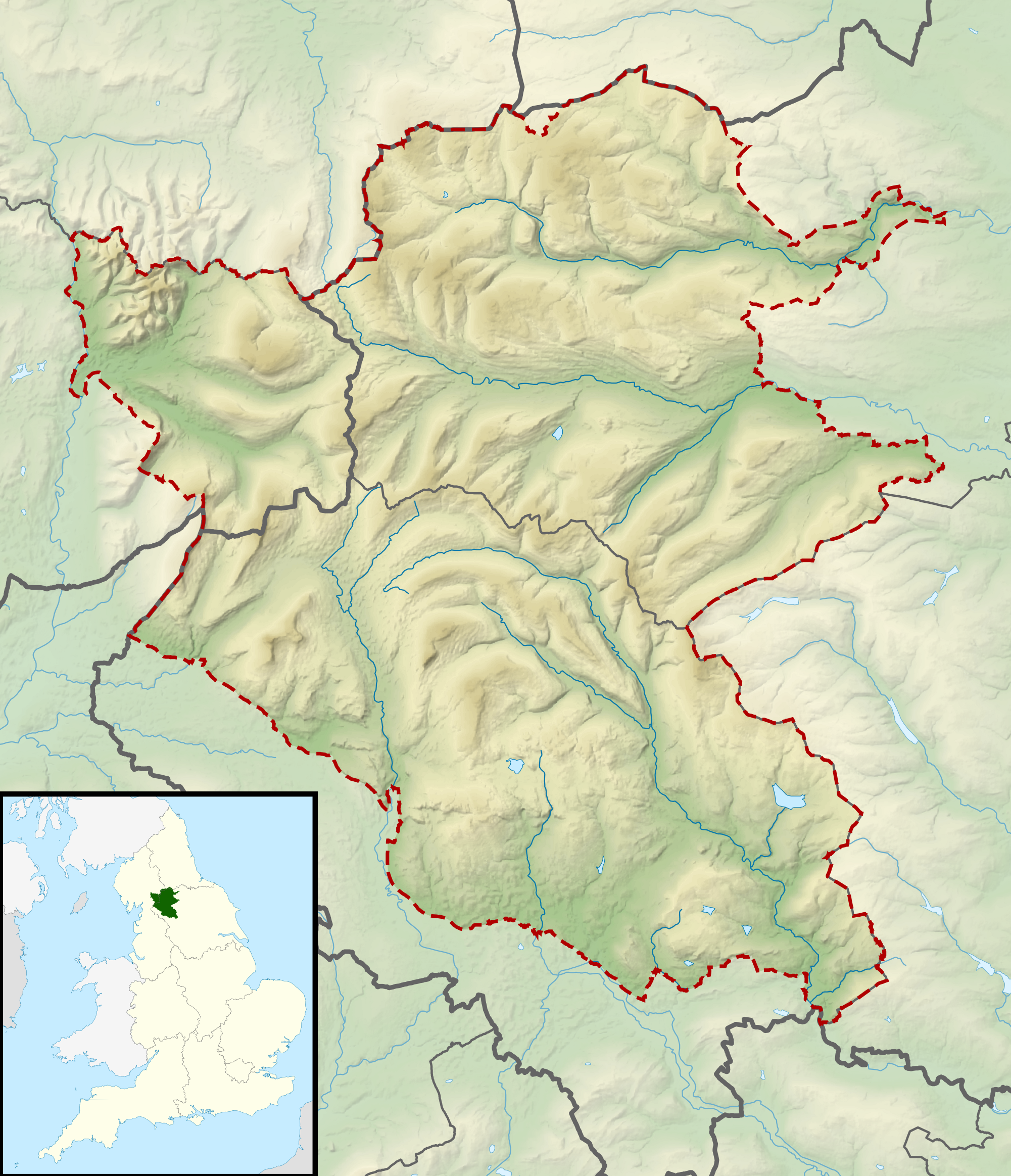
- Location within Yorkshire Dales
- Location: Yorkshire Dales, England
- OS grid: SE 0440 7042
- Topo map: OS Landranger 98

Meugher (/ˈmuːfər/ MOO-fər) is a hill in the Yorkshire Dales, England. It lies in remote country between Wharfedale and Nidderdale, in the parish of Stonebeck Down less than 1 kilometre (0.6 mi) outside the Yorkshire Dales National Park but within the Nidderdale Area of Outstanding Beauty. The hill has a conical peak topped by an Ordnance Survey triangulation pillar, and has been described as "perhaps the remotest and least inviting summit in the Yorkshire Dales". No public rights of way approach the summit, but since the Countryside and Rights of Way Act 2000 it has been on open access land. It can be accessed by a shooting track from near Lofthouse, which now approaches within 430 metres (470 yards) of the summit, or from a public footpath a mile north west of the summit, leading from Middlesmoor to Conistone.

Meugher is within the Nidderdale drainage area, with Meugher Dyke draining the southern flank, Back Stean Gill draining the eastern flank, and Cross Gill draining the western and northern flanks.

The name was first recorded as Magare in 1120, and probably derives from the Old Norse mjór haugr, meaning "small hill".
