= Birkett Hill and High Out Wood =

Site of Special Scientific Interest in Cumbria, England

Coordinates: 54.4606°N 2.3239°W

Birkett Hill and High Out Wood is a Site of Special Scientific Interest (SSSI) within North Pennines National Landscape in Cumbria, England. It is located 2km southeast of the town of Kirkby Stephen close to Ewbank Scar and includes an ancient woodland (High Out Wood) and a patch of grassland north of Ladthwaite Beck and a patch of grassland on the south of Ladthwaite Beck (Birkett Hill). This site is protected because of the species richness of the limestone grassland and because of the ancient woodland present.

== Biology ==
Plant species in limestone grassland include limestone bedstraw, wild thyme, harebell, fairy flax, common dog-violet, common rock-rose, alpine bistort, field gentian, mountain everlasting, moonwort, dark red-helleborine and bird's-eye primrose. Lesser clubmoss is also found in this grassland.

Insect species in the limestone grassland include the butterfly called the northern brown argus.

Tree species within High Oak Wood ancient woodland include ash, wych elm, birch and hazel, including coppiced hazel. Herbaceous species include devil's-bit scabious, wood sorrel, woodruff, sanicle, dog's mercury and wood anemone.

Fern species include lady-fern in the woodland and brittle-bladder fern in the limestone pavement.

Bird species recorded in this protected area include lapwing, redshank, curlew, redstart, spotted flycatcher, meadow pipit, wheatear, tawny owl, buzzard and golden plover.

== Geology ==
The rocks underlying Birkett Hill and High Out Wood include carboniferous limestone and sandstone with a thin band of shale between these layers. Landforms including limestone pavement and scree are present within this protected area.
