= Thorpe Fell Top =

Marilyn in North Yorkshire, England

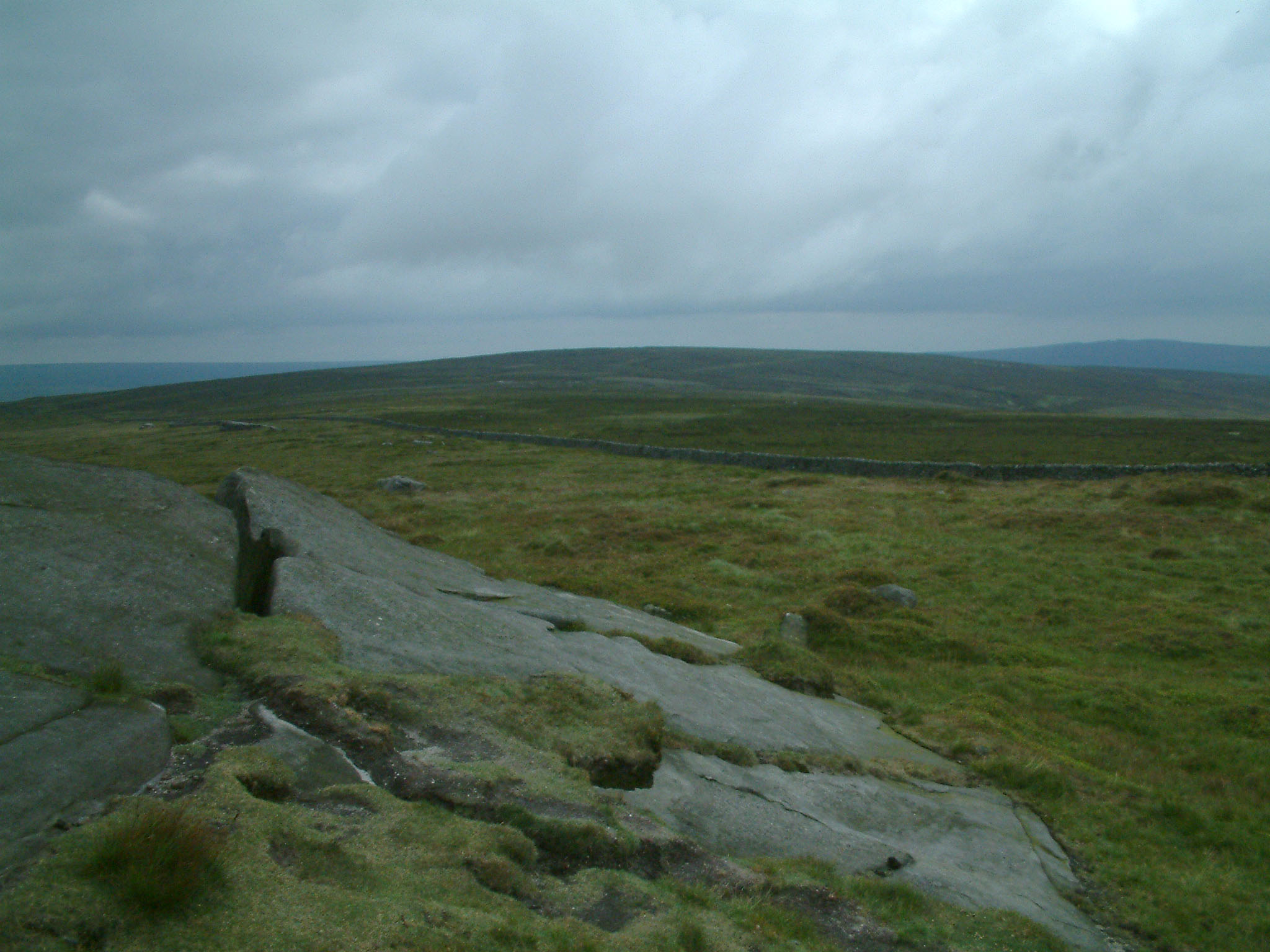
- Thorpe Fell Top from the summit of Cracoe Fell.

Highest point
- Elevation: 506 m (1,660 ft)
- Prominence: c. 308 m
- Parent peak: Whernside
- Listing: Marilyn
- Coordinates: 54°01′58″N 1°59′19″W

Geography
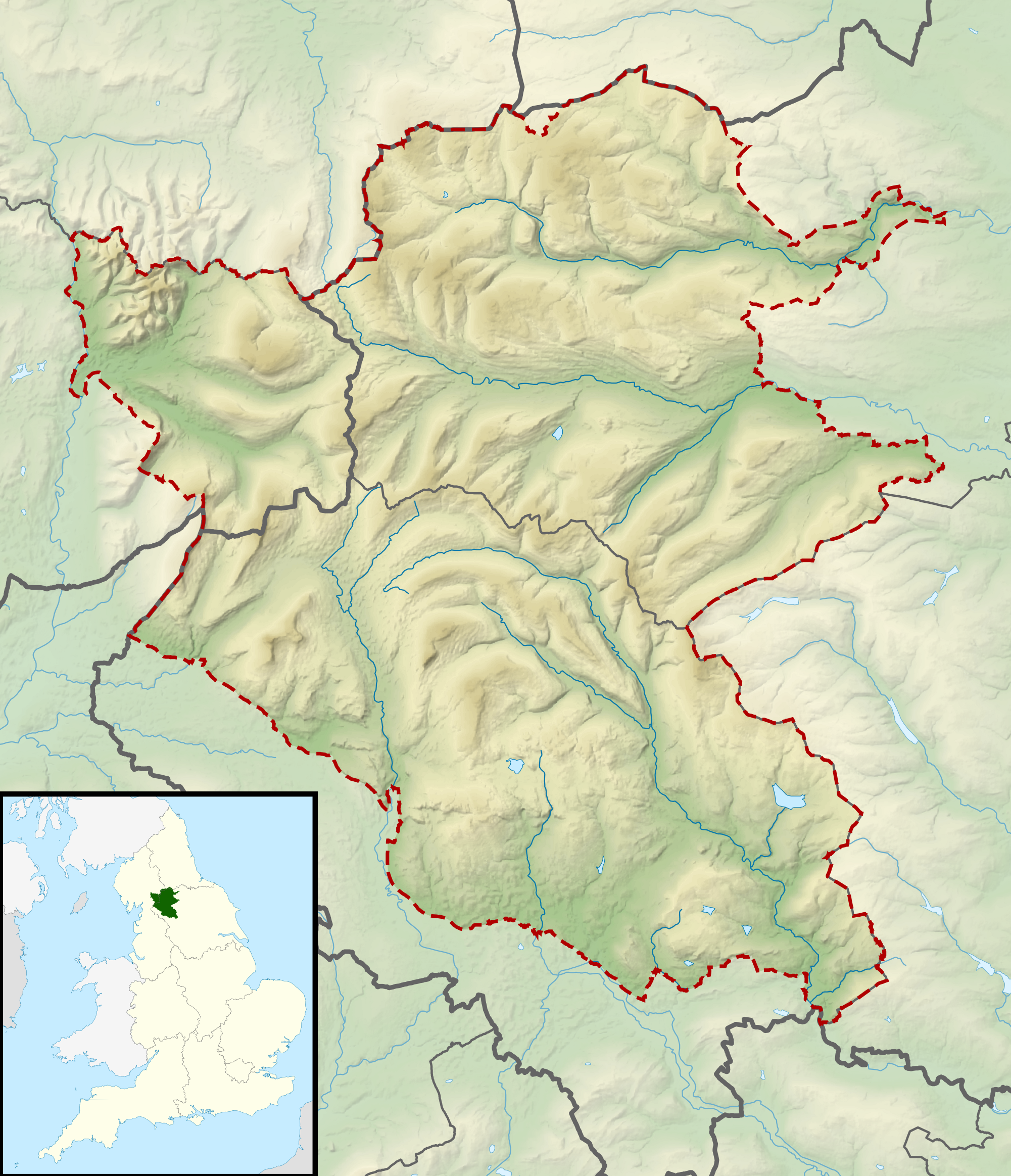
- Location within Yorkshire Dales
- Location: Yorkshire Dales, England
- OS grid: SE008596
- Topo map: OS Landranger 104

Thorpe Fell Top is the top of the hill of Burnsall and Thorpe Fell in the Yorkshire Dales, itself forming part of a larger wedge of ground between Wharfedale and Skipton.

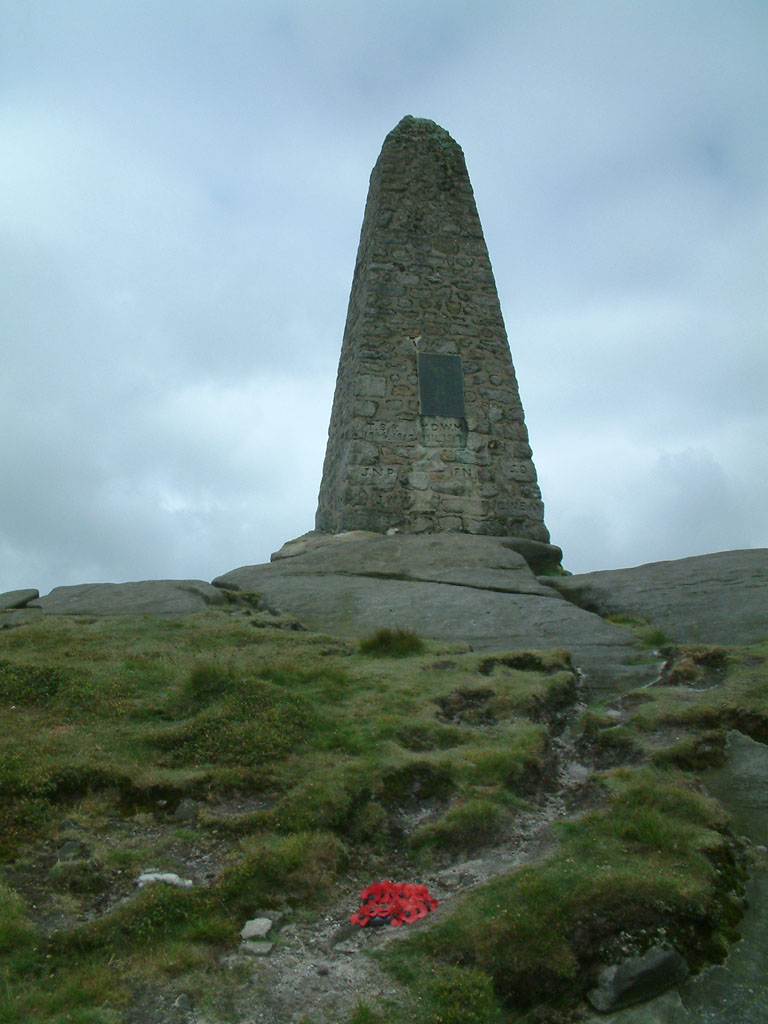
War memorial on nearby Cracoe Fell

The summit of this grouse moor is 506 metres (1,660 ft) above sea level and topped with a trig point. It was listed in Alan Dawson's "The Relative Hills of Britain" as a Marilyn. However, a number of recent observations and measurements suggest that the base of the war memorial at the top of Cracoe Fell (SD993588) some 1.1 mi (1.7 km) to the south-west, is probably higher, perhaps as high as 510 metres.

Thorpe Fell Top is probably most easily visited from either Thorpe or Burnsall. The track and path marked on Ordnance Survey maps to the north and west of the summit continues all the way to the top of Cracoe Fell. The latter can also be reached along Fell Lane from the village of Cracoe.
