= Yarlside =

Peak in the Yorkshire Dales, England

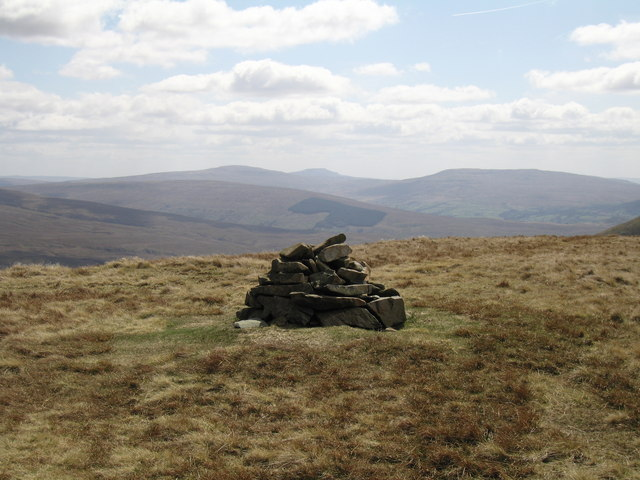
- The summit cairn of Yarlside

Highest point
- Elevation: 2,096 ft (639 m)
- Parent peak: The Calf
- Listing: Marilyn, Hewitt
- Coordinates: 54.3814°N 2.4861°W

Geography
- Location: Cumbria, England
- Parent range: Howgill Fells
- OS grid: SD685985
- Topo map: OS Landranger 098

Yarlside is a hill in the Howgill Fells, Cumbria (historically Westmorland), England.

This fell is not to be confused with the Yarlside area near Barrow-in-Furness, once served by the Yarlside Iron Mines tramway. That lies 33 miles (53 km) to the west. Nor should it be confused with Great Yarlside and Little Yarlside on the eastern fringes of the Lake District, 11 miles (18 km) to the northwest.
