= Great Shunner Fell =

Mountain in Cumbria, England

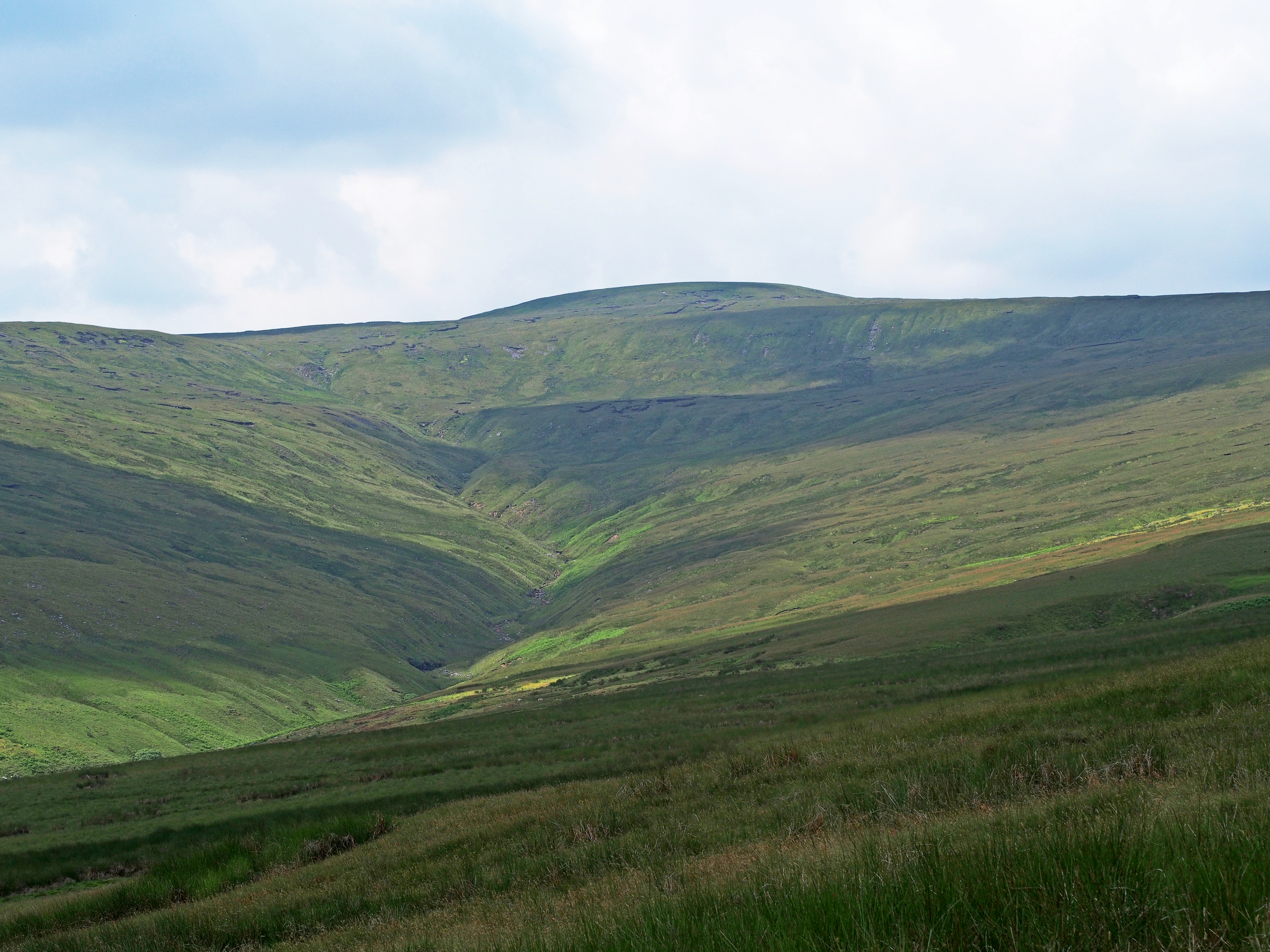
- Great Shunner Fell from the north-east

Highest point
- Elevation: 716 m (2,349 ft)
- Prominence: c. 297 m
- Parent peak: Cross Fell
- Listing: Marilyn, Hewitt, Nuttall
- Coordinates: 54°22′12″N 2°14′08″W

Geography
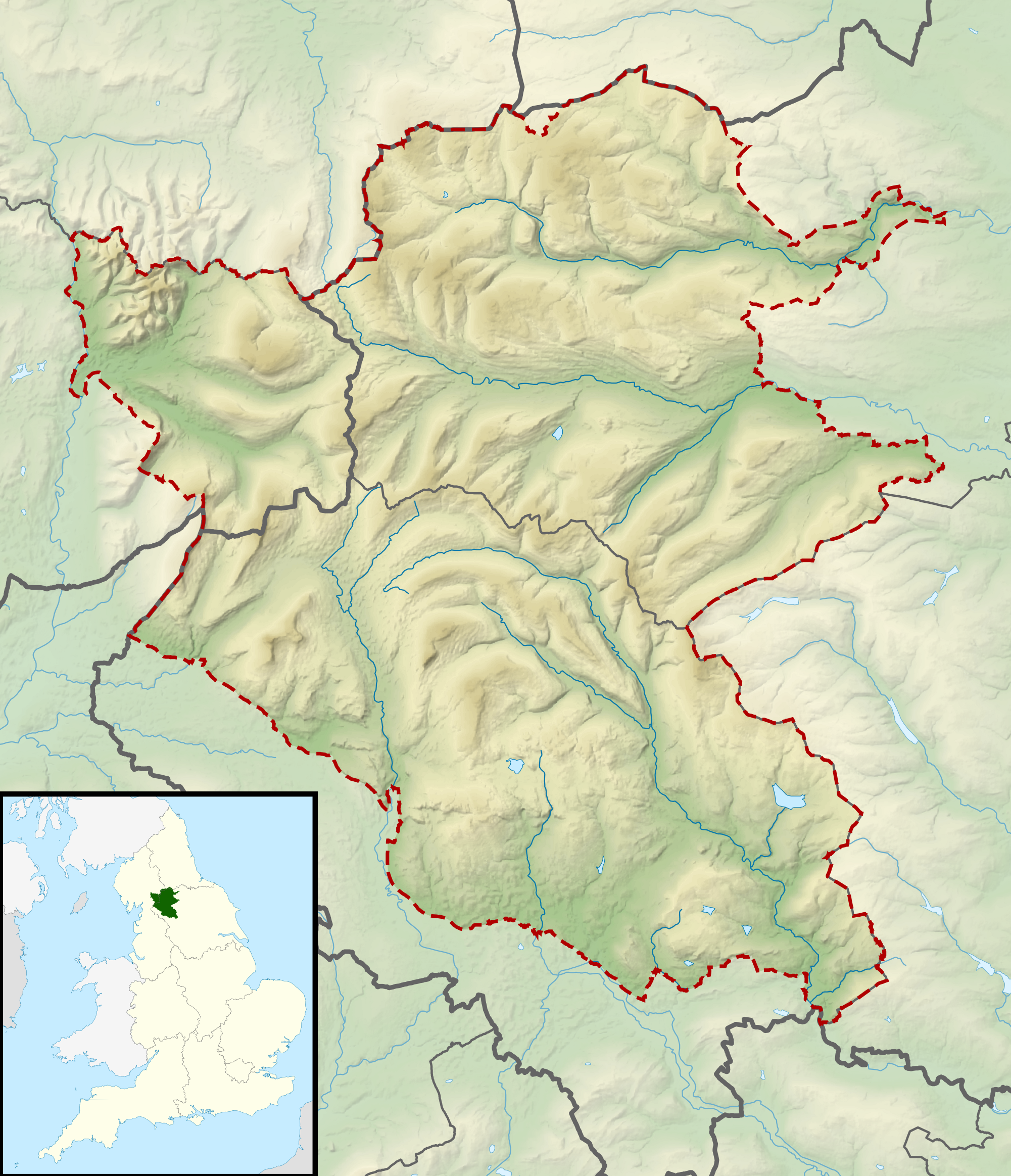
- Location within Yorkshire Dales
- Location: North Yorkshire, England
- Parent range: Yorkshire Dales
- OS grid: SD848972
- Topo map: OS Landranger 98

Great Shunner Fell is the third-highest mountain in the Yorkshire Dales, North Yorkshire, England, and the highest point in Wensleydale, at 716 metres above sea level. In clear weather the summit affords views of Wensleydale to the south, Ribblesdale to the southwest and Swaledale to the north, as well as views into Cumbria and County Durham beyond the A66.

The Pennine Way passes over its summit, on the way from Hawes to Keld. The popularity of this route had eroded vegetation from a strip 70 m wide across the moor, which has been alleviated since 1996 by the construction of a path made of flagstones.

The summit holds a cross-shaped windbreak of which the triangulation pillar has been built into the northern 'arm'.

Great Sleddale Beck, which becomes the River Swale after its confluence with Birkdale Beck, has its sources on the northern slopes of Great Shunner Fell, while the southern slopes drain into the River Ure and Wensleydale.

The dominating rock type in the area is limestone, but millstone grit outcrops extensively on Great Shunner Fell, and coal seams have also been worked on its slopes.

Great Shunner Fell is the most southerly remaining outpost in Great Britain for the yellow marsh saxifrage, Saxifraga hirculus.

== Gallery ==
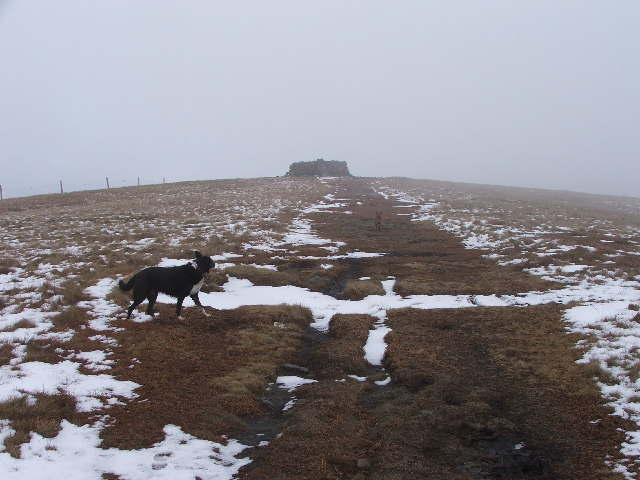
The last few yards to the summit

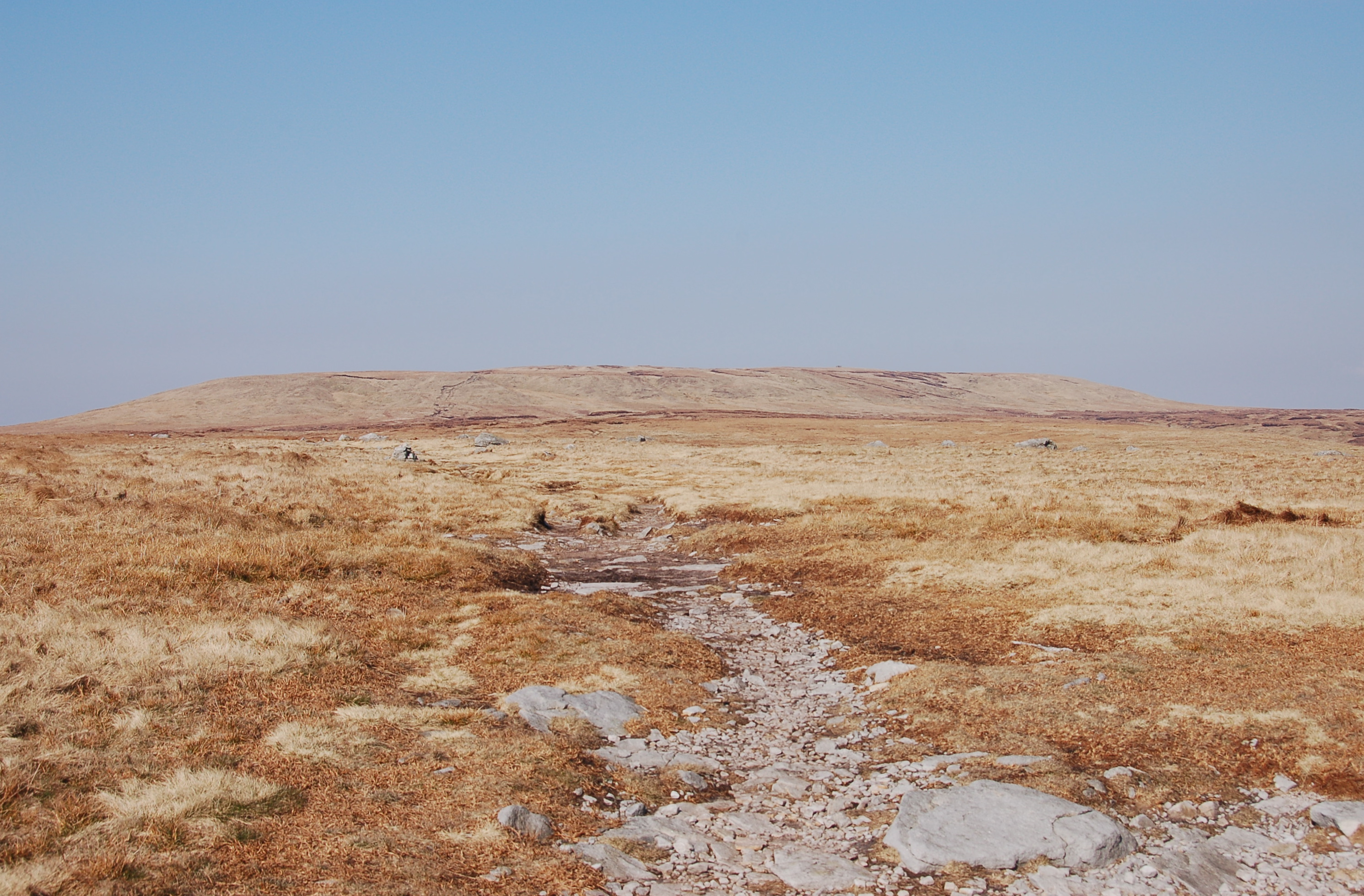
The summit plateau of Great Shunner Fell viewed from the south

== See also ==
- List of peaks in the Yorkshire Dales
