= Pendle Borough Council elections =

Local government elections in Lancashire, England

Pendle Borough Council elections are generally held three years out of every four, with a third of the council elected each time. Pendle Borough Council is the local authority for the non-metropolitan district of Pendle in Lancashire, England. Since the last boundary changes in 2020, 33 councillors have been elected from 12 wards.

== Council elections ==
Year	Conservative	Labour	Liberal Democrats	British National Party	Reform	Independent	Notes
1973							
1976							New ward boundaries.
1979							
1980							
1982							
1983							
1984							
1986							
1987							Borough boundary changes took place but the number of seats remained the same.
1988	5	19	27	0	-	0	
1990	5	22	23	0	-	1	
1991	5	26	20	0	-	0	
1992	7	27	17	0	-	0	
1994	7	23	21	0	-	0	
1995	5	20	26	0	-	0	
1996	3	19	29	0	-	0	
1998	3	18	29	0	-	1	
1999	7	20	23	0	-	1	
2000	9	24	18	0	-	0	
2002	11	19	19	0	-	0	New ward boundaries.
2003	11	15	23	0	-	0	
2004	11	8	30	0	-	0	
2006	13	5	30	1	-	0	
2007	14	6	27	1	-	0	
2008	16	10	20	2	-	1	
2010	17	13	16	2	-	1	
2011	18	16	12	2	-	1	
2012	18	18	12	1	-	0	
2014	19	18	11	1	-	0	
2015	19	18	11	1	-	0	
2016	21	17	10	1	-	0	
2018	24	15	9	0	-	0	
2019	21	16	10	0	-	1	
2021	18	10	5	0	-	0	New ward boundaries.
2022	17	11	5	0	0	0	
2023	14	11	7	0	0	1 (Note: Elected as Labour.)	
2024	13	0	8	0	0	12	
2026	8	0	7	0	5	13	

== Borough result maps ==
2002 results map

2003 results map

2004 results map

2006 results map

2007 results map

2008 results map

2010 results map

2011 results map

2012 results map

2014 results map

2015 results map

2016 results map

2018 results map

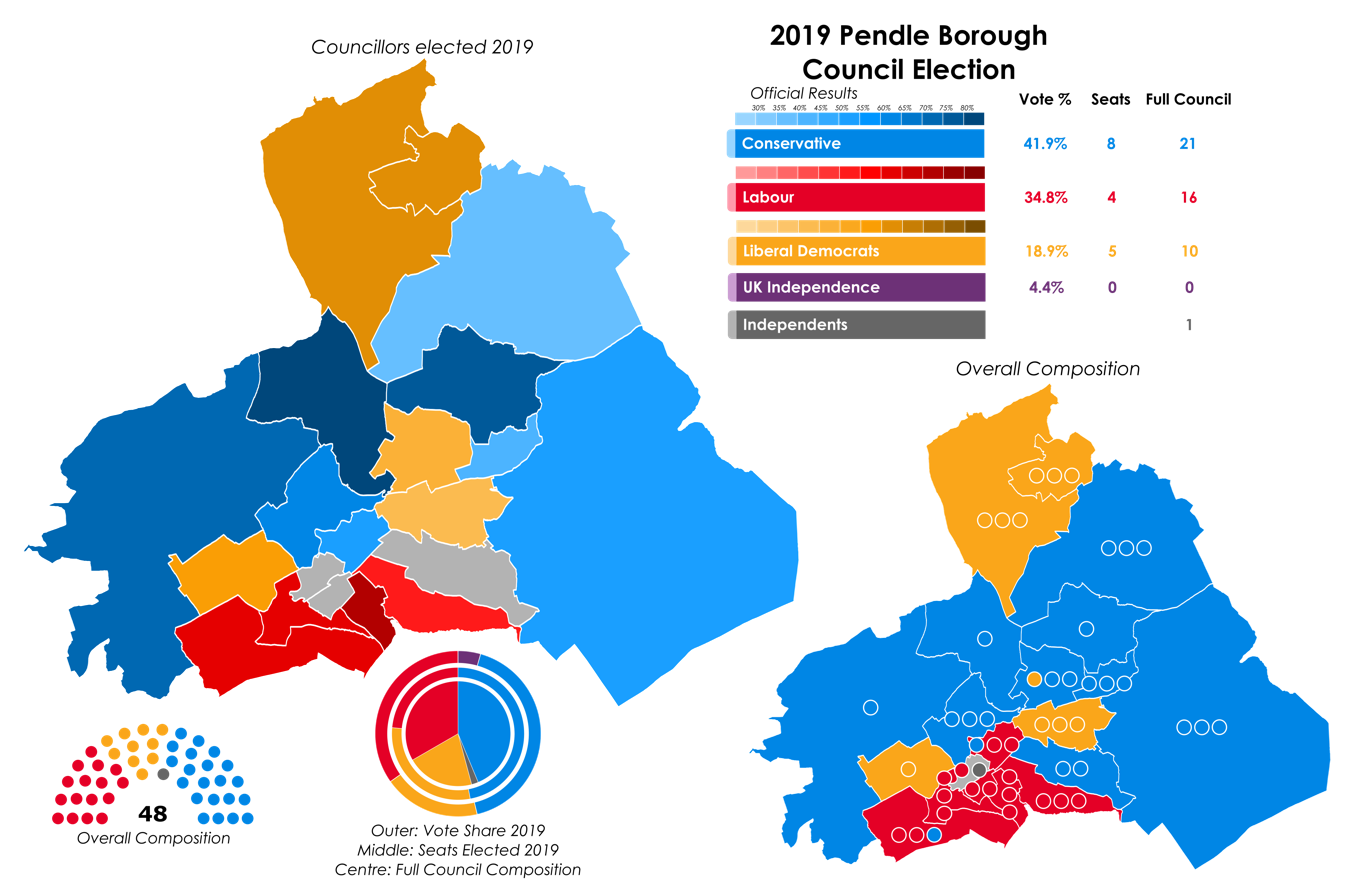
2019 results map

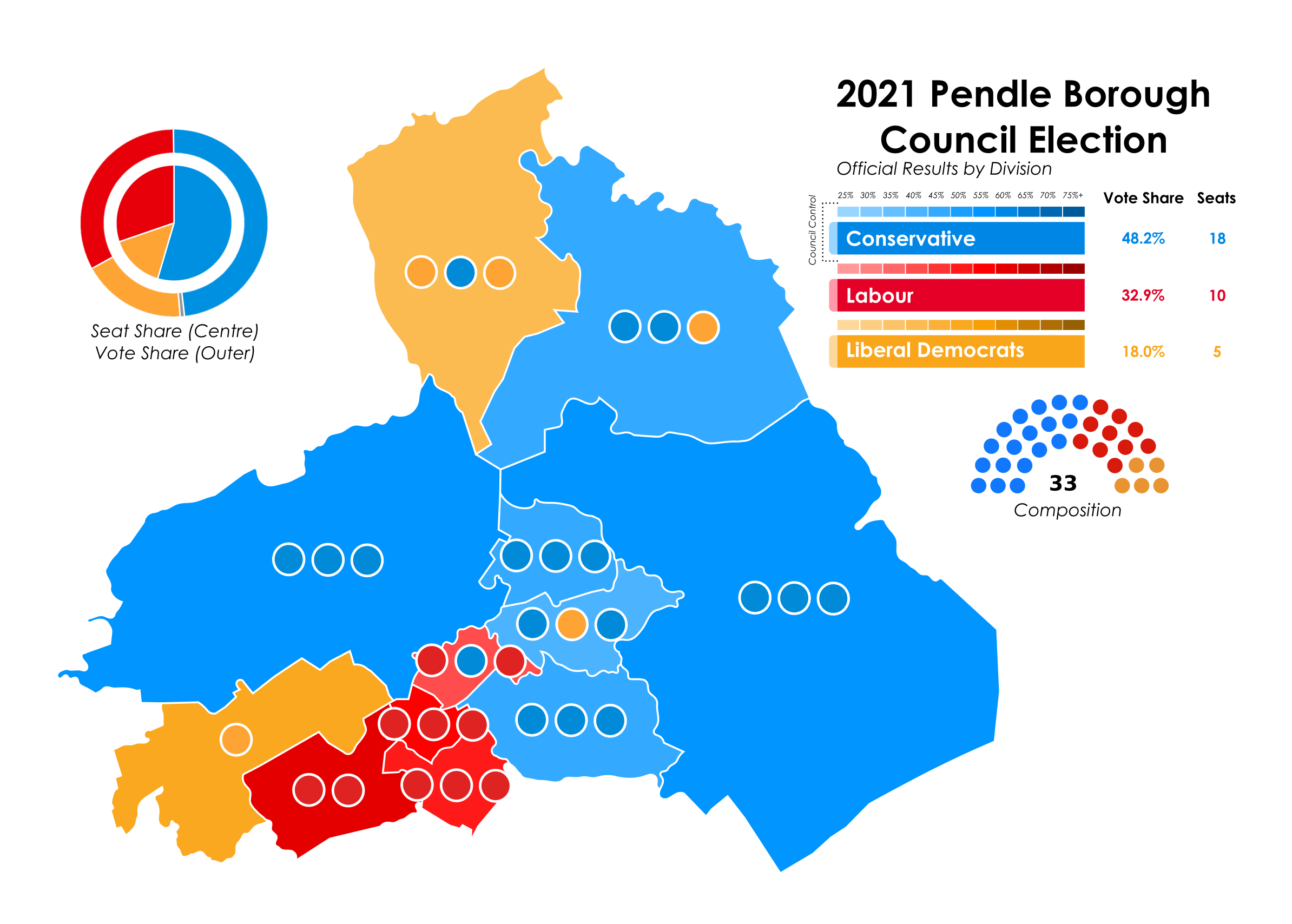
2021 results map

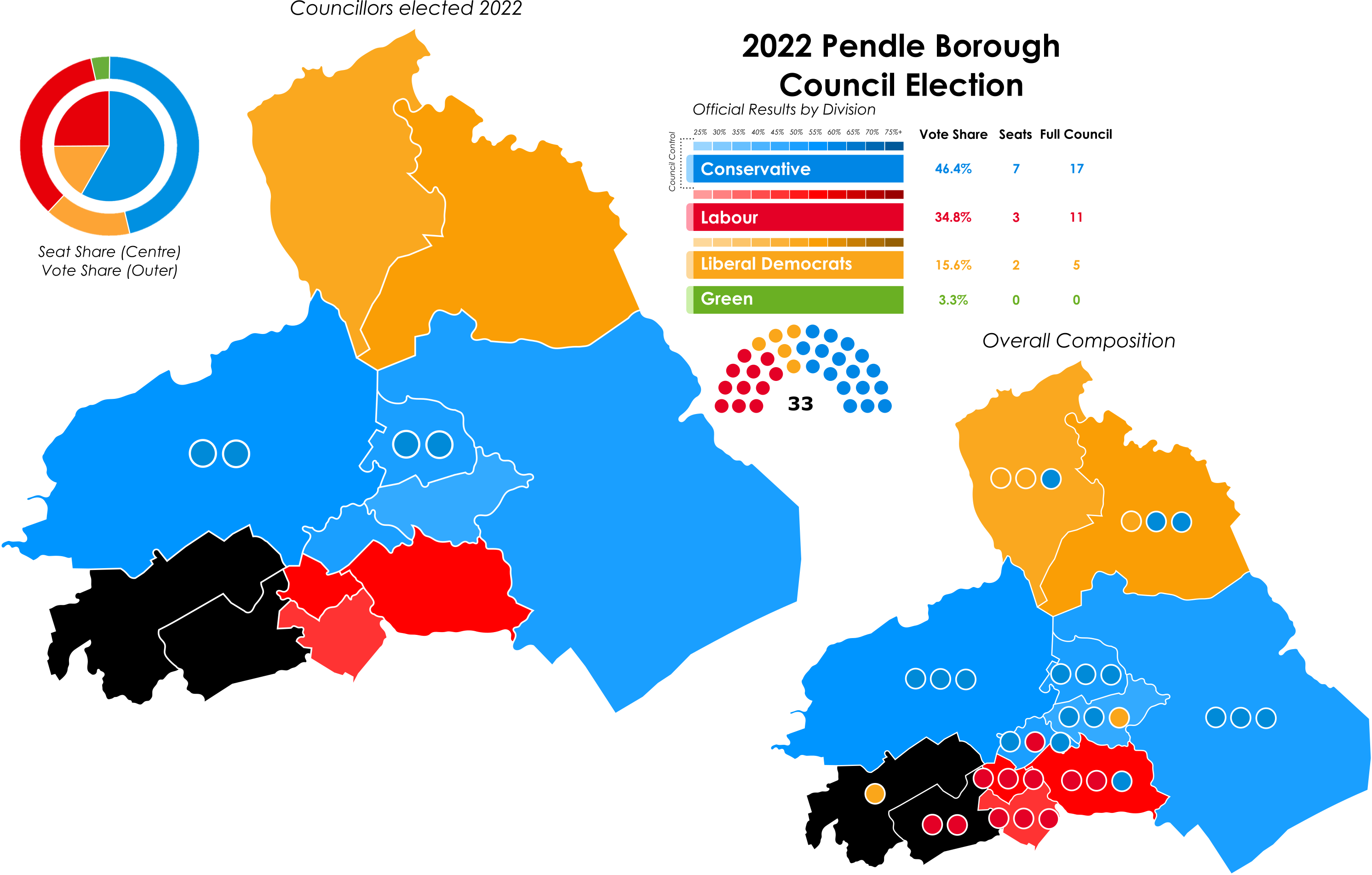
2022 results map

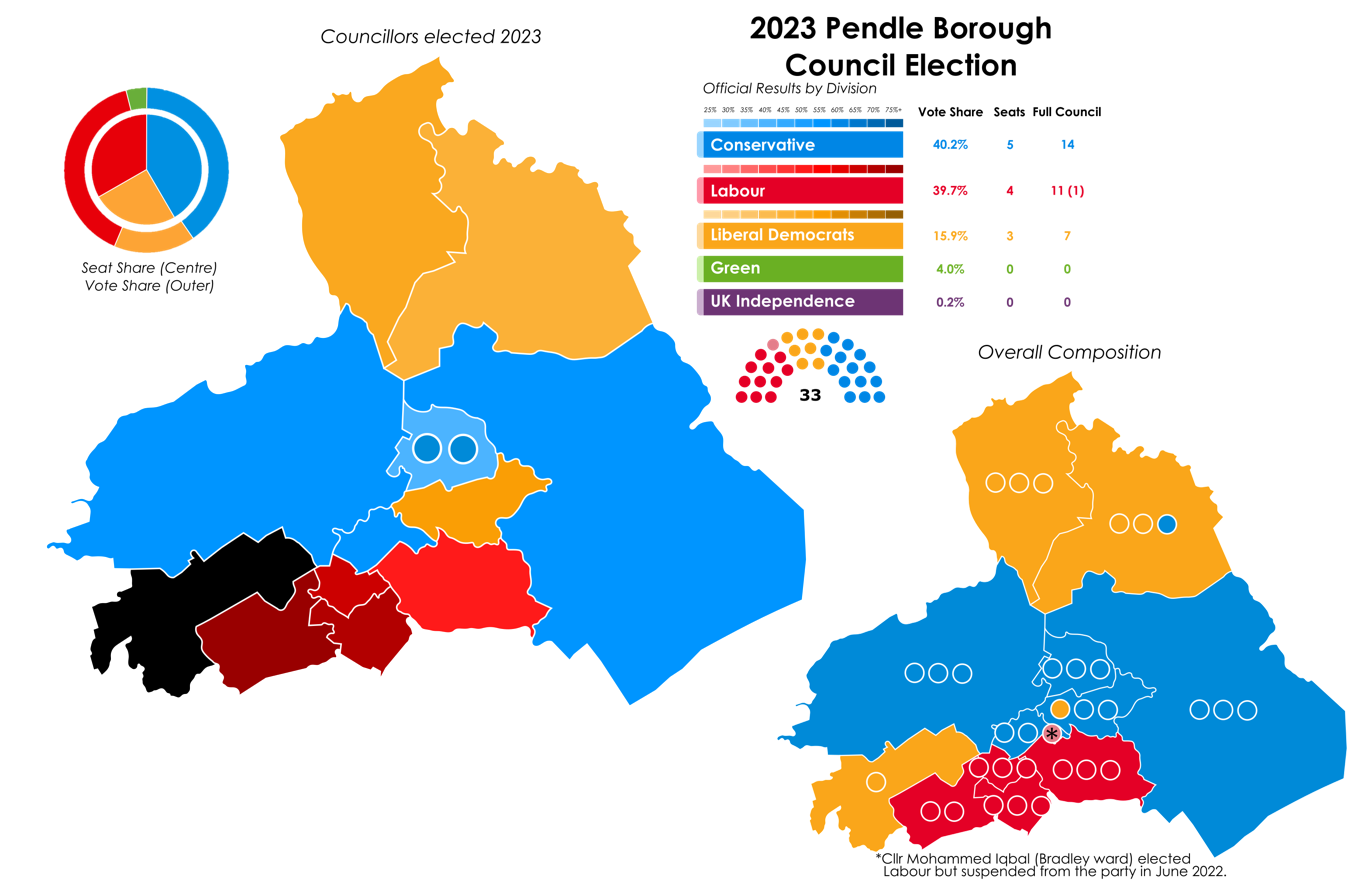
2023 results map

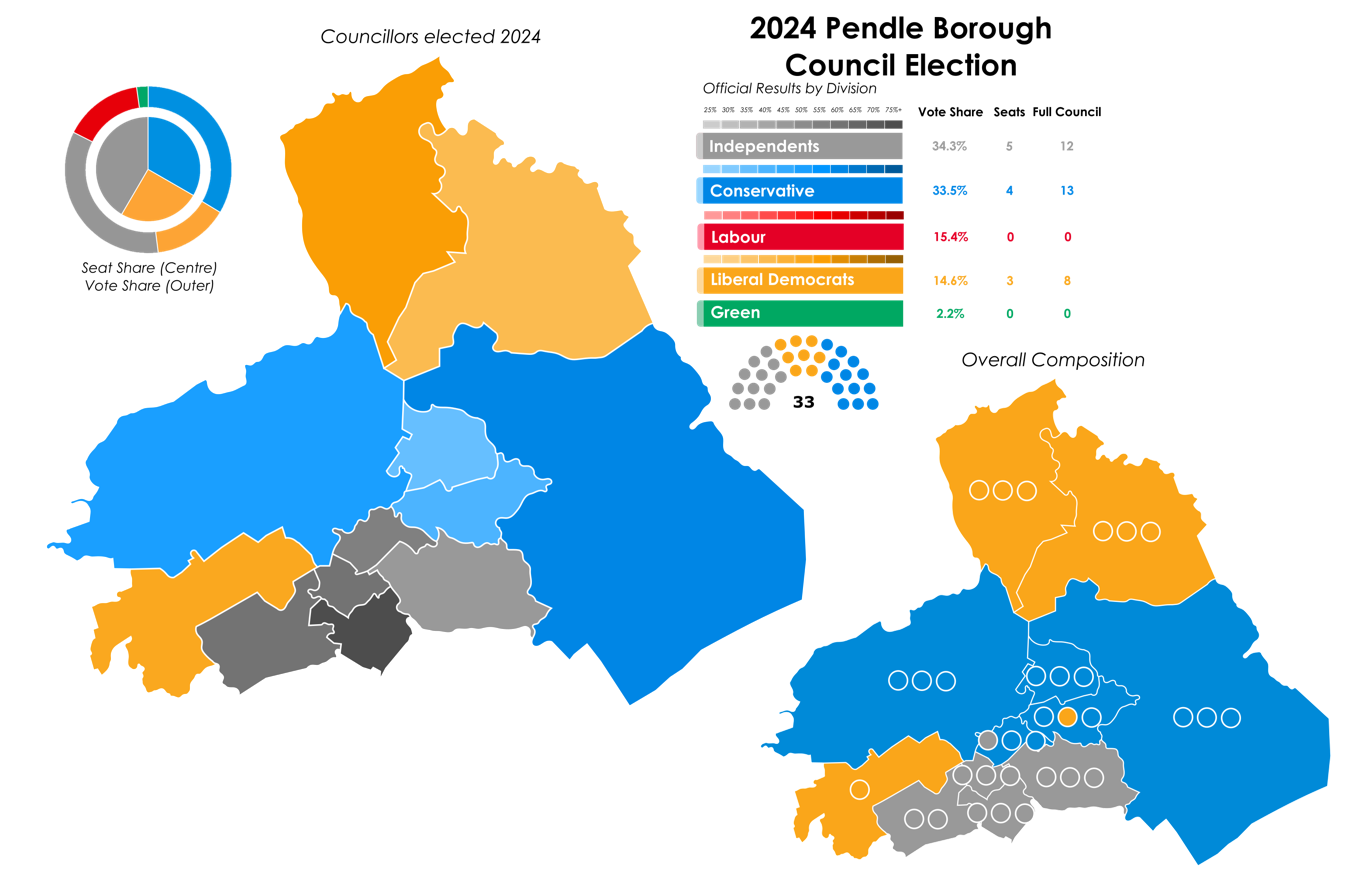
2024 results map

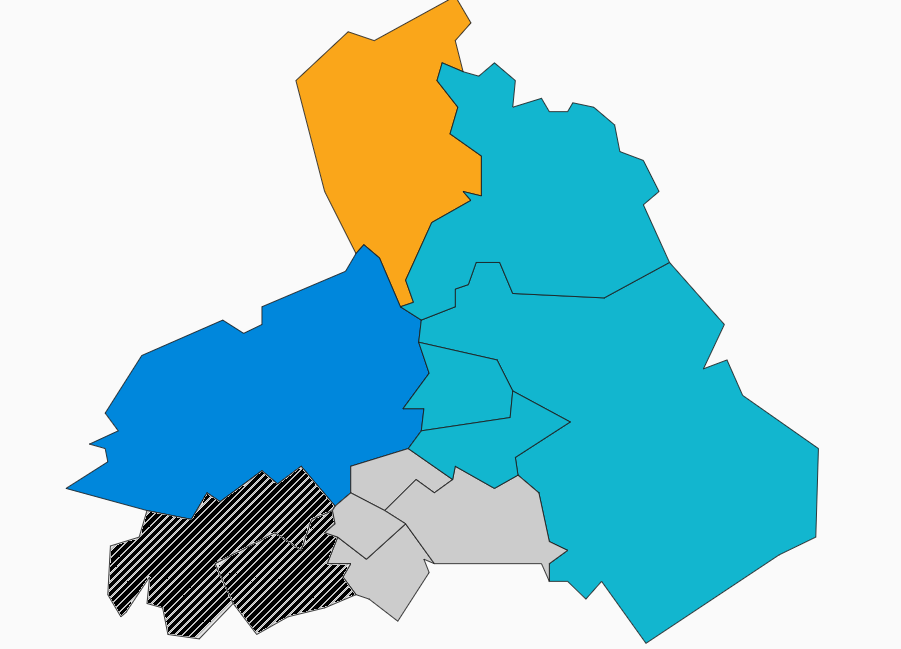
2026 results map

== By-election results ==
By-elections occur when seats become vacant between council elections. Below is a summary of recent by-elections; full by-election results can be found by clicking on the by-election name.

By-election	Date	Incumbent party	Winning party
Barnoldswick Coates	27 June 1996	Liberal Democrats	Liberal Democrats
Barnoldswick Craven	27 June 1996	Liberal Democrats	Liberal Democrats
Bradley	20 March 1997	Labour	Labour
Marsden	7 August 1997	Labour	Labour
Horsfield by-election	10 December 1998	Labour	Liberal Democrats
Horsfield by-election	1 March 2001	Labour	Liberal Democrats
Craven by-election	28 June 2007	Liberal Democrats	Liberal Democrats
Coates by-election	2 May 2013	Liberal Democrats	Liberal Democrats
Blacko and Higherford by-election	3 April 2014	Conservative	Conservative
Old Laund Booth by-election	3 July 2014	Liberal Democrats	Liberal Democrats
Reedley by-election	24 November 2016	Labour	Conservative
Barrowford and Pendleside by-election	15 December 2022	Conservative	Conservative
Vivary Bridge by-election	6 March 2025	Conservative	Liberal Democrats
Vivary Bridge by-election	1 May 2025	Conservative	Reform
Barnoldswick by-election	27 November 2025	Liberal Democrats	Liberal Democrats
