= 2014 Pendle Borough Council election =

2014 UK local government election

Map of the results of the 2014 Pendle Borough Council election. Labour in red, Conservatives in blue, Liberal Democrats in yellow and British National Party in dark blue. Wards in dark grey were not contested in 2014.

The 2014 Pendle Borough Council election took place on 22 May 2014 to elect members of Pendle Borough Council in Lancashire, England. One third of the council was up for election and the council stayed under no overall control.

After the election, the composition of the council was

- Conservative 19
- Labour 18
- Liberal Democrats 11
- British National Party 1

As of 2024, this was the last election in which a British National Party candidate was elected.

== Background ==
Before the election the Conservatives had 19 councillors, the most for the party on the council for the previous 30 years, while Labour had 17 councillors, the Liberal Democrats had 12 and there was 1 British National Party councillor. This was a change from the situation at the last election in 2012, after Labour councillor Abdul Aziz had defected to the Conservatives in September 2013 after having been suspended by Labour. The council was run by the Conservatives, with support from the Liberal Democrats.

16 seats were contested at the election, with Labour defending 6 seats, the Conservatives 5, Liberal Democrats 4 and the British National Party 1. Among those defending seats at the election was the leader of the Labour group on the council, Mohammed Iqbal in Bradley ward.

During the campaign Pendle was visited by the Conservative Prime Minister David Cameron, both the Labour deputy leader Harriet Harman and the shadow chancellor Ed Balls, and the Liberal Democrat Chief Secretary to the Treasury Danny Alexander to support their respective parties.

== Election result ==
There was little change in the party composition of the council with Labour gaining one seat from the Conservatives, while the Conservatives took one seat from the Liberal Democrats. Labour's gain came in Reedley, where Yasser Iqbal defeated the Conservative councillor for the previous 40 years, Pauline McCormick, by 36 votes. However Conservative Lyle Davy became the youngest councillor in the country at the age of 18 after taking Coates from the Liberal Democrats by 49 votes, after the Liberal Democrats had held the ward for the previous 16 years. Meanwhile, Brian Parker held Marsden for the British National Party by 6 votes over the Conservatives, in the only seat won by the British National Party at the 2014 United Kingdom local elections. Overall turnout at the election was 38.82%.

Following the election Conservative Joe Cooney continued as leader of the council after the Conservatives and Liberal Democrats reached an agreement, with the Conservatives taking 6 seats on the council executive, while the Liberal Democrats took 4 seats on the executive.

Pendle local election result 2014
Party	Seats	Gains	Losses	Net gain/loss	Seats %	Votes %	Votes	+/−
Labour	7	1	0	+1	43.8	39.1	9,375	-1.1%
Conservative	5	1	1	0	31.3	29.6	7,099	-0.3%
Liberal Democrats	3	0	1	-1	18.8	19.6	4,701	-3.4%
BNP	1	0	0	0	6.3	2.1	493	-0.7%
UKIP	0	0	0	0	0	7.3	1,758	+6.5%
The Blue Party	0	0	0	0	0	1.9	466	+1.9%
TUSC	0	0	0	0	0	0.3	64	+0.3%

== Ward results ==
=== Barrowford ===
Barrowford
Party	Candidate	Votes	%	±%
Conservative	Christopher Jowett	716	44.8	−15.3
Labour	Mark Porter	361	22.6	−17.3
UKIP	Mick Waddington	325	20.4	+20.4
Liberal Democrats	Gavin Roper	195	12.2	+12.2
Majority		355	22.2	+2.0
Turnout		1,597	39.8	+1.8
Conservative hold		Swing		

=== Boulsworth ===
Boulsworth
Party	Candidate	Votes	%	±%
Conservative	Sarah Cockburn-Price	647	44.1	
UKIP	Graham Cannon	359	24.5	
Labour	Robert Oliver	261	17.8	
Liberal Democrats	Heather Greaves	201	13.7	
Majority		288	19.6	
Turnout		1,468	34.7	+2.1
Conservative hold		Swing		

=== Bradley ===
Bradley
Party	Candidate	Votes	%	±%
Labour	Mohammed Iqbal	1,218	67.2	+12.2
UKIP	Tony Leather	350	19.3	+19.3
Conservative	Bernard Variyam	151	8.3	+1.4
Liberal Democrats	Irfan Ahmed	93	5.1	−27.6
Majority		868	47.9	+25.6
Turnout		1,812	39.0	−6.9
Labour hold		Swing		

=== Brierfield ===
Brierfield
Party	Candidate	Votes	%	±%
Labour	Mohammed Arshad	1,142	72.8	+4.9
Conservative	Mohammed Abdullah	354	22.6	−9.5
Liberal Democrats	Nadeem Akbar	73	4.7	+4.7
Majority		788	50.2	+14.3
Turnout		1,569	44.2	−0.1
Labour hold		Swing		

=== Clover Hill ===
Clover Hill
Party	Candidate	Votes	%	±%
Labour	Kathleen Shore	660	53.1	−8.1
UKIP	Ben Robinson	309	24.8	+24.8
Conservative	Janice Taylor	203	16.3	−4.0
Liberal Democrats	Waseem Asghar	72	5.8	−2.0
Majority		351	28.2	−12.7
Turnout		1,244	33.2	−3.3
Labour hold		Swing		

=== Coates ===
Coates
Party	Candidate	Votes	%	±%
Conservative	Lyle Davy	700	43.5	+15.2
Liberal Democrats	Lindsay Gaskell	651	40.4	−14.8
Labour	Lynn Harrison	170	10.6	−6.0
The Blue Party	Kieron Hartley	89	5.5	+5.5
Majority		49	3.0	
Turnout		1,610	38.9	+7.2
Conservative gain from Liberal Democrats		Swing		

=== Craven ===
Craven
Party	Candidate	Votes	%	±%
Liberal Democrats	David Whipp	761	49.5	+5.7
Conservative	Mike Thompson	352	22.9	−3.9
UKIP	Dorothy Baxter	261	17.0	+3.3
Labour	Denzil Metcalfe	140	9.1	−6.6
The Blue Party	Natasha Harris	24	1.6	+1.6
Majority		409	26.6	+9.6
Turnout		409	35.6	+3.1
Liberal Democrats hold		Swing		

=== Earby ===
Earby
Party	Candidate	Votes	%	±%
Conservative	Mike Goulthorp	734	41.6	+0.3
Labour	David Byrne	453	25.7	+5.0
The Blue Party	James Jackman	353	20.0	+20.0
Liberal Democrats	Doris Haigh	226	12.8	−7.1
Majority		281	15.9	−4.8
Turnout		1,766	36.7	+1.2
Conservative hold		Swing		

=== Horsfield ===
Horsfield
Party	Candidate	Votes	%	±%
Conservative	Neil Butterworth	619	47.2	+6.8
Labour	Malcolm Birks	372	28.4	−1.0
Liberal Democrats	James Kerrigan	320	24.4	−5.9
Majority		247	18.8	+8.7
Turnout		1,311	33.9	+1.0
Conservative hold		Swing		

=== Marsden ===
Marsden
Party	Candidate	Votes	%	±%
BNP	Brian Parker	339	37.9	+2.7
Conservative	Neil McGowan	333	29.1	−8.4
Labour	Yvonne Tennant	201	18.7	−12.7
UKIP	Christine Stables	154	14.3	N/A
Majority		6	8.8	−0.2
Turnout		1,073	42.1	+3.3
BNP hold		Swing		

=== Reedley ===
Reedley
Party	Candidate	Votes	%	±%
Labour	Yasser Iqbal	1,170	48.4	−0.1
Conservative	Pauline McCormick	1,133	46.9	+3.9
TUSC	Jackie Grunsell	64	2.6	+2.6
Liberal Democrats	Kamran Anwar	49	2.0	−6.5
Majority		37	1.5	−4.0
Turnout		2,416	56.6	+6.5
Labour gain from Conservative		Swing		

=== Southfield ===
Southfield
Party	Candidate	Votes	%	±%
Labour	Mohammed Anmer	769	54.8	−13.9
Conservative	Saanval Safir	394	28.1	+12.7
Liberal Democrats	James Wood	240	17.1	+1.2
Majority		375	26.7	−26.1
Turnout		1,403	34.6	+4.5
Labour hold		Swing		

=== Vivary Bridge ===
Vivary Bridge
Party	Candidate	Votes	%	±%
Liberal Democrats	David Clegg	565	41.8	+11.6
Conservative	Glenn Stock	319	23.6	−6.7
Labour	Russell Tennant	313	23.2	−8.8
BNP	John Rowe	154	11.4	+11.4
Majority		246	18.2	
Turnout		1,351	31.6	+2.7
Liberal Democrats hold		Swing		

=== Walverden ===
Walverden
Party	Candidate	Votes	%	±%
Labour	Julie Henderson	751	59.1	−15.6
Liberal Democrats	Asghar Ali	341	26.9	+26.9
Conservative	Peter Wilson	178	14.0	−11.3
Majority		410	32.3	−17.1
Turnout		1,270	46.2	+6.7
Labour hold		Swing		

=== Waterside ===
Waterside
Party	Candidate	Votes	%	±%
Liberal Democrats	Dorothy Lord	720	60.9	+13.3
Labour	David Johns	286	24.2	−4.8
Conservative	Jonny Nixon	177	15.0	+5.7
Majority		434	36.7	+18.0
Turnout		1,183	31.5	+0.8
Liberal Democrats hold		Swing		

=== Whitefield ===
Whitefield
Party	Candidate	Votes	%	±%
Labour	Asjad Mahmood	997	77.9	+43.2
Liberal Democrats	Imran Waheed	194	15.2	−46.8
Conservative	Margaret Beckett	89	7.0	+3.7
Majority		803	62.7	
Turnout		1,280	47.7	−18.2
Labour hold		Swing		

== By-elections between 2014 and 2015 ==
A by-election was held in Old Laund Booth ward on 3 July 2014 after the Liberal Democrat former leader of the council, John David, resigned from the council due to ill health after having held the seat since 1986. The seat was held for the Liberal Democrats by Brian Newman with a majority of 161 votes.

Old Laund Booth by-election 3 July 2014
Party	Candidate	Votes	%	±%
Liberal Democrats	Brian Newman	427	58.3	+9.8
Conservative	Jill Hartley	266	36.3	−10.9
UKIP	Michael Waddington	27	3.7	+3.7
The Blue Party	Kieron Hartley	13	1.8	+1.8
Majority		161	22.0	+20.7
Turnout		733	59.7	−1.6
Liberal Democrats hold		Swing		
