= 2002 Pendle Borough Council election =

2002 UK local government election

Map of the results of the 2002 Pendle Borough Council election. Liberal Democrats in yellow, Labour in red and Conservatives in blue.

The 2002 Pendle Borough Council election took place on 2 May 2002 to elect members of Pendle Borough Council in Lancashire, England. The whole council was up for election with boundary changes since the last election in 2000 reducing the number of seats by 2. The council stayed under no overall control.

== Background ==
After the 2000 election Labour was the largest party with 23 of the 51 seats, compared to 19 for the Liberal Democrats and 9 Conservatives. In the early part of 2002 however the gap between Labour and the Liberal Democrats narrowed after Labour councillor Kathleen Shore defected to the Liberal Democrats.

The whole council was being elected in 2002 for the first time since 1976 after boundary changes. These changes meant 49 seats were contested from 20 wards, with new wards of Blacko and Higherford, Higham and Pendleside and Old Laund Booth being created.

== Campaign ==
In total 144 candidates stood in the election with the Labour, Liberal Democrat and Conservative parties standing in most wards, along with 2 candidates from the Socialist Alliance and some independents. Several councillors stood down at the election, including Conservative group leader Roy Clarkson, Liberal Democrat former mayors Ian Gilhespy and Gill Gilhespy and Labour's Tim Ormrod, while Liberal Democrat Lord Tony Greaves stood for the party in Walverden ward.

Issues in the election included the handling of proposals for closing residential homes, the proposed demolition of houses in Nelson, the condition of private housing in the area, the selection of the area as part of the Neighbourhood Management Pathfinder Programme and policing.

The election saw a trial of optional postal voting in an attempt to increase turnout, but there were allegations that the process was being abused. The Liberal Democrats claimed that about 900 postal votes in four marginal wards were being sent to common addresses, instead of the voters own address. Having the postal vote sent to another address was not illegal, but the Liberal Democrats feared fraud and that people had signed postal ballots without understanding what they were doing. The police made an investigation after one agent for the Liberal Democrats requested it, with the allegations also being looked into by the Electoral Commission.

== Election result ==
The results saw the Labour and Liberal Democrat parties both finish on 19 seats, while the Conservatives won 11. With the number of seats having been reduced by 2, Labour lost 3 seats, the Liberal Democrats lost 1 seat and the Conservatives gained 2 seats. The closest result came in Walverden ward, where it took 8 recounts before the final result was declared, with Labour winning the second seat in the ward by 2 votes over the Liberal Democrats.

Following the election Labour group leader Azhar Ali remained leader of the council, after winning a 19 to 18 vote over Liberal Democrat group leader Alan Davies at the full council meeting.

Pendle local election result 2002
Party	Seats	Gains	Losses	Net gain/loss	Seats %	Votes %	Votes	+/−
Liberal Democrats	19			-1	38.8	38.6	27,067	+6.1%
Labour	19			-3	38.8	32.5	22,761	-3.9%
Conservative	11			+2	22.4	27.7	19,411	-2.5%
Independent	0			0	0	0.8	536	-0.1%
Socialist Alliance	0			0	0	0.5	316	+0.5%

== Ward results ==
Barrowford (3)
Party	Candidate	Votes	%	±%
Liberal Democrats	Allan Vickerman	840		
Conservative	Anthony Beckett	761		
Conservative	Linda Crossley	742		
Liberal Democrats	Michael Simpson	667		
Liberal Democrats	Kay Coates	658		
Conservative	Jonathan Eyre	615		
Labour	Susan Nike	359		
Labour	Anthony Hargreaves	275		
Labour	Robert Oliver	262		
Turnout		5,179	47.7	

Blacko and Higherford
Party	Candidate	Votes	%	±%
Conservative	Shelagh Derwent	569	81.8	
Labour	Helen Ingham	67	9.6	
Liberal Democrats	Christel Abbiss	60	8.6	
Majority		502	72.1	
Turnout		696	52.0	

Boulsworth (3)
Party	Candidate	Votes	%	±%
Liberal Democrats	Josephine Belbin	901		
Liberal Democrats	Alan Davies	831		
Liberal Democrats	David Robertson	828		
Conservative	Michael Calvert	392		
Conservative	James Farnell	305		
Conservative	Harold Ryder	299		
Labour	Deborah Gray	241		
Labour	Robert Parsons	241		
Labour	Martin Wilson	205		
Turnout		4,243	41.2	

Bradley (3)
Party	Candidate	Votes	%	±%
Labour	Mohammed Iqbal	1,052		
Labour	Frederick Hartley	1,047		
Labour	Mohammad Nasim	995		
Liberal Democrats	Mohammed Munir	885		
Liberal Democrats	Sonia Robinson	861		
Liberal Democrats	David Stopforth	800		
Conservative	Eric King	155		
Conservative	Frank Chadwick	153		
Conservative	Edward Myers	132		
Turnout		6,080	52.1	

Brierfield (3)
Party	Candidate	Votes	%	±%
Labour	Frank Clifford	845		
Labour	Pauline Allen	840		
Labour	Abdul Jabbar	838		
Conservative	Peter Jackson	818		
Conservative	Hussnain Ashraf	804		
Conservative	Francis Wren	796		
Liberal Democrats	William Lawrence	227		
Liberal Democrats	Khalid Mehmood	147		
Liberal Democrats	Iain Carlos	145		
Turnout		5,460	56.2	

Clover Hill (3)
Party	Candidate	Votes	%	±%
Labour	Colin Waite	675		
Labour	Neil Akrigg	640		
Liberal Democrats	Kathleen Shore	596		
Labour	Mohammed Ansar	577		
Liberal Democrats	David Foster	545		
Liberal Democrats	Nadeem Malik	444		
Conservative	Audrey Emmott	330		
Conservative	Marian Taylor	300		
Conservative	Ann Jackson	286		
Turnout		4,393	43.4	

Coates (3)
Party	Candidate	Votes	%	±%
Liberal Democrats	Margaret Bell	1,082		
Liberal Democrats	Marjorie Adams	1,020		
Liberal Democrats	Allan Buck	989		
Labour	Paul Hanson	383		
Conservative	David Poole	185		
Conservative	Joyce Myers	179		
Turnout		3,838	39.8	

Craven (3)
Party	Candidate	Votes	%	±%
Liberal Democrats	David Whipp	1,056		
Liberal Democrats	Mary Norcross	973		
Liberal Democrats	Marlene Hill-Crane	879		
Labour	Frank Neal	622		
Conservative	Keith Harrison	254		
Conservative	Barbara Davison	239		
Conservative	Beverley Harrison	235		
Turnout		4,258	43.2	

Earby (3)
Party	Candidate	Votes	%	±%
Conservative	Christopher Tennant	939		
Conservative	Rosemary Carroll	861		
Conservative	Morris Horsfield	861		
Liberal Democrats	Doris Haigh	795		
Liberal Democrats	Timothy Haigh	748		
Liberal Democrats	Claire Day	689		
Labour	William Skinner	278		
Labour	Ruth Wilkinson	236		
Turnout		5,407	45.4	

Foulridge
Party	Candidate	Votes	%	±%
Conservative	Carol Belshaw	352	54.7	
Labour	Jillian Smith	188	29.2	
Liberal Democrats	Michelle Birtwell	104	16.1	
Majority		164	25.5	
Turnout		644	47.5	

Higham and Pendleside
Party	Candidate	Votes	%	±%
Conservative	John Nutter	567	76.7	
Labour	Sheila Wicks	172	23.3	
Majority		395	53.5	
Turnout		739	53.7	

Horsfield (3)
Party	Candidate	Votes	%	±%
Liberal Democrats	Sharon Davies	618		
Liberal Democrats	Dorothy Lord	593		
Liberal Democrats	Ann Kerrigan	566		
Labour	Paul Broughton	423		
Labour	David Johns	406		
Labour	Keith Hutson	356		
Independent	Peter Nowland	301		
Conservative	Janet Riley	207		
Conservative	Alexandra Thompson	192		
Conservative	Donald Myers	162		
Turnout		3,824	36.3	

Marsden (2)
Party	Candidate	Votes	%	±%
Labour	Dorothy Ormrod	473		
Labour	Gary Rowland	455		
Independent	Leonard Atkinson	235		
Conservative	Michael Landriau	232		
Conservative	Victoria Landriau	201		
Liberal Democrats	David French	100		
Liberal Democrats	Doris Stanworth	80		
Turnout		1,776	38.2	

Old Laund Booth
Party	Candidate	Votes	%	±%
Liberal Democrats	John David	639	84.6	
Conservative	Clive Bevan	116	15.4	
Majority		523	69.3	
Turnout		755	62.7	

Reedley (3)
Party	Candidate	Votes	%	±%
Conservative	Pauline McCormick	1,255		
Conservative	Willie Clegg	1,155		
Conservative	Tonia Barton	1,071		
Labour	Robert Allen	681		
Labour	Mohammed Hanif	599		
Labour	Anthony Martin	559		
Liberal Democrats	Victoria Greaves	258		
Liberal Democrats	Frances Myers	215		
Liberal Democrats	Alison Whipp	198		
Turnout		5,991	56.2	

Southfield (3)
Party	Candidate	Votes	%	±%
Labour	Sheena Dunn	787		
Labour	Mohammad Latif	681		
Labour	Azhar Ali	673		
Conservative	Peter Wildman	350		
Conservative	Jack Marshall	344		
Liberal Democrats	Martin Thornton	310		
Liberal Democrats	Rukhsar Ahmed	193		
Liberal Democrats	Mohammed Ashraf	159		
Conservative	Javed Nasim	158		
Turnout		3,655	37.5	

Vivary Bridge (3)
Party	Candidate	Votes	%	±%
Liberal Democrats	David Clegg	617		
Labour	David Whalley	608		
Labour	Frank Allanson	510		
Labour	David Foat	502		
Liberal Democrats	Robert Jackson	479		
Conservative	Smith Benson	290		
Conservative	Ian Porter	281		
Conservative	Geoffrey Riley	249		
Socialist Alliance	Kevin Bean	149		
Turnout		3,685	35.6	

Walverden (2)
Party	Candidate	Votes	%	±%
Labour	George Adam	566		
Labour	Judith Robinson	546		
Liberal Democrats	Qadeer Ahmed	544		
Liberal Democrats	Anthony Greaves	478		
Conservative	Barbara King	186		
Conservative	Ann Tattersall	165		
Turnout		2,485	52.0	

Waterside (3)
Party	Candidate	Votes	%	±%
Liberal Democrats	Edwina Sargeant	626		
Labour	Anne Doult	499		
Liberal Democrats	Ian Robinson	492		
Labour	Ian Tweedie	442		
Liberal Democrats	Adrian Statham	437		
Labour	Ann Moulton	431		
Conservative	Eric Jackson	168		
Socialist Alliance	Richard MacSween	167		
Conservative	Richard Wood	165		
Conservative	Adrian Mitchell	151		
Turnout		3,578	36.7	

Whitefield (2)
Party	Candidate	Votes	%	±%
Liberal Democrats	Mahboob Ahmed	900		
Labour	Asjad Mahmood	846		
Liberal Democrats	Abdul Malik	795		
Labour	Mohammad Arshad	680		
Conservative	Michelle Ainsworth	105		
Conservative	Ijaz Ahmed	79		
Turnout		3,405	70.1	
