= 2007 Pendle Borough Council election =

2007 UK local government election

Map of the results of the 2007 Pendle Borough Council election. Liberal Democrats in yellow, Conservatives in blue and Labour in red. Wards in dark grey were not contested in 2007.

The 2007 Pendle Borough Council election took place on 3 May 2007 to elect members of Pendle Borough Council in Lancashire, England. One third of the council was up for election and the Liberal Democrats stayed in overall control of the council.

After the election, the composition of the council was:

- Liberal Democrat 27
- Conservative 14
- Labour 6
- British National Party 1
- Vacant 1

== Background ==
Before the election the Liberal Democrats had a majority on the council with 26 seats, compared to 13 for the Conservatives, 5 for Labour, 3 independents and 1 British National Party. There was also one vacant seat after a councillor, Mary Norcross, died in March 2007. The Liberal Democrat majority had been reduced since the 2006 election after 3 councillors left the party to become independents.

17 seats were being contested in the election with the Liberal Democrats defending 8 seats, the Conservatives 6 and independents 3. There were a total of 64 candidates in the election, with the Liberal Democrats and Conservatives contesting every seat. Other parties contesting the election included Labour with 16 candidates, 6 from the British National Party, 3 Green Party and 2 United Kingdom Independence Party. There were also some independent candidates, with 3 being the sitting independent, formerly Liberal Democrat, councillors.

== Campaign ==
Issues in the election included council tax, the environment, phone masts, refuse collection and regeneration. There was also controversy over the candidature of independent Ian Robinson in Waterside, after a Liberal Democrat councillor in the same ward signed his nomination papers.

The election saw a drop of about 3% in the number of voters registered to vote by post to 7,562.

== Election result ==
The results saw the Liberal Democrats stay in control of the council after regaining the 3 independent seats, but losing another 2 seats. This meant they held 27 seats and had an overall majority of 7. The Conservatives gained Boulsworth from the Liberal Democrats by 7 votes after 3 recounts to have 14 seats, while Labour went up to 6 seats after taking Bradley by 226 votes. The British National Party remained on 1 seat, after no other party won any seats in the election. Overall turnout in the election was 44.6%.

Pendle local election result 2007
Party	Seats	Gains	Losses	Net gain/loss	Seats %	Votes %	Votes	+/−
Liberal Democrats	9	3	2	+1	52.9	34.8	8,650	-5.8
Conservative	7	1	0	+1	41.2	34.6	8,600	+8.6
Labour	1	1	0	+1	5.9	17.7	4,399	-5.3
BNP	0	0	0	0	0.0	7.0	1,737	-3.4
Independent	0	0	3	-3	0.0	4.3	1,065	+4.3
Green	0	0	0	0	0.0	1.2	303	+1.2
UKIP	0	0	0	0	0.0	0.5	133	+0.5

== Ward results ==
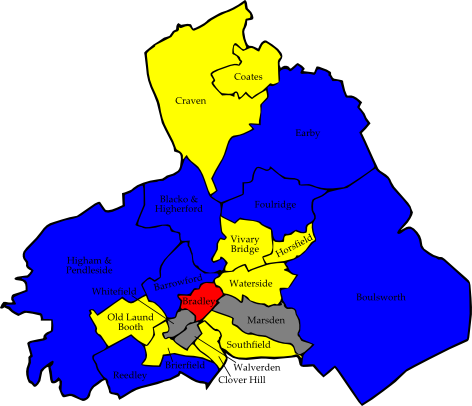
Map of the results of the 2007 Pendle Borough Council election with ward names.

Barrowford
Party	Candidate	Votes	%	±%
Conservative	Linda Crossley	1,087	66.9	+21.7
Labour	Susan Nike	411	25.3	+14.0
Liberal Democrats	Derek Mann	126	7.8	−35.7
Majority		676	41.6	+39.9
Turnout		1,624	41.6	−0.1
Conservative hold		Swing		

Blacko and Higherford
Party	Candidate	Votes	%	±%
Conservative	Shelagh Derwent	566	79.8	−4.6
Labour	John Pope	80	11.3	+1.8
Liberal Democrats	Darren Reynolds	63	8.9	+2.8
Majority		486	68.5	−6.4
Turnout		709	49.5	+0.4
Conservative hold		Swing		

Boulsworth
Party	Candidate	Votes	%	±%
Conservative	Violet Vaughan	647	36.9	+5.9
Liberal Democrats	David Robertson	640	36.5	−0.5
BNP	Jane Mulligan	271	15.5	−9.7
Labour	Jillian Allanson	121	6.9	+0.2
Green	Leah Jamieson	74	4.2	+4.2
Majority		7	0.4	
Turnout		1,753	43.4	−3.0
Conservative gain from Liberal Democrats		Swing		

Bradley
Party	Candidate	Votes	%	±%
Labour	Nadeem Younis	1,026	44.0	−2.0
Liberal Democrats	Mohammed Munir	800	34.3	−8.2
Conservative	Victoria Landriau	344	14.7	+3.1
Green	Christine Stables	164	7.0	+7.0
Majority		226	9.7	+6.2
Turnout		2,334	51.1	+3.1
Labour gain from Liberal Democrats		Swing		

Brierfield
Party	Candidate	Votes	%	±%
Liberal Democrats	Nawaz Ahmed	943	49.7	+9.6
Conservative	Ann Jackson	537	28.3	−1.6
Labour	Robert Allen	416	21.9	−8.2
Majority		406	21.4	+11.4
Turnout		1,896	50.6	+8.3
Liberal Democrats hold		Swing		

Clover Hill
Party	Candidate	Votes	%	±%
Liberal Democrats	Gary Bird	570	32.8	−11.4
Labour	Eileen Ansar	415	23.9	+2.1
BNP	Trevor Dawson	336	19.3	−5.3
Conservative	Timothy Eyre	208	12.0	+2.6
Independent	Kate Shore	163	9.4	+9.4
UKIP	John Banks	45	2.6	+2.6
Majority		155	8.9	−10.6
Turnout		1,737	45.5	+2.2
Liberal Democrats gain from Independent		Swing		

Coates
Party	Candidate	Votes	%	±%
Liberal Democrats	Allan Buck	745	49.7	−14.9
Independent	Jennifer Purcell	410	27.4	+27.4
Conservative	Beverley Harrison	205	13.7	−8.0
Labour	Ian Tweedie	139	9.3	−4.4
Majority		335	22.3	−20.6
Turnout		1,499	37.5	−1.6
Liberal Democrats hold		Swing		

Craven
Party	Candidate	Votes	%	±%
Liberal Democrats	Martin Bell	736	46.9	−3.4
Independent	Marlene Hill-Crane	428	27.3	+27.3
Conservative	Sandra Sargeant	405	25.8	+9.4
Majority		308	19.6	−5.7
Turnout		1,569	38.0	−6.1
Liberal Democrats gain from Independent		Swing		

Earby
Party	Candidate	Votes	%	±%
Conservative	Morris Horsfield	1,264	69.1	+9.9
Liberal Democrats	Jackie Taylforth	324	17.7	−8.5
Labour	James Metcalfe	240	13.1	−1.5
Majority		940	51.4	+18.4
Turnout		1,828	40.9	−1.3
Conservative hold		Swing		

Foulridge
Party	Candidate	Votes	%	±%
Conservative	Carol Belshaw	342	56.1	−5.9
Liberal Democrats	Geoffrey Cole	132	21.6	+7.7
UKIP	Graham Cannon	88	14.4	+14.4
Labour	Frank Allanson	48	7.9	−16.2
Majority		210	34.4	−3.6
Turnout		610	44.7	+9.1
Conservative hold		Swing		

Higham and Pendleside
Party	Candidate	Votes	%	±%
Conservative	James Starkie	520	62.4	+10.9
Liberal Democrats	William Boylan	264	31.7	−7.5
Labour	Robert Oliver	49	5.9	−3.4
Majority		256	30.7	+18.5
Turnout		833	60.9	+10.0
Conservative hold		Swing		

Horsfield
Party	Candidate	Votes	%	±%
Liberal Democrats	Ann Kerrigan	651	43.7	+0.5
Conservative	Smith Benson	314	21.1	+9.0
BNP	Geoffrey Whitehead	295	19.8	−9.0
Labour	David Foat	231	15.5	−0.4
Majority		337	22.6	+8.2
Turnout		1,491	37.6	−2.3
Liberal Democrats hold		Swing		

Old Laund Booth
Party	Candidate	Votes	%	±%
Liberal Democrats	John David	462	66.0	−14.1
Conservative	Anthony Belshaw	212	30.3	+10.4
Labour	Anthony Hargreaves	26	3.7	+3.7
Majority		250	35.7	−24.5
Turnout		700	58.1	+1.6
Liberal Democrats hold		Swing		

Reedley
Party	Candidate	Votes	%	±%
Conservative	Tonia Barton	1,222	63.6	
Labour	Saad Khaliq	380	19.8	
Liberal Democrats	Abdul Malik	320	16.6	
Majority		842	43.8	
Turnout		1,922	47.1	+1.0
Conservative hold		Swing		

Southfield
Party	Candidate	Votes	%	±%
Liberal Democrats	Sonia Robinson	634	40.6	+0.6
Labour	Sheila Wicks	364	23.3	−19.6
Conservative	Paul McKenna	282	18.1	+1.0
BNP	Judith Preston	280	17.9	+17.9
Majority		270	17.3	
Turnout		1,560	38.7	+16.7
Liberal Democrats hold		Swing		

Vivary Bridge
Party	Candidate	Votes	%	±%
Liberal Democrats	Howard Thomas	641	45.9	
Conservative	Geoffrey Riley	274	19.6	
BNP	Veronica Cullen	272	19.5	
Labour	Tony Martin	211	15.1	
Majority		367	26.3	
Turnout		1,398	34.8	−3.5
Liberal Democrats hold		Swing		

Waterside
Party	Candidate	Votes	%	±%
Liberal Democrats	Graham Roach	599	42.1	−16.4
BNP	Adam Grant	283	19.9	+19.9
Labour	Gerry McCabe	242	17.0	−9.4
Conservative	Peter Hill	171	12.0	−3.0
Green	Anastasia Hartley-Fish	65	4.6	+4.6
Independent	Ian Robinson	64	4.5	+4.5
Majority		316	22.2	−9.9
Turnout		1,424	38.2	+7.1
Liberal Democrats gain from Independent		Swing		

== By-elections between 2007 and 2008 ==
A by-election took place on 28 June 2007 after the death of Liberal Democrat councillor Mary Norcross. Twenty-six-year-old Shelley Franklin held the seat for the Liberal Democrats with a majority of 372 votes over the Conservatives.

Craven By-Election 28 June 2007
Party	Candidate	Votes	%	±%
Liberal Democrats	Shelley Franklin	632	43.7	−3.2
Conservative	Sandra Sargeant	260	18.0	−7.8
Independent	Jennifer Purcell	241	16.7	−10.6
BNP	Geoffrey Whitehead	237	16.4	+16.4
Labour	Ian Tweedie	76	5.3	+5.3
Majority		372	25.7	+6.1
Turnout		1,446	34.7	−3.3
Liberal Democrats hold		Swing		
