= 2023 Pendle Borough Council election =

2023 UK local government election

← 2022	4 May 2023	2024 →

12 of 33 seats on Pendle Borough Council 17 seats needed for a majority

	First party	Second party
Leader	Nadeem Ahmed	Asjad Mahmood
Party	Conservative	Labour
Seats before	17 (Note: Including one vacant seat in Vivary Bridge ward previously held by Conservative councillor Paul McGladdery prior to his resignation in March 2023.)	10
Seats won	5	4
Seats after	14	11
Seat change	▼3	▲1
Popular vote	10,032	9,902
Percentage	40.2%	39.7%
Swing	▼6.2%	▲4.9%
	Third party	Fourth party
Leader	David Whipp
Party	Liberal Democrats	Independent
Seats before	5	1
Seats won	3	0
Seats after	7	1
Seat change	▲2	Steady
Popular vote	3,957
Percentage	15.9%
Swing	▲0.3%
Leader before election
Nadeem Ahmed
Conservative
Leader after election
Asjad Mahmood
Labour
No overall control

The 2023 Pendle Borough Council election took place on 4 May 2023 to elect a third of the council for the Borough of Pendle in Lancashire, England. This was on the same day as other local elections in England. Twelve seats across eleven wards were up for election, being the usual approximate third of the council plus a by-election in Vivary Bridge ward.

The council was under Conservative majority control prior to the election. After the election the council was under no overall control; the Conservatives were still the largest party but no longer had a majority. After the election a coalition of Labour and the Liberal Democrats formed to take control of the council. At the subsequent annual council meeting on 18 May 2023 the Labour group leader Asjad Mahmood was appointed leader of the council.

== Results ==
Party	Leader	Councillors			Votes	
Party	Leader		Of Total			Of Total
Conservative Party	Nadeem Ahmed	5	41.7%	14 / 33	10,032	40.2%
Labour Party	Asjad Mahmood	4	33.3%	11 / 33	9,902	39.7%
Liberal Democrats	David Whipp	3	25.0%	7 / 33	3,957	15.9%
Green Party of England and Wales		0	0.0%	0 / 33	1,002	4.0%
UK Independence Party		0	0.0%	0 / 33	43	0.2%
Independent (elected Labour)				1 / 33		

== Ward results ==
Incumbent councillors denoted by an asterisk (*). These seats were last up for election when new ward boundaries were introduced in 2021 - percentage changes are calculated based on the mean party result in 2021.

=== Barnoldswick ===
Barnoldswick
Party	Candidate	Votes	%	±%
Liberal Democrats	Mick Strickland	983	51.2	+13.8
Conservative	Jenny Purcell*	560	29.2	−15.4
Labour	Euan Robert Clouston	248	12.9	−2.4
Green	Sylvia Joyce Godfrey	85	4.4	N/A
UKIP	Steven Preston	43	2.2	N/A
Majority		423	22.0	+16.0
Turnout		1,919	29.2	−4.2
Liberal Democrats gain from Conservative		Swing		

=== Barrowford and Pendleside ===
Barrowford and Pendleside
Party	Candidate	Votes	%	±%
Conservative	David Harry Gallear*	1,231	55.9	−3.6
Labour	Susan Frances Nike	813	36.9	+12.8
Green	David Richard John Penney	79	3.6	N/A
Liberal Democrats	Philip Alfred Berry	78	3.5	−3.5
Majority		418	19.0	−18.6
Turnout		2,201	37.3	−5.1
Conservative hold		Swing		

=== Boulsworth and Foulridge ===
Boulsworth and Foulridge
Party	Candidate	Votes	%	±%
Conservative	David Charles Cockburn-Price*	1,123	56.4	−1.2
Labour	Wayne Blackburn	464	23.3	+7.9
Liberal Democrats	Andrew John Latham MacDonald	274	13.8	−11.8
Green	Lyndsey Jane Taylor	130	6.5	N/A
Majority		659	33.1	−3.0
Turnout		1,991	31.7	−5.8
Conservative hold		Swing		

=== Bradley ===
Bradley
Party	Candidate	Votes	%	±%
Conservative	Mohammad Aslam*	1,872	56.0	+7.0
Labour	Mohammad Sakib	1,471	44.0	+1.3
Majority		401	12.0	N/A
Turnout		3,343	53.7	+1.1
Conservative hold		Swing		

=== Brierfield East and Clover Hill ===
Brierfield East and Clover Hill
Party	Candidate	Votes	%	±%
Labour	Zafar Ali*	1,723	72.5	+24.4
Conservative	Ali Ahmed	652	27.5	−11.3
Majority		1,071	45.0	+29.0
Turnout		2,375	38.0	−7.7
Labour hold		Swing		

=== Brierfield West and Reedley ===
Brierfield West and Reedley
Party	Candidate	Votes	%	±%
Labour	Yasser Iqbal*	1,555	76.3	+16.2
Conservative	Pauline Anne McCormick	366	18.0	−10.9
Green	Paul James Graham	116	5.7	N/A
Majority		1,189	58.3	+20.5
Turnout		2,037	45.1	−7.8
Labour hold		Swing		

=== Earby and Coates ===
Earby and Coates
Party	Candidate	Votes	%	±%
Liberal Democrats	Susan Lynne Land	1,037	48.6	+15.9
Conservative	Mike Goulthorp*	873	40.9	−4.8
Green	Jane Veronica Bailes Wood	225	10.5	N/A
Majority		164	7.7	N/A
Turnout		2,135	38.2	+1.2
Liberal Democrats gain from Conservative		Swing		

=== Marsden and Southfield ===
Marsden and Southfield
Party	Candidate	Votes	%	±%
Labour	Yvonne Marion Tennant	1,011	52.8	+20.5
Conservative	Neil McGowan*	810	42.3	−6.4
Green	Heather Mary Sheldrick	92	4.8	N/A
Majority		201	10.5	N/A
Turnout		1,913	32.3	−7.5
Labour gain from Conservative		Swing		

=== Vivary Bridge ===
Vivary Bridge (2 seats)
Party	Candidate	Votes	%	±%
Conservative	Tom Ormerod	524	41.2	−7.4
Conservative	Kieran Garth McGladdery*	521	40.9	−6.8
Liberal Democrats	Andy Bell	384	30.2	−2.4
Liberal Democrats	Bryan Wildman	336	26.4	+0.1
Labour Co-op	David Kenneth Foat	325	25.5	+7.5
Labour Co-op	Ann Marie Wrigley	290	22.8	+5.2
Green	Benjamin Daniel Harrop	93	7.3	N/A
Turnout		1,273	24.0	−4.2
Conservative hold		Swing		
Conservative hold		Swing		

=== Waterside and Horsfield ===
Waterside and Horsfield
Party	Candidate	Votes	%	±%
Liberal Democrats	Dorothy Elizabeth Lord*	865	55.8	+11.5
Conservative	Aneesa Neelam McGladdery	504	32.5	−5.7
Green	Karan Leslie	182	11.7	N/A
Majority		361	23.3	N/A
Turnout		1,551	27.7	−3.6
Liberal Democrats hold		Swing		

=== Whitefield and Walverden ===
Whitefield and Walverden
Party	Candidate	Votes	%	±%
Labour	Faraz Ahmad*	2,002	66.8	+7.2
Conservative	Chaudhary Usman Zaman	996	33.2	+2.3
Majority		1,006	33.6	+2.3
Turnout		2,998	45.7	−2.2
Labour hold		Swing		
