= 1999 Pendle Borough Council election =

1999 UK local government election

The 1999 Pendle Borough Council election took place on 6 May 1999 to elect members of Pendle Borough Council in Lancashire, England. One third of the council was up for election and the Liberal Democrats lost overall control of the council to no overall control.

After the election, the composition of the council was:

- Liberal Democrat - 23
- Labour - 20
- Conservative - 7
- Independent - 1

== Campaign ==
Before the election the Liberal Democrats ran the council with 30 councillors, compared to 17 Labour, 3 Conservatives and 1 independent. 17 seats were being contested in the election, with the Liberal Democrats defending 12 and Labour 5. 4 sitting councillors stood down at the election, 2 each from the Liberal Democrat and Labour parties.

The only candidate not from the three main parties was Peter Hartley, who stood as an independent green in Vivary Bridge ward, but during the campaign it was reported that he was actually living in Sheffield and standing as a candidate there as well.

== Election results ==
The results saw the Liberal Democrats lose their majority on the council after 4 years in control. The Liberal Democrats lost 4 seats to the Conservatives and a further 3 to the Labour Party, meaning that the Liberal Democrats fell to 23 seats, Labour rose to 20, the Conservatives to 7 and there remained 1 independent. The Liberal Democrats said the other two parties had worked together to target Liberal Democrat held seats, but this was denied by the Conservative and Labour parties.

The Labour gains came in the wards of Craven, Vivary Bridge and Whitefield, while the Conservatives took the seats of Barrowford, Earby, Foulridge and Reedley. All 4 Conservatives gains were by women, meaning the Conservative group leader Roy Clarkson then had 6 female Conservative councillors in his council group. Meanwhile, the Liberal Democrats only narrowly held a further 2 seats after recounts, Edwina Sargeant holding Waterside by 9 votes and Ian Gilhespy retaining Horsfield by a single vote.

Following the election the parties were unable to agree on who should run the council. As a result, the council meeting after the election had no nominations for leader of the council. The Liberal Democrats voted down an attempt by Labour to take minority control and instead the councillors voted to rotate the chairmanship of the main committees over the next 12 months between the three parties.

Pendle local election result 1999
Party	Seats	Gains	Losses	Net gain/loss	Seats %	Votes %	Votes	+/−
Labour	8	3	0	+3	47.1	40.7	9,060	+2.1
Liberal Democrats	5	0	7	-7	29.4	38.2	8,520	-3.4
Conservative	4	4	0	+4	23.5	21.0	4,672	+1.2
An Independent Green Candidate	0	0	0	0	0.0	0.1	29	+0.1

== Ward results ==
Barrowford
Party	Candidate	Votes	%	±%
Conservative	Linda Crossley	595	38.6	+9.6
Liberal Democrats	Paul Carrins	509	33.1	−12.1
Labour	Anthony Hargreaves	436	28.3	+2.6
Majority		86	5.6	
Turnout		1,540	32.4	−1.1
Conservative gain from Liberal Democrats		Swing		

Boulsworth
Party	Candidate	Votes	%	±%
Liberal Democrats	David Robertson	649	54.6	−5.6
Conservative	Richard Wood	286	24.1	+7.1
Labour	David Foat	254	21.4	−1.5
Majority		363	30.5	−6.8
Turnout		1,189	28.1	+0.4
Liberal Democrats hold		Swing		

Bradley
Party	Candidate	Votes	%	±%
Labour	Frederick Hartley	940	51.1	+1.7
Liberal Democrats	Mohammed Munir	815	44.3	+4.8
Conservative	Janet Riley	85	4.6	−6.5
Majority		125	6.8	−3.1
Turnout		1,840	51.1	+9.8
Labour hold		Swing		

Brierfield
Party	Candidate	Votes	%	±%
Liberal Democrats	Sajjad Karim	578	38.2	+28.0
Labour	Anthony Martin	562	37.1	−17.6
Conservative	Zita Lord	373	24.7	−10.3
Majority		16	1.1	
Turnout		1,513	46.7	+11.6
Liberal Democrats hold		Swing		

Clover Hill
Party	Candidate	Votes	%	±%
Labour	Colin Waite	681	69.0	+10.9
Conservative	Frank Chadwick	223	22.6	+3.8
Liberal Democrats	David French	83	8.4	−14.7
Majority		458	46.4	+11.4
Turnout		987	28.6	−1.5
Labour hold		Swing		

Coates
Party	Candidate	Votes	%	±%
Liberal Democrats	Margaret Bell	674	53.8	−3.4
Labour	John Edwards	434	34.7	+5.8
Conservative	Morris Horsfield	144	11.5	−2.4
Majority		240	18.2	−10.0
Turnout		1,252	32.5	+1.2
Liberal Democrats hold		Swing		

Craven
Party	Candidate	Votes	%	±%
Labour	Frank Neal	549	45.8	+17.0
Liberal Democrats	Alison Whipp	469	39.1	−15.5
Conservative	Mark Langtree	180	15.0	−1.5
Majority		80	6.7	
Turnout		1,198	29.9	+1.2
Labour gain from Liberal Democrats		Swing		

Earby
Party	Candidate	Votes	%	±%
Conservative	Rosemary Carroll	778	42.7	+3.2
Liberal Democrats	Timothy Haigh	756	41.5	−2.2
Labour	Jean Skinner	289	15.9	−0.9
Majority		22	1.2	
Turnout		1,823	42.3	+4.5
Conservative gain from Liberal Democrats		Swing		

Foulridge
Party	Candidate	Votes	%	±%
Conservative	Carol Belshaw	247	51.8	
Liberal Democrats	Peter Moss	166	34.8	
Labour	Martin Wilson	64	13.4	
Majority		81	17.0	
Turnout		477	42.0	
Conservative gain from Liberal Democrats		Swing		

Horsfield
Party	Candidate	Votes	%	±%
Liberal Democrats	Ian Gilhespy	449	43.0	−10.3
Labour	David Johns	448	42.9	−3.8
Conservative	Smith Benson	147	14.1	+14.1
Majority		1	0.1	−6.5
Turnout		1,044	30.9	−2.1
Liberal Democrats hold		Swing		

Marsden
Party	Candidate	Votes	%	±%
Labour	Azhar Ali	614	61.9	−10.1
Conservative	Michael Landriau	279	28.1	+0.1
Liberal Democrats	William Masih	99	10.0	+10.0
Majority		335	33.8	−10.1
Turnout		992	27.8	+6.4
Labour hold		Swing		

Reedley
Party	Candidate	Votes	%	±%
Conservative	Tonia Barton	655	50.5	−6.6
Liberal Democrats	Allan Buck	459	35.4	+15.8
Labour	Mohammed Razaq	183	14.1	−9.2
Majority		196	15.1	−18.7
Turnout		1,297	35.8	+2.1
Conservative gain from Liberal Democrats		Swing		

Southfield
Party	Candidate	Votes	%	±%
Labour	Sheena Dunn	587	56.4	−18.0
Liberal Democrats	Michael Le-Page	236	22.7	+22.7
Conservative	Peter Wildman	218	20.9	−4.7
Majority		351	33.7	−15.2
Turnout		1,041	32.2	+3.7
Labour hold		Swing		

Vivary Bridge
Party	Candidate	Votes	%	±%
Labour	Julie Hunting	721	50.1	+5.1
Liberal Democrats	John Beck	555	38.6	−8.7
Conservative	Geoffrey Riley	133	9.2	+1.6
An Independent Green Candidate	Peter Hartley	29	2.0	+2.0
Majority		166	11.5	
Turnout		1,438	34.3	+4.8
Labour gain from Liberal Democrats		Swing		

Walverden
Party	Candidate	Votes	%	±%
Labour	Judith Robinson	707	51.3	+18.2
Liberal Democrats	Lawrence Collett	534	38.7	−13.4
Conservative	Ann Tattersall	138	10.0	−4.9
Majority		173	12.5	
Turnout		1,379	46.7	+1.9
Labour hold		Swing		

Waterside
Party	Candidate	Votes	%	±%
Liberal Democrats	Edwina Sargeant	579	47.0	+3.4
Labour	Ian Tweedie	570	46.3	−3.1
Conservative	Adrian Mitchell	82	6.7	−0.3
Majority		9	0.7	
Turnout		1,231	38.4	+3.2
Liberal Democrats hold		Swing		

Whitefield
Party	Candidate	Votes	%	±%
Labour	Mohammed Ansar	1,021	50.0	+6.7
Liberal Democrats	Ghulam Rasool	910	44.6	−7.1
Conservative	Frank Hook	109	5.3	+0.3
Majority		111	5.4	
Turnout		2,040	66.0	+6.0
Labour gain from Liberal Democrats		Swing		
