= 2016 Pendle Borough Council election =

2016 UK local government election

Results of the 2016 Pendle Borough Council election

The 2016 Pendle Borough Council election took place on 5 May 2016 to elect members of Pendle Borough Council in England. This was on the same day as other local elections.

== By-elections between 2016 and 2018 ==
Reedley by-election 24 November 2016
Party	Candidate	Votes	%	±%
Conservative	Pauline McCormick	1,267	51.1	+5.7
Labour	Mohammad Hanif	1,156	46.6	+6.7
Liberal Democrats	James Wood	57	2.3	−3.7
Majority		111	4.5	
Turnout		2,480		
Conservative gain from Labour		Swing		
