= 1998 Pendle Borough Council election =

1998 UK local government election

The 1998 Pendle Borough Council election took place on 7 May 1998 to elect members of Pendle Borough Council in Lancashire, England. One third of the council was up for election and the Liberal Democrats stayed in overall control of the council.

After the election, the composition of the council was:

- Liberal Democrat 29
- Labour 18
- Conservative 3
- Independent 1

== Campaign ==
17 seats were contested in the election, with the Liberal Democrats defending 10 seats, Labour 6 and the Conservatives 1 seat. The election saw controversy over proxy votes, as the Labour and Liberal Democrat parties accused each other of abusing the system.

During the campaign the Liberal Democrat national leader Paddy Ashdown came to Pendle to support his party.

== Election result ==
The results saw no change in the political balance of the council, with the Liberal Democrats remaining in control of the council. The Labour Party gained 2 seats from the Liberal Democrats in Bradley and Waterside wards, but the Liberal Democrats took the seats of Walverden and Whitefield back. Meanwhile, the Conservative group leader, Roy Clarkson, held the only seat the Conservatives had been defending in Reedley. Overall turnout in the election was 34.4%.

Pendle local election result 1998
Party	Seats	Gains	Losses	Net gain/loss	Seats %	Votes %	Votes	+/−
Liberal Democrats	10	2	2	0	58.8	41.6	8,662	
Labour	6	2	2	0	35.3	38.6	8,033	
Conservative	1	0	0	0	5.9	19.8	4,132	

== Ward results ==
Barrowford
Party	Candidate	Votes	%	±%
Liberal Democrats	Allan Vickerman	717	45.2	
Conservative	Linda Crossley	460	29.0	
Labour	Anthony Hargreaves	408	25.7	
Majority		257	16.2	
Turnout		1,585	33.5	
Liberal Democrats hold		Swing		

Boulsworth
Party	Candidate	Votes	%	±%
Liberal Democrats	Alan Davies	702	60.2	
Labour	Martin Wilson	267	22.9	
Conservative	James Ilott	198	17.0	
Majority		435	37.3	
Turnout		1,167	27.7	
Liberal Democrats hold		Swing		

Bradley
Party	Candidate	Votes	%	±%
Labour	Mohammed Iqbal	750	49.4	
Liberal Democrats	Mohammed Munir	600	39.5	
Conservative	Janet Riley	169	11.1	
Majority		150	9.9	
Turnout		1,519	41.3	
Labour gain from Liberal Democrats		Swing		

Brierfield
Party	Candidate	Votes	%	±%
Labour	Frank Clifford	631	54.7	
Conservative	Zita Lord	404	35.0	
Liberal Democrats	Doris Stanworth	118	10.2	
Majority		227	19.7	
Turnout		1,153	35.1	
Labour hold		Swing		

Clover Hill
Party	Candidate	Votes	%	±%
Labour	Kathleen Shore	601	58.1	
Liberal Democrats	David French	239	23.1	
Conservative	Frank Chadwick	194	18.8	
Majority		362	35.0	
Turnout		1,034	30.1	
Labour hold		Swing		

Coates
Party	Candidate	Votes	%	±%
Liberal Democrats	Marjorie Adams	691	57.2	
Labour	William Skinner	350	28.9	
Conservative	Craig Toon	168	13.9	
Majority		341	28.2	
Turnout		1,209	31.3	
Liberal Democrats hold		Swing		

Craven
Party	Candidate	Votes	%	±%
Liberal Democrats	Mary Norcross	631	54.6	
Labour	John Edwards	333	28.8	
Conservative	Mark Langtree	191	16.5	
Majority		298	25.8	
Turnout		1,155	28.7	
Liberal Democrats hold		Swing		

Earby
Party	Candidate	Votes	%	±%
Liberal Democrats	Doris Allen	709	43.7	
Conservative	Rosemary Carroll	641	39.5	
Labour	Kathleen Strachan	273	16.8	
Majority		68	4.2	
Turnout		1,623	37.8	
Liberal Democrats hold		Swing		

Fence
Party	Candidate	Votes	%	±%
Liberal Democrats	John David	731	84.4	
Conservative	Adrian Mitchell	89	10.3	
Labour	Ian Lockwood	46	5.3	
Majority		642	74.1	
Turnout		866	46.0	
Liberal Democrats hold		Swing		

Horsfield
Party	Candidate	Votes	%	±%
Liberal Democrats	Gillian Gilhespy	601	53.3	
Labour	Colin Nightingale	527	46.7	
Majority		74	6.6	
Turnout		1,128	33.0	
Liberal Democrats hold		Swing		

Marsden
Party	Candidate	Votes	%	±%
Labour	Gary Rowland	552	72.0	
Conservative	Tonia Barton	215	28.0	
Majority		337	43.9	
Turnout		767	21.4	
Labour hold		Swing		

Reedley
Party	Candidate	Votes	%	±%
Conservative	Roy Clarkson	711	57.1	
Labour	Anthony Martin	290	23.3	
Liberal Democrats	Sean Hunt	244	19.6	
Majority		421	33.8	
Turnout		1,245	33.7	
Conservative hold		Swing		

Southfield
Party	Candidate	Votes	%	±%
Labour	Pauline Allen	690	74.4	
Conservative	Peter Wildman	237	25.6	
Majority		453	48.9	
Turnout		927	28.5	
Labour hold		Swing		

Vivary Bridge
Party	Candidate	Votes	%	±%
Liberal Democrats	David Clegg	576	47.3	
Labour	Pamela Barnett	548	45.0	
Conservative	Geoffrey Riley	93	7.6	
Majority		28	2.3	
Turnout		1,217	29.5	
Liberal Democrats hold		Swing		

Walverden
Party	Candidate	Votes	%	±%
Liberal Democrats	Safdar Hussain	680	52.1	
Labour	Rahmat Raja	432	33.1	
Conservative	Michael Landriau	194	14.9	
Majority		248	19.0	
Turnout		1,306	44.8	
Liberal Democrats gain from Labour		Swing		

Waterside
Party	Candidate	Votes	%	±%
Labour	Ann Doult	547	49.4	
Liberal Democrats	John Beck	483	43.6	
Conservative	Kathleen Hodgson	78	7.0	
Majority		64	5.8	
Turnout		1,108	35.2	
Labour gain from Liberal Democrats		Swing		

Whitefield
Party	Candidate	Votes	%	±%
Liberal Democrats	Shabbir Ahmed	940	51.7	
Labour	Mohammed Ansar	788	43.3	
Conservative	Paul McKenna	90	5.0	
Majority		152	8.4	
Turnout		1,818	60.0	
Liberal Democrats gain from Labour		Swing		

== By-elections between 1998 and 1999 ==
Horsfield By-Election 10 December 1998
Party	Candidate	Votes	%	±%
Liberal Democrats	Gillian Williamson	452	45.4	+8.1
Labour		433	43.4	−11.4
Conservative		112	11.2	+3.3
Majority		19	2.0	
Turnout		997	29.0	
Liberal Democrats gain from Labour		Swing		
