= 2003 Pendle Borough Council election =

Local election in England

Map of the results of the 2003 Pendle Borough Council election. Liberal Democrats in yellow and Conservatives in blue. Wards in dark grey were not contested in 2003.

The 2003 Pendle Borough Council election took place on 1 May 2003 to elect members of Pendle Borough Council in Lancashire, England. One third of the council was up for election and the council stayed under no overall control.

After the election, the composition of the council was

- Liberal Democrat 23
- Labour 15
- Conservative 11

== Campaign ==
Before the election the council had 19 Labour, 19 Liberal Democrat and 11 Conservative councillors, with Labour holding power as a minority administration. 18 seats were being elected, with 2 seats contested in Boulsworth after the death of councillor Jo Belbin. In total 63 candidates stood, with only one sitting councillor, Abdul Jabbar in Brierfield, not standing for re-election. As well as candidates from the Conservative, Labour and Liberal Democrat parties, there were also 3 candidates from the Socialist Alliance, 4 independents and 4 from the British National Party. This was the first time the British National Party had put up candidates in Pendle.

Issues in the election included the proposed redevelopment of Nelson town centre, plans for an A56 bypass and the proposed demolition of houses in Nelson West. Other issues as usual were council tax levels, litter, street safety and crime, while the national issue of the Iraq War was expected to influence voters.

== Election result ==
The results saw the Liberal Democrats become the largest party on the council, but without a majority, after making four gains from Labour. This took the Liberal Democrats to 23 seats, compared to 15 for Labour and 11 Conservatives, after the Liberal Democrats nearly won as many votes as the Conservative and Labour parties combined. The Labour leader of the council, Azhar Ali, was among the councillors to lose their seats in the election, which saw the party fail to win any seats. Ali blamed the defeats both on a backlash against the Iraq War and on an alleged "dirty tricks campaign". Meanwhile, the British National Party failed to win any seats, but did poll a significant number of votes.

Following the election many of the Liberal Democrat councillors boycotted the swearing in of a new mayor in protest against the way he was elected instead of the previous years deputy mayor. Liberal Democrat Alan Davies became the new leader of the council, but his party initially refused to take places on the executive committee. This was because the council had voted for a 4–3–3 party split on the committee rather than the 5–3–2 split the Liberal Democrats had proposed. Meanwhile, the Labour group chose Frank Clifford to become the new leader of their group.

Pendle local election result 2003
Party	Seats	Gains	Losses	Net gain/loss	Seats %	Votes %	Votes	+/−
Liberal Democrats	12	4	0	+4	66.7	44.5	10,798	+5.9%
Conservative	6	0	0	0	33.3	24.0	5,821	-3.3%
Labour	0	0	4	-4	0	21.4	5,202	-11.1%
BNP	0	0	0	0	0	7.3	1,769	+7.3%
Independent	0	0	0	0	0	2.2	530	+1.4%
Socialist Alliance	0	0	0	0	0	0.6	148	+0.1%

== Ward results ==
Barrowford
Party	Candidate	Votes	%	±%
Conservative	Linda Crossley	565	31.0	
Liberal Democrats	Michael Simpson	535	29.4	
BNP	Michael Brennan	482	26.5	
Labour	Anthony Hargreaves	240	13.2	
Majority		30	1.6	
Turnout		1,822	46.5	−1.2
Conservative hold		Swing		

Blacko and Higherford
Party	Candidate	Votes	%	±%
Conservative	Shelagh Derwent	552	84.4	+2.6
Labour	Helen Ingham	62	9.5	−0.1
Liberal Democrats	Carman Stanworth	40	6.1	−2.5
Majority		490	74.9	+2.8
Turnout		654	49.1	−2.9
Conservative hold		Swing		

Boulsworth (2)
Party	Candidate	Votes	%	±%
Liberal Democrats	David Robertson	784		
Liberal Democrats	Laurence Turner	625		
Conservative	Michael Calvert	493		
Conservative	Geoffrey Riley	370		
Labour	Christine Dawson	188		
Labour	David Foat	160		
Turnout		2,620	36.6	−4.6
Liberal Democrats hold		Swing		
Liberal Democrats hold		Swing		

Bradley
Party	Candidate	Votes	%	±%
Liberal Democrats	Mohammed Munir	1,208	62.4	
Labour	Mohammad Sakib	727	37.6	
Majority		481	24.9	
Turnout		1,935	46.9	−5.2
Liberal Democrats gain from Labour		Swing		

Brierfield
Party	Candidate	Votes	%	±%
Liberal Democrats	Nawaz Ahmed	819	50.8	
Labour	Keith Hutson	409	25.4	
Conservative	Peter Jackson	330	20.5	
Socialist Alliance	Siobhan Daniel	54	3.3	
Majority		410	25.4	
Turnout		1,612	44.9	−11.3
Liberal Democrats gain from Labour		Swing		

Clover Hill
Party	Candidate	Votes	%	±%
Liberal Democrats	Kathleen Shore	768	43.8	
BNP	Trevor Dawson	452	25.8	
Labour	Mohammed Ansar	445	25.4	
Conservative	Michael Landriau	87	5.0	
Majority		316	18.0	
Turnout		1,752	47.7	+4.3
Liberal Democrats hold		Swing		

Coates
Party	Candidate	Votes	%	±%
Liberal Democrats	Allan Buck	989	55.4	
BNP	Geoffrey Whitehead	394	22.1	
Labour	William Skinner	176	9.9	
Independent	Jennifer Purcell	114	6.4	
Conservative	Valerie Langtree	112	6.3	
Majority		595	33.3	
Turnout		1,785	44.8	+5.0
Liberal Democrats hold		Swing		

Craven
Party	Candidate	Votes	%	±%
Liberal Democrats	Marlene Hill-Crane	880	53.7	
Labour	Frank Neal	548	33.4	
Conservative	Barbara Watson-Davison	212	12.9	
Majority		332	20.2	
Turnout		1,640	40.8	−2.4
Liberal Democrats hold		Swing		

Earby
Party	Candidate	Votes	%	±%
Conservative	Morris Horsfield	822	49.0	
Liberal Democrats	Timothy Haigh	659	39.2	
Labour	Ruth Wilkinson	198	11.8	
Majority		163	9.7	
Turnout		1,679	38.6	−6.8
Conservative hold		Swing		

Foulridge
Party	Candidate	Votes	%	±%
Conservative	Carol Belshaw	294	62.0	+7.3
Labour	Jillian Smith	114	24.1	−5.1
Liberal Democrats	David Stopforth	66	13.9	−2.2
Majority		180	38.0	+12.5
Turnout		474	35.6	−11.9
Conservative hold		Swing		

Higham and Pendleside
Party	Candidate	Votes	%	±%
Conservative	John Nutter	366	51.5	−25.2
Liberal Democrats	Valerie Skinner	279	39.2	+39.2
Labour	Sheila Wicks	66	9.3	−14.0
Majority		87	12.2	−41.3
Turnout		711	50.9	−2.8
Conservative hold		Swing		

Horsfield
Party	Candidate	Votes	%	±%
Liberal Democrats	Ann Kerrigan	490	41.8	
Independent	Peter Nowland	297	25.4	
Labour	Paul Broughton	213	18.2	
Conservative	Alexandra Thompson	135	11.5	
Socialist Alliance	Kevin Bean	36	3.1	
Majority		193	16.5	
Turnout		1,171	30.7	−5.6
Liberal Democrats hold		Swing		

Old Laund Booth
Party	Candidate	Votes	%	±%
Liberal Democrats	John David	555	80.1	−4.5
Conservative	Clive Bevan	138	19.9	+4.5
Majority		417	60.2	−9.1
Turnout		693	56.5	−6.2
Liberal Democrats hold		Swing		

Reedley
Party	Candidate	Votes	%	±%
Conservative	Tonia Barton	913	53.5	
Labour	Robert Allen	544	31.9	
Liberal Democrats	Shakeel Mirza	251	14.7	
Majority		369	21.6	
Turnout		1,708	44.2	−12.0
Conservative hold		Swing		

Southfield
Party	Candidate	Votes	%	±%
Liberal Democrats	Sonia Robinson	833	56.8	
Labour	Azhar Ali	377	25.7	
Conservative	Peter Wildman	138	9.4	
Independent	David Geddes	96	6.5	
Independent	Azar Ali	23	1.6	
Majority		456	31.1	
Turnout		1,467	39.8	+2.3
Liberal Democrats gain from Labour		Swing		

Vivary Bridge
Party	Candidate	Votes	%	±%
Liberal Democrats	Sharon Robinson	502	34.2	
BNP	Brian Parker	441	30.1	
Labour	Frank Allanson	375	25.6	
Conservative	James Farnell	148	10.1	
Majority		61	4.2	
Turnout		1,466	37.0	+1.4
Liberal Democrats gain from Labour		Swing		

Waterside
Party	Candidate	Votes	%	±%
Liberal Democrats	Ian Robinson	515	48.1	
Labour	Ian Tweedie	360	33.6	
Conservative	Maureen Regan	137	12.8	
Socialist Alliance	Richard MacSween	58	5.4	
Majority		155	14.5	
Turnout		1,070	30.1	−6.6
Liberal Democrats hold		Swing		
