= 2008 Pendle Borough Council election =

Outcome and key events of the 2008 Pendle Borough Council general election

Map of the results of the 2008 Pendle Borough Council election. Conservatives in blue, Labour in red, Liberal Democrats in yellow, British National Party in dark blue and independent in grey. Wards in dark grey were not contested in 2008.

The 2008 Pendle Borough Council election took place on 1 May 2008 to elect members of Pendle Borough Council in Lancashire, England. One third of the council was up for election and the Liberal Democrats lost overall control of the council to no overall control.

After the election, the composition of the council was

- Liberal Democrat 20
- Conservative 16
- Labour 10
- British National Party 2
- Independent 1

== Background ==
Before the election the Liberal Democrats held control of the council with 28 seats, but a loss of 4 seats would mean they lost their majority. 17 seats were contested in the election, with the Liberal Democrats defending 12, the Conservatives 4 and Labour 1 seat.

5 councillors stood down at the election, 2 Liberal Democrats from Bradley and Walverden wards, 2 Conservatives from Earby and Reedley and Labour's David Whalley from Vivary Bridge ward. Councillors who were defending seats included the leader of the council, Liberal Democrat Alan Davies, in Boulsworth, deputy mayor Marjorie Adams in Coates ward and the chairman of the Nelson committee David Foster in Clover Hill. The only candidates standing in the election not from the three main parties, were four from the British National Party and two independents.

== Campaign ==
The election saw complaints of voting fraud involving postal voting, leading to a police investigation and the matter being raised in Parliament by the local Member of Parliament Gordon Prentice. These allegations involved both the Liberal Democrat parliament candidate for Pendle constituency Afzal Anwar and Labour councillor Mohammed Tariq, after multiple postal votes were registered at their addresses. Both men denied doing anything and were supported by their parties, saying everyone registered at the addresses were entitled to vote. The police dropped the enquiry after concluding that there had been no wrongdoing.

During the campaign the national Liberal Democrat leader Nick Clegg visited Pendle to support his party.

== Election result ==
The results saw the Liberal Democrats lost their majority on the council after suffering a net loss of 8 seats. Defeated councillors for the Liberal Democrats included the leader of the council Alan Davies in Boulsworth, Nelson Committee chairman David Foster in Clover Hill, Shelley Franklin in Craven, Frank Wren in Brierfield and Judith Robinson in Southfield. The Liberal Democrats blamed their defeats on a targeted campaign by the Conservatives, while the Conservatives said the "tide is now turning towards us".

The Labour and Conservative parties both made significant gains from the Liberal Democrats. However Labour did lose one seat back to the Liberal Democrats in Vivary Bridge and the Conservatives lost a seat in Marsden to the British National Party. There was also a success for an independent candidate, with Glenn Whittaker taking Craven from the Liberal Democrats. These results meant the Liberal Democrats held 20 seats, the Conservatives 16, Labour 10, British National Party 2 as well as 1 independent. Overall turnout in the election was 41.58%.

Following the election the parties held talks on control of the council with reports that an agreement between the Conservative and Labour parties to take over from the Liberal Democrats was possible. However these were not successful and the new leader of the Liberal Democrats group, John David, became leader of the council at the head of a minority administration, after an 18–17 vote at the council meeting.

Pendle local election result 2008
Party	Seats	Gains	Losses	Net gain/loss	Seats %	Votes %	Votes	+/−
Conservative	6	3	1	+2	35.3	40.5	10,911	+5.9%
Labour	5	5	1	+4	29.4	23.0	6,183	+5.3%
Liberal Democrats	4	1	9	-8	23.5	29.5	7,954	-5.3%
BNP	1	1	0	+1	5.9	4.8	1,289	-2.2%
Independent	1	1	0	+1	5.9	2.2	602	-2.1%

== Ward results ==
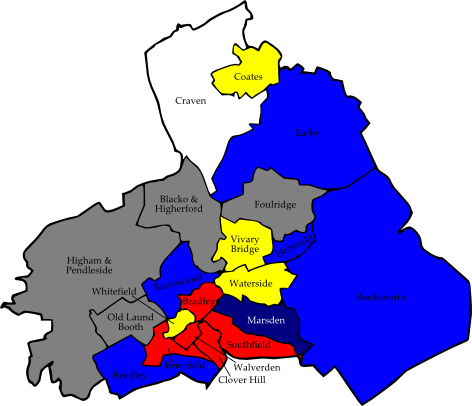
Map of the results of the 2008 Pendle Borough Council election with ward names.

Barrowford
Party	Candidate	Votes	%	±%
Conservative	Anthony Beckett	1,136	67.3	+0.4
Labour	Susan Nike	411	24.4	−0.9
Liberal Democrats	Michael Bradshaw	140	8.3	+0.5
Majority		725	43.0	+1.4
Turnout		1,687	42.4	+0.8
Conservative hold		Swing		

Boulsworth
Party	Candidate	Votes	%	±%
Conservative	Michael Calvert	1,189		
Conservative	George Askew	1,006		
Liberal Democrats	Alan Davies	663		
Liberal Democrats	David Robertson	618		
Labour	Gerard McCabe	133		
Labour	John Pope	69		
Turnout		3,678	48.4	
Conservative gain from Liberal Democrats		Swing		
Conservative gain from Liberal Democrats		Swing		

Bradley
Party	Candidate	Votes	%	±%
Labour	Mohammad Sakib	946	54.1	+10.1
Liberal Democrats	Jamil Mohammed	474	27.1	−7.2
Conservative	Zahid Chaudry	329	18.8	+4.1
Majority		472	27.0	+17.3
Turnout		1,749	39.3	−11.8
Labour gain from Liberal Democrats		Swing		

Brierfield
Party	Candidate	Votes	%	±%
Labour	Naeem Ashraf	863	47.2	+25.3
Conservative	Ann Jackson	632	34.6	+6.3
Liberal Democrats	Francis Wren	332	18.2	−31.5
Majority		231	12.6	
Turnout		1,827	49.7	−0.9
Labour gain from Liberal Democrats		Swing		

Clover Hill
Party	Candidate	Votes	%	±%
Labour	Eileen Ansar	624	37.7	+13.8
Liberal Democrats	David Foster	533	32.2	−0.6
Conservative	Timothy Eyre	496	30.0	+18.0
Majority		91	5.5	
Turnout		1,653	43.4	−2.1
Labour gain from Liberal Democrats		Swing		

Coates
Party	Candidate	Votes	%	±%
Liberal Democrats	Marjorie Adams	665	45.5	−4.2
Conservative	Keith Bailey	637	43.6	+29.9
Labour	William Skinner	158	10.8	+1.5
Majority		28	1.9	−20.4
Turnout		1,460	35.7	−1.8
Liberal Democrats hold		Swing		

Craven
Party	Candidate	Votes	%	±%
Independent	Glenn Whittaker	559	32.6	+5.3
Liberal Democrats	Shelley Franklin	437	25.5	−21.4
Conservative	Sandra Bunn	427	24.9	−0.9
BNP	Geoffrey Whitehead	235	13.7	+13.7
Labour	Robert Oliver	56	3.3	+3.3
Majority		122	7.1	
Turnout		1,714	48.9	+10.9
Independent gain from Liberal Democrats		Swing		

Earby
Party	Candidate	Votes	%	±%
Conservative	Valerie Langtree	1,248	69.5	+0.4
Liberal Democrats	Jacqueline Taylforth	325	18.1	+0.4
Labour	David Foat	223	12.4	−0.7
Majority		923	51.4	+0.0
Turnout		1,796	39.0	−1.9
Conservative hold		Swing		

Horsfield
Party	Candidate	Votes	%	±%
Conservative	Smith Benson	670	49.2	+28.1
Liberal Democrats	Dorothy Lord	507	37.2	−6.5
Labour	Anthony Hargreaves	185	13.6	−1.9
Majority		163	12.0	
Turnout		1,362	34.3	−3.3
Conservative gain from Liberal Democrats		Swing		

Marsden
Party	Candidate	Votes	%	±%
BNP	Adam Grant	412	39.1	+0.8
Conservative	Gary Rowland	339	32.2	+16.0
Labour	Dorothy Ormrod	221	21.0	−10.0
Liberal Democrats	Mark Upward	82	7.8	−6.7
Majority		73	6.9	−0.5
Turnout		1,054	41.1	−1.6
BNP gain from Conservative		Swing		

Reedley
Party	Candidate	Votes	%	±%
Conservative	Michael Blomeley	1,250	71.1	+7.5
Labour	Robert Allen	285	16.2	−3.6
Liberal Democrats	Mubashir Ali	224	12.7	−3.9
Majority		965	54.9	+11.1
Turnout		1,759	42.8	−4.3
Conservative hold		Swing		

Southfield
Party	Candidate	Votes	%	±%
Labour	Sheila Wicks	547	36.6	+13.3
Conservative	Paul McKenna	487	32.6	+14.5
Liberal Democrats	Judith Robinson	462	30.9	−9.7
Majority		60	4.0	
Turnout		1,496	37.1	−1.6
Labour gain from Liberal Democrats		Swing		

Vivary Bridge
Party	Candidate	Votes	%	±%
Liberal Democrats	Glennda Clegg	490	35.6	−10.3
Conservative	Geoffrey Riley	393	28.5	+8.9
BNP	Veronica Cullen	305	22.1	+2.6
Labour	Ian Tweedie	189	13.7	−1.4
Majority		97	7.0	−19.3
Turnout		1,377	33.8	−1.0
Liberal Democrats gain from Labour		Swing		

Walverden
Party	Candidate	Votes	%	±%
Labour	Mohammed Khalid	610	44.0	−6.9
Liberal Democrats	Asghar Ali	400	28.9	−8.3
Conservative	Barbara King	376	27.1	+15.3
Majority		210	15.2	+1.5
Turnout		1,386	51.6	+0.9
Labour gain from Liberal Democrats		Swing		

Waterside
Party	Candidate	Votes	%	±%
Liberal Democrats	Anthony Greaves	492	39.9	−2.2
BNP	Helen Mulligan	337	27.3	+7.4
Conservative	James Ilott	211	17.1	+5.1
Labour	Anthony Martin	151	12.2	−4.8
Independent	Ian Robinson	43	3.5	−1.0
Majority		155	12.6	−9.6
Turnout		1,234	33.1	−5.1
Liberal Democrats hold		Swing		

Whitefield
Party	Candidate	Votes	%	±%
Liberal Democrats	Nadeem Ahmed	1,110	65.0	+21.3
Labour	Mohammad Tariq	512	30.0	−21.7
Conservative	Victoria Landriau	85	5.0	+0.4
Majority		598	35.0	
Turnout		1,707	64.9	−6.8
Liberal Democrats hold		Swing		
