= 2022 Pendle Borough Council election =

The 2022 Pendle Borough Council election took place on 5 May 2022 to elect a third of Pendle Borough Council for the Borough of Pendle in England. This was on the same day as other English local elections. Twelve seats across ten wards were up for election.

The election resulted in the Conservatives maintaining control but with a reduced majority.

ConservativeParty			58.3%	17 / 33		
Labour Party	Mohammed Iqbal	3	25.0%	11 / 33	9,286	34.8%
Liberal Democrats	David Whipp	2	16.7%	5 / 33	4,164	15.6%
Green Party of England and Wales		0	0.0%	0 / 33	868	3.3%

== Ward results ==
Incumbent Councillors denoted by an asterisk (*).

=== Barnoldswick ===
Barnoldswick (1 seat)
Party	Candidate	Votes	%	±%
Liberal Democrats	Chris Church	1,087	54.0	+10.3
Conservative	Debbie Moore	565	28.1	−10.1
Labour	Euan Coulston	245	12.2	−3.1
Green	Sylvia Joyce Godfrey	117	5.8	N/A
Turnout		2,014	30.4	
Liberal Democrats hold		Swing		

=== Barrowford and Pendleside ===
Barrowford and Pendleside (2 seats)
Party	Candidate	Votes	%	±%
Conservative	Martyn Warren Stone	1,366	58.1	−7.3
Conservative	Nadeem Ahmed*	1,290	54.8	+8.8
Labour	Susan Frances Nike	958	40.7	+16.6
Labour	Robert Oliver	815	34.7	+16.6
Turnout		2,352	39.9	
Conservative hold		Swing		
Conservative hold		Swing		

=== Boulsworth and Foulridge ===
Boulsworth and Foulridge (1 seat)
Party	Candidate	Votes	%	±%
Conservative	Kevin John Salter	1,227	54.6	−1.6
Labour	Wayne Blackburn	457	20.3	+4.9
Liberal Democrats	Andrew John Latham MacDonald	409	18.2	−7.4
Green	Lyndsey Jane Taylor	153	6.8	N/A
Turnout		2,246	35.4	
Conservative hold		Swing		

=== Bradley ===
Bradley (1 seat)
Party	Candidate	Votes	%	±%
Conservative	Mohammad Kaleem	1,694	51.5	+9.8
Labour	Mohammad Sakib*	1,597	48.5	+5.8
Turnout		3,291	52.7	
Conservative gain from Labour		Swing		

=== Brierfield East and Clover Hill ===
Brierfield East and Clover Hill (1 seat)
Party	Candidate	Votes	%	±%
Labour	Sajjad Ahmed	1,579	48.3	+0.5
Conservative	Mohammed Arshad	1,471	45.0	+6.2
Liberal Democrats	Doris June Haigh	221	6.8	−2.4
Turnout		3,271	50.6	
Labour hold		Swing		

=== Earby and Coates ===
Earby and Coates (1 seat)
Party	Candidate	Votes	%	±%
Liberal Democrats	David Michael Baxter Whipp*	1,256	57.0	+12.4
Conservative	Miles Parris	752	34.1	−8.8
Green	Jane Veronica Bailes Wood	197	8.9	N/A
Turnout		2,205	34.4	
Liberal Democrats hold		Swing		

=== Marsden and Southfield ===
Marsden and Southfield (1 seat)
Party	Candidate	Votes	%	±%
Labour	Mohammad Ammer	1,176	55.6	+19.2
Conservative	Karen Howarth*	784	37.1	−11.0
Green	Paul James Graham	99	4.7	N/A
Liberal Democrats	Keith Ian Thornton	57	2.7	−2.2
Turnout		2,116	35.0	
Labour gain from Conservative		Swing		

=== Vivary Bridge ===
Vivary Bridge (2 seats)
Party	Candidate	Votes	%	±%
Conservative	Paul William McGladdery	708	49.4	+0.8
Conservative	Kieran McGladdery*	701	48.9	+1.2
Liberal Democrats	David Clegg	371	25.9	−6.7
Labour	Ann Marie Wrigley	356	24.8	+7.2
Liberal Democrats	Howard Philip Thomas	300	20.9	−2.6
Labour	Manzar Iqbal	259	18.1	+0.1
Turnout		1,434	26.9	
Conservative hold		Swing		
Conservative hold		Swing		

=== Waterside and Horsfield ===
Waterside and Horsfield (1 seat)
Party	Candidate	Votes	%	±%
Conservative	Neil Butterworth*	756	46.2	+7.2
Liberal Democrats	Alice Rosemary Mann	463	28.3	−9.2
Labour	David Kenneth Foat	321	19.6	+1.5
Green	Karan Leslie	97	5.9	N/A
Turnout		1,637	29.3	
Conservative hold		Swing		

=== Whitefield and Walverden ===
Whitefield and Walverden (1 seat)
Party	Candidate	Votes	%	±%
Labour	Thabasum Ruby Anwar*	1,523	56.7	−0.9
Conservative	Chaudhary Usman Zaman	1,068	39.7	+8.8
Green	Annette Irene Marti	96	3.6	−0.6
Turnout		2,687	41.4	
Labour hold		Swing		

== Barrowford and Pendleside By-Election ==
Following the death of Councillor Carlo Lionti (elected 2021), a by-election was held in the Barrowford and Pendleside ward on 15 December 2022. The winner will serve a 6 month term expiring at the 2023 council election.

December 2022 Barrowford and Pendleside By-Election
Party	Candidate	Votes	%	±%
Conservative	David Harry Gallear	699	57.3	
Labour	Susan Frances Nike	436	35.7	
Liberal Democrats	Allan Vickerman	84	6.9	
Turnout		1,220	20.6	
Conservative hold		Swing		
