= 2004 Pendle Borough Council election =

2004 UK local government election

Map of the results of the 2004 Pendle Borough Council election. Liberal Democrats in yellow, Conservatives in blue and Labour in red. Wards in dark grey were not contested in 2004.

The 2004 Pendle Borough Council election took place on 10 June 2004 to elect members of Pendle Borough Council in Lancashire, England. One third of the council was up for election and the Liberal Democrats gained overall control of the council from no overall control.

After the election, the composition of the council was

- Liberal Democrat 30
- Conservative 11
- Labour 8

== Campaign ==
Before the election the Liberal Democrats were the largest party on the council with 24 seats, but without a majority as there were 13 Labour, 11 Conservative and 1 independent councillors. The election had 16 seats being contested by a total of 58 candidates. Both the Labour and Conservative parties contested every seat, while the Liberal Democrats had candidates in 15 seats. The other candidates were 8 from the British National Party, 2 independents and 1 from the United Kingdom Independence Party. 12 sitting councillors defended their seats, with a further 2, Judith Robinson and Fred Hartley, contesting different wards to the ones they held. Several previous councillors also attempted to win back seats on the council including Lord Tony Greaves for the Liberal Democrats.

The election was held under all postal voting and took place at the same time as the 2004 European election.

== Election result ==
The results saw the Liberal Democrats win a majority on the council, after gaining 5 seats from Labour and 1 from an independent. The Liberal Democrats took 11 of the 16 seats contested, with gains in Nelson which previously had been a strongly Labour area, to hold 30 of the 49 seats on the council. Labour losses included 3 sitting councillors in the wards of Brierfield, Clover Hill and Whitefield, and the party dropped to fourth place in other wards.

Meanwhile, the Conservatives held the seats they had been defending and came within 8 votes of defeating the Liberal Democrat leader of the council Alan Davies. No other group won any seats, but the British National Party, standing in half of the wards, won 10% of the vote and came second in some seats.

Following the election the Liberal Democrats took all 10 seats on the council executive.

Pendle local election result 2004
Party	Seats	Gains	Losses	Net gain/loss	Seats %	Votes %	Votes	+/−
Liberal Democrats	11	6	0	+6	68.8	41.0	12,446	-3.5%
Conservative	3	0	0	0	18.8	23.1	7,021	-0.9%
Labour	2	0	5	-5	12.5	22.7	6,871	+1.3%
BNP	0	0	0	0	0	10.6	3,219	+3.3%
Independent	0	0	1	-1	0	2.0	603	-0.2%
UKIP	0	0	0	0	0	0.6	170	+0.6%

== Ward results ==
Barrowford
Party	Candidate	Votes	%	±%
Conservative	Anthony Beckett	873	41.9	+10.9
Liberal Democrats	Michael Simpson	649	31.2	+1.8
BNP	Trevor Dawson	385	18.5	−8.0
Labour	Jillian Smith	176	8.4	−4.8
Majority		224	10.8	+9.2
Turnout		2,083	52.9	+6.4
Conservative hold		Swing		

Boulsworth
Party	Candidate	Votes	%	±%
Liberal Democrats	Alan Davies	747	35.9	
Conservative	Michael Calvert	739	35.6	
BNP	Thomas Boocock	413	19.9	
Labour	David Johns	179	8.6	
Majority		8	0.4	
Turnout		2,078	53.6	+17.0
Liberal Democrats hold		Swing		

Bradley
Party	Candidate	Votes	%	±%
Liberal Democrats	Donna Caley	1,239	52.0	−10.4
Labour	Mohammad Sakib	971	40.8	+3.2
Conservative	Victoria Landriau	171	7.2	+7.2
Majority		268	11.3	−13.6
Turnout		2,381	56.7	+9.8
Liberal Democrats gain from Independent		Swing		

Brierfield
Party	Candidate	Votes	%	±%
Liberal Democrats	Francis Wren	1,024	49.9	−0.9
Conservative	Ann Tattersall	547	26.6	+6.1
Labour	Pauline Allen	483	23.5	−1.9
Majority		477	23.2	−2.2
Turnout		2,054	56.4	+11.5
Liberal Democrats gain from Labour		Swing		

Clover Hill
Party	Candidate	Votes	%	±%
Liberal Democrats	David Foster	1,109	57.7	+13.9
BNP	Michael Brennan	342	17.8	−8.0
Labour	Neil Akrigg	325	16.9	−8.5
Conservative	Michael Landriau	147	7.6	+2.6
Majority		767	39.9	+21.9
Turnout		1,923	51.7	+4.0
Liberal Democrats gain from Labour		Swing		

Coates
Party	Candidate	Votes	%	±%
Liberal Democrats	Marjorie Adams	1,057	54.1	−1.3
BNP	John Stonnell	434	22.2	+0.1
Conservative	Barbara Davison	250	12.8	+6.5
Labour	William Skinner	211	10.8	+0.9
Majority		623	31.9	−1.4
Turnout		1,952	48.9	+4.1
Liberal Democrats hold		Swing		

Craven
Party	Candidate	Votes	%	±%
Liberal Democrats	Mary Norcross	899	44.1	−9.6
BNP	Geoffrey Whitehead	447	21.9	+21.9
Conservative	Valerie Langtree	290	14.2	+1.3
Labour	Helen Ingham	232	11.4	−22.0
UKIP	Dorothy Baxter	170	8.3	+8.3
Majority		452	22.2	+2.0
Turnout		2,038	49.9	+9.1
Liberal Democrats hold		Swing		

Earby
Party	Candidate	Votes	%	±%
Conservative	Rosemary Carroll	998	44.1	−4.9
Liberal Democrats	Timothy Haigh	549	24.3	−14.9
BNP	Brian Parker	432	19.1	+19.1
Labour	David Foat	284	12.5	+0.7
Majority		449	19.8	+10.1
Turnout		2,263	52.0	+13.4
Conservative hold		Swing		

Horsfield
Party	Candidate	Votes	%	±%
Liberal Democrats	Dorothy Lord	659	35.3	−6.5
BNP	Anthony Locke	364	19.5	+19.5
Independent	Peter Nowland	356	19.1	−6.3
Labour	Gerard McCabe	302	16.2	−2.0
Conservative	Janet Riley	186	10.0	−1.5
Majority		295	15.8	−0.7
Turnout		1,867	48.2	+17.5
Liberal Democrats hold		Swing		

Marsden
Party	Candidate	Votes	%	±%
Labour	Gary Rowland	512	44.8	
Conservative	Benjamin Gascoigne	384	33.6	
Independent	Frederick Hartley	247	21.6	
Majority		128	11.2	
Turnout		1,143	45.5	+7.3
Labour hold		Swing		

Reedley
Party	Candidate	Votes	%	±%
Conservative	Willie Clegg	1,201	54.8	+1.3
Labour	Robert Allen	547	25.0	−6.9
Liberal Democrats	Shahzad Abdullah	442	20.2	+5.5
Majority		654	29.9	+8.3
Turnout		2,190	54.8	+10.6
Conservative hold		Swing		

Southfield
Party	Candidate	Votes	%	±%
Liberal Democrats	Judith Robinson	905	53.8	−3.0
Labour	Sheila Wicks	506	30.1	+4.4
Conservative	Peter Wildman	270	16.1	+6.7
Majority		399	23.7	−7.4
Turnout		1,681	45.5	+5.7
Liberal Democrats gain from Labour		Swing		

Vivary Bridge
Party	Candidate	Votes	%	±%
Labour	David Whalley	582	33.5	+7.9
Liberal Democrats	David Robinson	488	28.1	−6.1
BNP	Robert Cottage	402	23.2	−6.9
Conservative	Harold Ryder	263	15.2	+5.1
Majority		94	5.4	
Turnout		1,735	43.2	+6.2
Labour hold		Swing		

Walverden
Party	Candidate	Votes	%	±%
Liberal Democrats	Murtazah Zaman	800	51.3	
Labour	Frank Allanson	425	27.2	
Conservative	Ann Jackson	335	21.5	
Majority		375	24.0	
Turnout		1,560	60.5	+8.5
Liberal Democrats hold		Swing		

Waterside
Party	Candidate	Votes	%	±%
Liberal Democrats	Anthony Greaves	816	55.6	+7.5
Labour	Ian Tweedie	395	26.9	−6.7
Conservative	Maureen Regan	257	17.5	+4.7
Majority		421	28.7	+14.2
Turnout		1,468	40.5	+10.4
Liberal Democrats gain from Labour		Swing		

Whitefield
Party	Candidate	Votes	%	±%
Liberal Democrats	Nadeem Ahmed	1,063	55.5	
Labour	Asjad Mahmood	741	38.7	
Conservative	Michelle Ainsworth	110	5.7	
Majority		322	16.8	
Turnout		1,914	78.2	+8.1
Liberal Democrats gain from Labour		Swing		
