= 2024 Pendle Borough Council election =

2024 English local election

← 2023	2 May 2024	2026 →

12 of 33 seats on Pendle Borough Council 17 seats needed for a majority

	First party	Second party	Third party
Leader	Nadeem Ahmed		David Whipp
Party	Conservative	Independent	Liberal Democrats
Last election	14 seats, 40.2%	1 seat, 0%	7 seats, 15.9%
Seats before	13	12	7
Seats won	4	5	3
Seats after	13	12	8
Seat change	▼1	▲7	▲1
Popular vote	7,703	7,448	3,356
Percentage	34.5%	33.4%	15.0%
Swing	▼5.7%	▲33.4%	▼0.9%
	Fourth party	Fifth party
Party	Labour	Green
Last election	11 seats, 39.7%	0 seats, 0%
Seats before	0	0
Seats won	0	0
Seats after	0	0
Seat change	▼11	Steady
Popular vote	3,285	508
Percentage	14.7%	2.2%
Swing	▼25.0%	▼1.8%
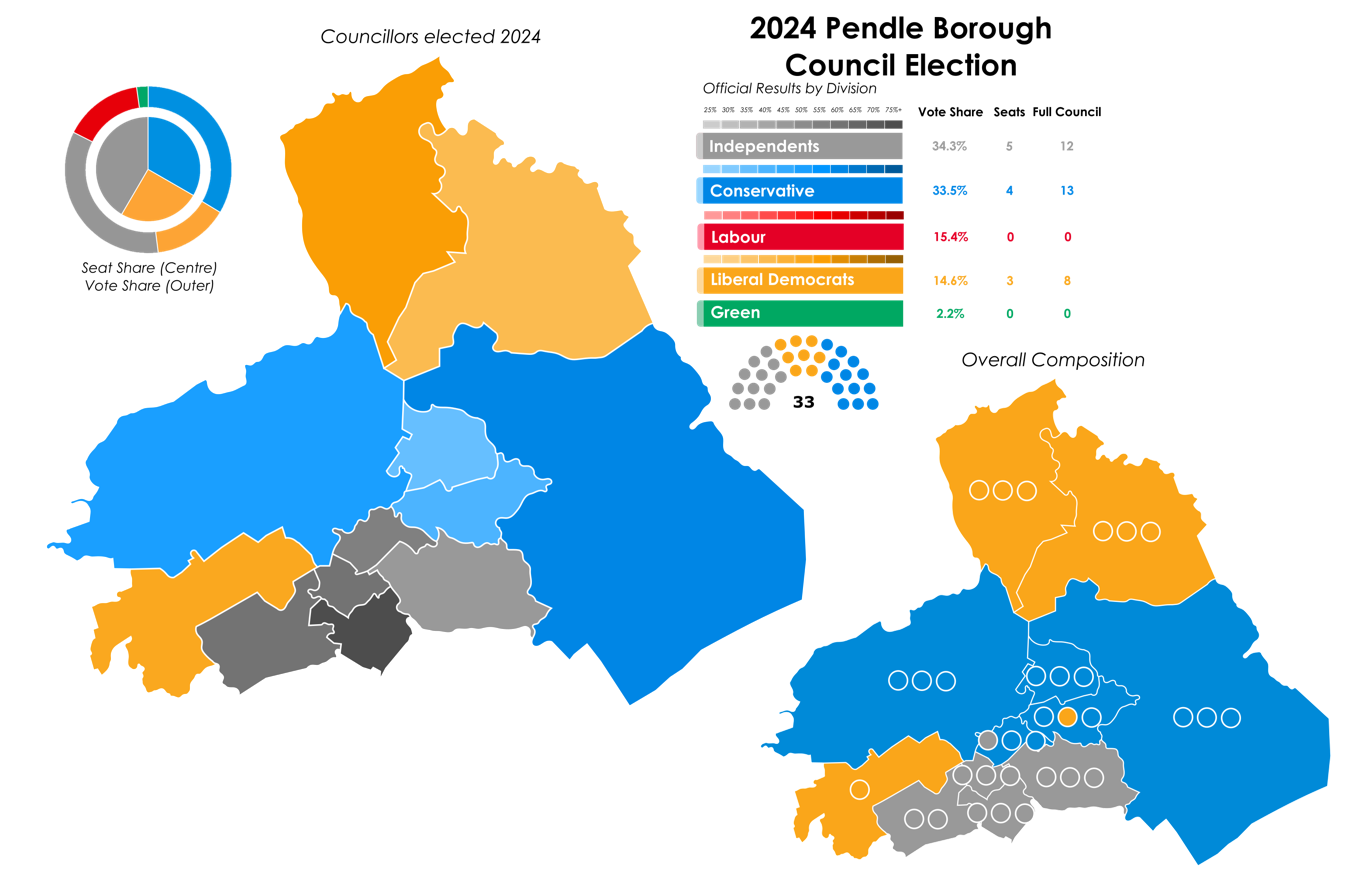
Leader before election
Asjad Mahmood
Independent
No overall control
Leader after election
Asjad Mahmood
Independent
No overall control

The 2024 Pendle Borough Council election took place on 2 May 2024 to elect a third of the council for the Borough of Pendle in Lancashire, England, on the same day as other local elections in England.

The council was under no overall control prior to the election. It had been governed by a coalition of Labour and the Liberal Democrats until the entire Labour caucus left the party in April 2024.

Labour lost all their seats they were defending to Independents. Following the election the Independent Group (being the former Labour councillors) and the Liberal Democrats continued to run the council.

== Ward results ==
Incumbent councillors denoted by an asterisk (*). These seats were last up for election when new ward boundaries were introduced in 2021 - percentage changes are calculated based on the mean party result in 2021.

=== Barnoldswick ===
Barnoldswick
Party	Candidate	Votes	%	±%
Liberal Democrats	Tom Whipp*	1,009	58.3	+7.5
Conservative	Carol Ann Goulthorp	377	21.8	−9.4
Labour	Euan Coulston	260	15.0	−0.3
Green	Sylvia Joyce Godfrey	84	4.9	N/A
Majority		632	36.5	
Turnout		1,730	26.4	
Liberal Democrats hold		Swing		

* Elected as a Liberal Democrat Councillor for Barnoldswick in 2021.

=== Barrowford and Pendleside ===
Barrowford and Pendleside
Party	Candidate	Votes	%	±%
Conservative	Nadeem Ahmed*	1,099	51.4	−14.0
Labour	Susan Frances Nike	888	41.5	+17.4
Liberal Democrats	Philip Alfred Berry	153	7.1	+0.1
Majority		211	211	
Turnout		2,140	36.2	
Conservative hold		Swing		

* Elected as a Conservative Councillor for Barrowford and Pendleside in 2022.

=== Boulsworth and Foulridge ===
Boulsworth and Foulridge
Party	Candidate	Votes	%	±%
Conservative	Sarah Elizabeth Cockburn-Price*	1,254	63.0	−0.4
Labour	Wayne Blackburn	457	22.9	+7.5
Liberal Democrats	Robin Hargreaves	158	7.9	−17.7
Green	Lyndsey Taylor	123	6.2	N/A
Majority		797	40.1	
Turnout		1,992	31.6	
Conservative hold		Swing		

* Elected as a Conservative Councillor for Boulsworth and Foulridge in 2021.

=== Bradley ===
Bradley
Party	Candidate	Votes	%	±%
No Label	Mohammed Iqbal*	1665	55.2	+4.9
Conservative	Hassan Mahmood	1351	44.8	+3.3
Majority		314	10.4	
Turnout		3,016	48.3	
Independent gain from Labour		Swing		

* Elected as a Labour Councillor for Bradley in 2021, defected to the Independent Group in April 2024.

=== Brierfield East and Clover Hill ===
Brierfield East and Clover Hill
Party	Candidate	Votes	%	±%
Independent	Naeem Hussain Ashraf*	1789	75.3	+20.6
Conservative	Adam Jake Brierley	586	24.7	−14.1
Majority		1203	50.6	
Turnout		2375	38.1	
Independent gain from Labour		Swing		

* Elected as a Labour Councillor for Brierfield East and Clover Hill in 2021, defected to the Independent Group in April 2024.

=== Brierfield West and Reedley ===
Brierfield West and Reedley
Party	Candidate	Votes	%	±%
No Label	Mohammed Hanif*	1365	62.0	-4.2
Conservative	Pauline Anne McCormick	362	16.4	−12.5
No Label	Sajjad Akbar	300	13.6	−8.2
Labour	Isaac Shafi Iqbal	176	8.0	−58.2
Majority		1003	45.6	
Turnout		2203	48.2	
Independent gain from Labour		Swing		

* Elected as a Labour Councillor for Brierfield West and Reedley in 2021, defected to the Independent Group in April 2024.

=== Earby and Coates ===
Earby and Coates
Party	Candidate	Votes	%	±%
Liberal Democrats	David Hartley	892	44.8	+13.4
Conservative	Richard Rutherford	637	32.0	−16.0
Labour	David Philip Johns	353	17.7	+3.3
Green	Jane Veronica Bailes Wood	111	5.6	N/A
Majority		255	12.8	
Turnout		1993	31.1	
Liberal Democrats gain from Conservative		Swing		

=== Fence and Higham ===
Fence and Higham
Party	Candidate	Votes	%	±%
Liberal Democrats	Brian Newman*	442	53.9	+2.4
Conservative	Howard Hartley	378	46.1	−2.4
Majority		64	7.8	
Turnout		820	41.7	
Liberal Democrats hold		Swing		

* Elected as a Liberal Democrat Councillor for Fence and Higham in 2021..

=== Marsden and Southfield ===
Marsden and Southfield
Party	Candidate	Votes	%	±%
No Label	Mohammad Adnan*	962	45.8	-5.9
Independent	Neil McGowan†	441	21.0	−17.7
Conservative	Marie Stone	376	17.9	−33.8
Labour	Elliot Christian Gribble	261	12.4	−24.0
No Label	Azim Akhtar Khan	44	2.1	N/A
No Label	Craig Ian McBeth	16	0.8	N/A
Majority		521	24.8	
Turnout		2100	35.0	
Independent gain from Conservative		Swing		

* Elected as a Conservative Councillor for Marsden and Southfield in 2021, defected to Labour, and then the Independent Group.
† Elected as a Conservative Councillor for Marsden and Southfield in 2021, stood down in 2023.

=== Vivary Bridge ===
Vivary Bridge
Party	Candidate	Votes	%	±%
Conservative	Richard O’Connor	458	38.9	−9.7
Liberal Democrats	Andy Bell	370	31.4	−1.2
Labour	Patricia Josephine Hannah-Wood	269	22.8	+4.8
Green	Benjamin Harrop	81	6.9	N/A
Majority		88	7.5	
Turnout		1,178	21.9	
Conservative hold		Swing		

=== Waterside and Horsfield ===
Waterside and Horsfield
Party	Candidate	Votes	%	±%
Conservative	Ash Sutcliffe*	581	40.2	−6.0
Labour	Graham Roach	424	29.3	+11.2
Liberal Democrats	Craig Anthony Edwards	332	23.0	−14.5
Green	David Richard John Penney	109	7.5	N/A
Majority		157	10.9	
Turnout		1,446	25.7	
Conservative hold		Swing		

* Elected as a Conservative Councillor for Waterside and Horsfield in 2021.

=== Whitefield and Walverden ===
Whitefield and Walverden
Party	Candidate	Votes	%	±%
No Label	Asjad Mahmood*	1,307	64.8	+2.3
Labour	Manzar Iqbal	466	23.1	−39.4
Conservative	Mohamad Irfan Ayub	244	12.1	−13.2
Majority		841	10.4	
Turnout		2,017	41.7	
Independent gain from Labour		Swing		

* Elected as a Labour Councillor for Whitefield and Walverden in 2021, defected to the Independent Group in April 2024.

== By-elections ==
=== Vivary Bridge (March 2025) ===
Vivary Bridge by-election 6 March 2025
Party	Candidate	Votes	%	±%
Liberal Democrats	Andy Bell	388	34.9	+3.5
Reform	Nathan McCollum	358	32.2	+32.2
Conservative	Sean Kelly	244	22.0	−16.9
Labour	Philip Heyworth	121	10.9	−11.9
Majority		30	2.7	
Turnout			20.7	
Liberal Democrats gain from Conservative		Swing		

=== Vivary Bridge (May 2025) ===
Vivary Bridge by-election 1 May 2025
Party	Candidate	Votes	%	±%
Reform	Marion Atkinson	689	43.9	+43.9
Liberal Democrats	David Clegg	468	29.8	−1.6
Conservative	Julie Green	258	22.0	−22.5
Labour	Philip Heyworth	106	6.7	−16.1
Green	Benjamin Harrop	50	3.2	−3.7
Majority		221	14.1	
Turnout		1,571		
Reform gain from Conservative		Swing		

=== Barnoldswick ===
Barnoldswick by-election: 27 November 2025
Party	Candidate	Votes	%	±%
Liberal Democrats	Bryony Hartley	1,008	59.8	+1.5
Reform	Mick Waddington	441	26.2	N/A
Conservative	Jane Pratt	170	10.1	–11.7
Labour	Euan Clouston	66	3.9	–11.1
Majority		567	33.6	–2.9
Turnout		1,685	25.8	–0.6
Registered electors		6,546		
Liberal Democrats hold				
