= 2012 Pendle Borough Council election =

2012 UK local government election

Map of the results of the 2012 Pendle Borough Council election. Labour in red, Conservatives in blue and Liberal Democrats in yellow. Wards in dark grey were not contested in 2012.

The 2012 Pendle Borough Council election took place on 3 May 2012 to elect members of Pendle Borough Council in Lancashire, England. One third of the council was up for election and the council stayed under no overall control.

After the election, the composition of the council was:

- Conservative 18
- Labour 18
- Liberal Democrats 12
- British National Party 1

== Background ==
Before the election the Conservatives had 18 seats on the council, Labour 16, the Liberal Democrats 12, British National Party 2 and there was 1 independent. 17 seats were contested, with 2 seats available in Boulsworth after Conservative councillor George Askew resigned his seat on the council. This meant the Conservatives were defending 6 seats, Labour 5, Liberal Democrats 4 and the British National Party 1 seat.

Among those standing down at the election was the Conservative leader of the council, Mile Blomeley from Reedley ward for health reasons, as well as Conservatives Valerie Langtree from Earby ward and Mike Calvert from Boulsworth ward, independent Glenn Whitaker from Craven ward and Labour's Mohammed Khalid from Walverden ward. As well as candidates from the Conservative, Labour and Liberal Democrat parties, there were 4 Green Party candidates, 3 from the British National Party and 1 each from the Democratic Nationalists, English Democrats and UK Independence Party.

== Election result ==
Labour gained seats in Reedley from the Conservatives and Vivary Bridge from the Liberal Democrats, to move level with the Conservatives on 18 seats each, while the Liberal Democrats remained on 12 seats after taking Craven ward where the only independent had stood down. The only other change saw one of the two British National Party councillors lose his seat to the Conservatives in Marsden ward by 37 votes. Overall turnout at the election was 37.8%.

Joe Cooney was elected as the new leader of the Conservative group on the council, and then became leader of the council, after having only been a councillor for 12 months. This came after the Conservatives and Liberal Democrats agreed a coalition to run the council with 6 Conservatives and 4 Liberal Democrats on the council executive.

Following the election the Conservative member of parliament for Pendle, Andrew Stephenson, alleged that had been electoral fraud involving postal votes at the council election particularly pointing to the results in Reedley ward over the last two elections. 3 complaints regarding postal votes were investigated by the police, while councillors set up a working group to look at concerns.

Pendle local election result 2012
Party	Seats	Gains	Losses	Net gain/loss	Seats %	Votes %	Votes	+/−
Labour	7	2	0	+2	41.2	40.2	9,873	+3.0
Conservative	6	1	1	0	35.3	29.9	7,344	-11.3
Liberal Democrats	4	1	1	0	23.5	23.0	5,665	+5.0
BNP	0	0	1	-1	0.0	2.8	684	+1.0
Green	0	0	0	0	0.0	1.7	425	+1.7
English Democrat	0	0	0	0	0.0	1.3	311	+0.3
UKIP	0	0	0	0	0.0	0.8	193	+0.6
Democratic Nationalists	0	0	0	0	0.0	0.4	92	+0.4
Independent	0	0	1	-1	0.0	0.0	0	+0.0

== Ward results ==
Barrowford
Party	Candidate	Votes	%	±%
Conservative	Anthony Beckett	918	60.1	+2.3
Labour	Sue Nike	609	39.9	−2.3
Majority		309	20.2	+4.6
Turnout		1,527	38.0	−7.0
Conservative hold		Swing		

Boulsworth (2 seats)
Party	Candidate	Votes	%	±%
Conservative	Margaret Foxley	639		
Conservative	John McBeth	562		
Labour	Julian Jordan	349		
Labour	David Foat	308		
Liberal Democrats	Heather Greaves	211		
BNP	John Rowe	181		
Liberal Democrats	Mary Thomas	155		
Green	Rowen Hartley-Fish	141		
Turnout		2,546	32.6	−12.1
Conservative hold		Swing		
Conservative hold		Swing		

Bradley
Party	Candidate	Votes	%	±%
Labour	Mohammad Sakib	1,178	55.0	−15.5
Liberal Democrats	Shoaib Ahmed	700	32.7	+23.7
Conservative	Timothy Eyre	147	6.9	−4.6
Green	Stuart Oxbrow	118	5.5	+5.5
Majority		478	22.3	−36.7
Turnout		2,143	45.9	+4.2
Labour hold		Swing		

Brierfield
Party	Candidate	Votes	%	±%
Labour	Naeem Ashraf	1,102	67.9	+3.8
Conservative	Jack Gregory	520	32.1	−3.8
Majority		582	35.9	+7.7
Turnout		1,622	44.3	−4.7
Labour hold		Swing		

Clover Hill
Party	Candidate	Votes	%	±%
Labour	Eileen Ansar	848	61.2	+9.8
Conservative	Janice Taylor	281	20.3	−3.5
BNP	Veronica Cullen	149	10.8	+0.1
Liberal Democrats	Philip Berry	108	7.8	−6.3
Majority		567	40.9	+13.2
Turnout		1,386	36.5	−3.8
Labour hold		Swing		

Coates
Party	Candidate	Votes	%	±%
Liberal Democrats	Marjorie Adams	726	55.2	+9.7
Conservative	Keith Bailey	372	28.3	−6.5
Labour	Christopher McKimm	218	16.6	−3.1
Majority		354	26.9	+16.2
Turnout		1,316	31.7	−10.0
Liberal Democrats hold		Swing		

Craven
Party	Candidate	Votes	%	±%
Liberal Democrats	Ken Hartley	615	43.8	+4.0
Conservative	Suzanne Langtree	376	26.8	−15.7
Labour	David Johns	220	15.7	−2.1
UKIP	Dorothy Baxter	193	13.7	+13.7
Majority		239	17.0	
Turnout		1,404	32.5	−10.2
Liberal Democrats gain from Independent		Swing		

Earby
Party	Candidate	Votes	%	±%
Conservative	Rosemary Carroll	712	41.3	−12.4
Labour	Robert Oliver	356	20.7	−3.4
Liberal Democrats	Doris Haigh	343	19.9	+10.0
English Democrat	James Jackman	311	18.1	+5.8
Majority		356	20.7	−9.0
Turnout		1,722	35.5	−9.1
Conservative hold		Swing		

Horsfield
Party	Candidate	Votes	%	±%
Conservative	Alan Benson	515	40.4	+7.0
Liberal Democrats	James Kerrigan	386	30.3	−7.6
Labour	Tony Hargreaves	375	29.4	+0.7
Majority		129	10.1	
Turnout		1,276	32.9	−4.3
Conservative hold		Swing		

Marsden
Party	Candidate	Votes	%	±%
Conservative	Tommy Cooney	391	37.7	+10.4
BNP	Adam Grant	354	34.2	+3.7
Labour	Azhar Ali	291	28.1	−0.7
Majority		37	3.6	
Turnout		1,036	39.8	−22.6
Conservative gain from BNP		Swing		

Reedley
Party	Candidate	Votes	%	±%
Labour	Mohammad Hanif	1,034	48.5	−4.9
Conservative	Tonia Barton	917	43.0	−3.6
Liberal Democrats	James Wood	181	8.5	+8.5
Majority		117	5.5	−1.3
Turnout		2,132	50.1	−4.7
Labour gain from Conservative		Swing		

Southfield
Party	Candidate	Votes	%	±%
Labour	Sheila Wicks	847	68.7	+14.8
Liberal Democrats	Abubaker Anwar	196	15.9	+3.2
Conservative	Paul Pratt	190	15.4	−7.2
Majority		651	52.8	+21.5
Turnout		1,233	30.1	−10.1
Labour hold		Swing		

Vivary Bridge
Party	Candidate	Votes	%	±%
Labour	Ian Tweedie	389	32.0	+0.3
Conservative	Keith Wilkinson	369	30.3	−7.4
Liberal Democrats	Glennda Clegg	367	30.2	−0.1
Green	Leah Jamieson	91	7.5	+7.5
Majority		20	1.6	
Turnout		1,216	28.9	−7.0
Labour gain from Liberal Democrats		Swing		

Walverden
Party	Candidate	Votes	%	±%
Labour	Abdul Aziz	783	74.7	+36.4
Conservative	Neil McGowan	265	25.3	−1.6
Majority		518	49.4	+45.8
Turnout		1,048	39.5	−28.5
Labour hold		Swing		

Waterside
Party	Candidate	Votes	%	±%
Liberal Democrats	Anthony Greaves	564	47.6	+3.7
Labour	Ian Graham	343	29.0	+1.4
Conservative	Geoffrey Riley	110	9.3	−6.2
Democratic Nationalists	Gary Topping	92	7.8	+7.8
Green	David Penney	75	6.3	+6.3
Majority		221	18.7	+2.5
Turnout		1,184	30.7	−5.5
Liberal Democrats hold		Swing		

Whitefield
Party	Candidate	Votes	%	±%
Liberal Democrats	Nadeem Ahmed	1,113	62.0	+26.8
Labour	Sajid Ali	623	34.7	−22.3
Conservative	Margaret Beckett	60	3.3	−4.6
Majority		490	27.3	
Turnout		1,796	65.9	−7.3
Liberal Democrats hold		Swing		

== By-elections between 2012 and 2014 ==
=== Coates ===
A by-election took place on 2 May 2013 after the resignation from the council of Liberal Democrat councillor Janine Throup. The seat was held for the Liberal Democrats by Claire Teall by a majority of 196 votes.

Coates By-Election 2 May 2013
Party	Candidate	Votes	%	±%
Liberal Democrats	Claire Teall	623	49.0	−6.2
Conservative	Michael Thompson	427	33.6	+5.3
Labour	Christopher McKimm	221	17.4	+0.8
Majority		196	15.4	−11.5
Turnout		1,271	30.9	−0.8
Liberal Democrats hold		Swing		

=== Blacko and Higherford ===
A by-election was held in Blacko and Higherford after Conservative councillor Shelagh Derwent was disqualified from the council after not attending meetings for 6 months. The seat was held for the Conservatives by Noel McEvoy with 370 votes, double the vote of the other 3 candidates.

Blacko and Higherford By-Election 3 April 2014
Party	Candidate	Votes	%	±%
Conservative	Noel McEvoy	370	66.7	−13.1
UKIP	Michael Waddington	86	15.5	+15.5
Labour	Robert Oliver	65	11.7	−8.5
Liberal Democrats	Darren Raynolds	34	6.1	+6.1
Majority		284	51.2	−8.3
Turnout		555	38.3	−11.4
Conservative hold		Swing		
