= 2006 Pendle Borough Council election =

2006 UK local government election

Map of the results of the 2006 Pendle Borough Council election. Liberal Democrats in yellow, Conservatives in blue, Labour in red and British National Party in dark blue. Wards in dark grey were not contested in 2006.

The 2006 Pendle Borough Council election took place on 4 May 2006 to elect members of Pendle Borough Council in Lancashire, England. One third of the council was up for election and the Liberal Democrats stayed in overall control of the council.

After the election, the composition of the council was:

- Liberal Democrat 30
- Conservative 13
- Labour 5
- British National Party 1

== Background ==
Before the election the Liberal Democrats held a majority with 29 seats, compared to 11 for the Conservatives, 7 for Labour and 1 seat was vacant. 18 of the 49 seats on the council were contested at the election, with 2 seats available in Reedley and Vivary Bridge wards. Candidates in the election came from the Conservative, Labour and Liberal Democrat parties, as well as 7 from the British National Party.

== Election result ==
The results saw the Liberal Democrats retain a majority on the council, while the British National Party won a first seat on the council. Brian Parker gained Marsden for the British National Party from Labour by 80 votes, with the leader of the British National Party Nick Griffin saying he was "very pleased" and hoped "we can go on and progress in the future". However the other parties expressed concern over the success for the British National Party. Meanwhile, among the other successful candidates in the election was Liberal Democrat Naseem Shabnam, who became the first Asian woman councillor in Pendle after being elected in Brierfield ward. Overall turnout in the election was 43.03%.

Later in May Mohammed Iqbal was elected as the new leader of the Labour group on the council, after the previous leader Frank Clifford stood down at the election. Also towards the end of the month, councillor Marlene Hill-Crane quit the Liberal Democrats to sit as an independent, due to a dispute over the regeneration of a former school.

Pendle local election result 2006
Party	Seats	Gains	Losses	Net gain/loss	Seats %	Votes %	Votes	+/−
Liberal Democrats	9	2	2	0	50.0	40.6	11,547	-0.4%
Conservative	4	1	0	+1	22.2	26.0	7,407	+2.9%
Labour	4	1	3	-2	22.2	23.0	6,556	+0.3%
BNP	1	1	0	+1	5.6	10.4	2,953	-0.2%

== Ward results ==
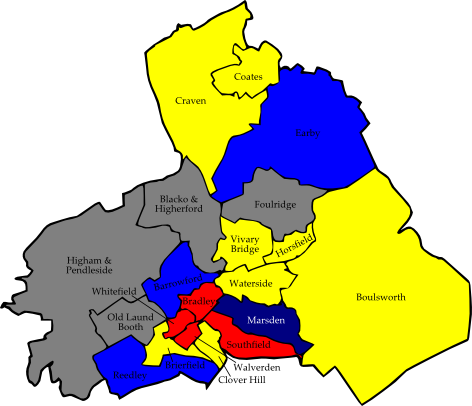
Map of the results of the 2006 Pendle Borough Council election with ward names.

Barrowford
Party	Candidate	Votes	%	±%
Conservative	Jonathan Eyre	740	45.2	+3.3
Liberal Democrats	Allan Vickerman	712	43.5	+12.3
Labour	Christine Stables	185	11.3	+2.9
Majority		28	1.7	−9.1
Turnout		1,637	41.7	−11.2
Conservative gain from Liberal Democrats		Swing		

Boulsworth
Party	Candidate	Votes	%	±%
Liberal Democrats	Aaron Hurst	681	37.0	+1.1
Conservative	Violet Vaughan	572	31.1	−4.5
BNP	Thomas Boocock	463	25.2	+5.3
Labour	Jillian Allanson	123	6.7	−1.9
Majority		109	5.9	+5.5
Turnout		1,839	46.4	−7.2
Liberal Democrats hold		Swing		

Bradley
Party	Candidate	Votes	%	±%
Labour	Mohammed Iqbal	951	46.0	+5.2
Liberal Democrats	Saba Iftikhar	879	42.5	−9.5
Conservative	Victoria Landriau	239	11.6	+4.4
Majority		72	3.5	
Turnout		2,069	48.0	−8.7
Labour hold		Swing		

Brierfield
Party	Candidate	Votes	%	±%
Liberal Democrats	Naseem Shabnam	623	40.1	−9.8
Labour	Robert Allen	467	30.1	+6.6
Conservative	Peter Jackson	464	29.9	+3.3
Majority		156	10.0	−13.2
Turnout		1,554	42.3	−14.1
Liberal Democrats gain from Labour		Swing		

Cloverhill
Party	Candidate	Votes	%	±%
Liberal Democrats	Roy Edwards	726	44.2	−13.5
BNP	Helen Mulligan	405	24.6	+6.8
Labour	Colin Waite	358	21.8	+4.9
Conservative	Michael Landriau	155	9.4	+1.8
Majority		321	19.5	−20.4
Turnout		1,644	43.3	−8.4
Liberal Democrats gain from Labour		Swing		

Coates
Party	Candidate	Votes	%	±%
Liberal Democrats	Margaret Bell	1,002	64.6	+10.5
Conservative	Sandra Sargeant	336	21.7	+8.9
Labour	Lakhbir Randhawa	213	13.7	+2.9
Majority		666	42.9	+11.0
Turnout		1,551	39.1	−9.8
Liberal Democrats hold		Swing		

Craven
Party	Candidate	Votes	%	±%
Liberal Democrats	David Whipp	923	50.3	+6.2
BNP	John Stonnell	459	25.0	+3.1
Conservative	Valerie Langtree	301	16.4	+2.2
Labour	Sheila Wicks	151	8.2	−3.2
Majority		464	25.3	+3.1
Turnout		1,834	44.1	−5.8
Liberal Democrats hold		Swing		

Earby
Party	Candidate	Votes	%	±%
Conservative	Christopher Tennant	1,100	59.2	+15.1
Liberal Democrats	Doris Haigh	487	26.2	+1.9
Labour	Peter Wilkinson	271	14.6	+2.1
Majority		613	33.0	+13.2
Turnout		1,858	42.2	−9.8
Conservative hold		Swing		

Horsfield
Party	Candidate	Votes	%	±%
Liberal Democrats	Sharon Davies	681	43.2	+7.9
BNP	Geoffrey Whitehead	454	28.8	+9.3
Labour	Frank Allanson	251	15.9	−0.3
Conservative	Geoffrey Riley	191	12.1	+2.1
Majority		227	14.4	−1.4
Turnout		1,577	39.9	−8.3
Liberal Democrats hold		Swing		

Marsden
Party	Candidate	Votes	%	±%
BNP	Brian Parker	417	38.3	+38.3
Labour	Dorothy Ormrod	337	31.0	−13.8
Conservative	Timothy Eyre	176	16.2	−17.4
Liberal Democrats	David Dean	158	14.5	+14.5
Majority		80	7.4	
Turnout		1,088	42.7	−2.8
BNP gain from Labour		Swing		

Reedley (2)
Party	Candidate	Votes	%	±%
Conservative	Pauline McCormick	1,120		
Conservative	Joan Clegg	1,027		
Liberal Democrats	Audrey Westwell	554		
Liberal Democrats	Salma Naeem	375		
Labour	Anthony Martin	322		
Turnout		3,398	46.1	−8.7
Conservative hold		Swing		
Conservative hold		Swing		

Southfield
Party	Candidate	Votes	%	±%
Labour	Sheena Dunn	527	42.9	+12.8
Liberal Democrats	Malcolm Weinberg	491	40.0	−13.8
Conservative	Joyce Myers	210	17.1	+1.0
Majority		36	2.9	
Turnout		1,228	22.0	−23.5
Labour hold		Swing		

Vivary Bridge
Party	Candidate	Votes	%	±%
Liberal Democrats	David Clegg	690		
Liberal Democrats	Howard Thomas	599		
BNP	Robert Cottage	403		
BNP	Trevor Dawson	352		
Labour	David Foat	248		
Labour	Dianne Tweedie	230		
Conservative	Smith Benson	206		
Conservative	Harold Ryder	157		
Turnout		2,885	38.3	−4.9
Liberal Democrats hold		Swing		
Liberal Democrats hold		Swing		

Walverden
Party	Candidate	Votes	%	±%
Labour	George Adam	673	50.9	+23.7
Liberal Democrats	Abdul Malik	492	37.2	−14.1
Conservative	Ann Jackson	156	11.8	−9.7
Majority		181	13.7	
Turnout		1,321	50.7	−9.8
Labour hold		Swing		

Waterside
Party	Candidate	Votes	%	±%
Liberal Democrats	Philip Boyle	677	58.5	+2.9
Labour	Ian Tweedie	306	26.4	−0.5
Conservative	Maureen Regan	174	15.0	−2.5
Majority		371	32.1	+3.4
Turnout		1,157	31.1	−9.4
Liberal Democrats hold		Swing		

Whitefield
Party	Candidate	Votes	%	±%
Labour	Asjad Mahmood	943	51.7	+13.0
Liberal Democrats	Mahboob Ahmed	797	43.7	−11.8
Conservative	Michelle Ainsworth	83	4.6	−1.1
Majority		146	8.0	
Turnout		1,823	71.7	−6.5
Labour gain from Liberal Democrats		Swing		
