= Old Laund Booth (ward) =

Electoral ward in Lancashire, England

- Shown within Pendle
- Area: 4.00 km^{2} (1.54 sq mi)
- Population: 1,459 (2011)
  - Density: 365/km^{2} (950/sq mi)
- District: Pendle
- Ceremonial county: Lancashire
- Region: North West
- Country: England
- Sovereign state: United Kingdom
- UK Parliament: Pendle
- Councillors: John David (Liberal Democrats)

Old Laund Booth is one of the 20 electoral wards that form the Parliamentary constituency of Pendle, Lancashire, England. Old Laund Booth is also a civil parish. The ward represents the villages of Fence and Wheatley Lane, as well as part of the Lomeshaye Industrial Estate on the outskirts of nearby Nelson, and returns one councillor to sit on Pendle Borough Council. As of the May 2011 Council election, Old Laund Booth had an electorate of 1,235.

== Demographics ==
The proportion of older people in the population of Old Laund Booth is considerably higher than the local and national averages; its population has a mean age of 43.6 years, five years older than the England and Wales average. The ward also has a smaller ethnic minority population than many areas of Pendle.

== Election results ==
Year elected	Councillor	Majority	%
2011	John David (Liberal Democrat)	10	0.01
