= 2000 Pendle Borough Council election =

2000 UK local government election

The 2000 Pendle Borough Council election took place on 4 May 2000 to elect members of Pendle Borough Council in Lancashire, England. One third of the council was up for election and the council stayed under no overall control.

After the election, the composition of the council was:

- Labour 24
- Liberal Democrat 18
- Conservative 9

== Background ==
Before the election, the Liberal Democrats held 23 seats, compared to 19 for Labour and 8 Conservatives, while one seat was vacant. Seventeen seats were being contested, with two seats being up for election in Waterside ward after Labour councillor Ann Doult resigned from the council due to ill health. The Liberal Democrats only contested 13 of the 17 seats, saying "we're concentrating our resources where we think it's best".

== Election result ==
The results saw no party win a majority on the council, but the Labour party gained 4 seats.

Pendle local election result 2000
Party	Seats	Gains	Losses	Net gain/loss	Seats %	Votes %	Votes	+/−
Labour	11	4	0	+4	61.1	36.4	8,490	-4.3%
Conservative	4	2	1	+1	22.2	30.2	7,052	+9.2%
Liberal Democrats	3	0	5	-5	16.7	32.5	7,587	-5.7%
Independent	0	0	0	0	0	0.9	203	+0.9%
An Independent Green	0	0	0	0	0	0.1	24	0.0%

== Ward results ==
Barrowford
Party	Candidate	Votes	%	±%
Conservative	Anthony Beckett	813	45.4	+6.8
Liberal Democrats	Michael Simpson	691	38.6	+5.5
Labour	Robert Oliver	286	16.0	−12.3
Majority		122	6.8	+1.2
Turnout		1,790	37.6	+5.2
Conservative gain from Liberal Democrats		Swing		

Boulsworth
Party	Candidate	Votes	%	±%
Liberal Democrats	Josephine Belbin	757	56.2	+1.6
Conservative	Harold Ryder	304	22.6	−1.5
Labour	Robert Parsons	287	21.3	−0.1
Majority		45.3	33.6	+3.1
Turnout		1,348	31.9	+3.8
Liberal Democrats hold		Swing		

Bradley
Party	Candidate	Votes	%	±%
Labour	Christine Stables	770	47.0	−4.1
Liberal Democrats	Mohammed Munir	749	45.7	+1.4
Conservative	Michael Landriau	120	7.3	+2.7
Majority		21	1.3	−5.5
Turnout		1,639	47.2	−3.9
Labour hold		Swing		

Brierfield
Party	Candidate	Votes	%	±%
Labour	Bryan Akrigg	525	50.4	+13.3
Conservative	Frank Chadwick	429	41.2	+16.5
Liberal Democrats	Doris Stanworth	88	8.4	−29.8
Majority		96	9.2	
Turnout		1,042	33.0	−13.7
Labour hold		Swing		

Clover Hill
Party	Candidate	Votes	%	±%
Labour	Neil Akrigg	519	58.4	−10.6
Conservative	Ann Jackson	285	32.1	+9.5
Liberal Democrats	David French	85	9.6	+1.2
Majority		234	26.3	−20.1
Turnout		889	26.0	−2.6
Labour hold		Swing		

Coates
Party	Candidate	Votes	%	±%
Liberal Democrats	Jacqueline Taylforth	932	65.4	+11.6
Labour	John Edwards	316	22.2	−12.5
Conservative	Morris Horsfield	176	12.4	+0.9
Majority		616	43.3	+25.1
Turnout		1,424	36.7	+4.2
Liberal Democrats hold		Swing		

Craven
Party	Candidate	Votes	%	±%
Liberal Democrats	David Whipp	935	64.0	+24.9
Labour	Jennifer Purcell	349	23.9	−21.9
Conservative	Edward Myers	177	12.1	−2.9
Majority		586	40.1	
Turnout		1,461	36.7	+6.8
Liberal Democrats hold		Swing		

Earby
Party	Candidate	Votes	%	±%
Conservative	Christopher Tennant	930	46.9	+4.2
Liberal Democrats	Timothy Haigh	884	44.5	+3.0
Labour	David Foat	171	8.6	−7.3
Majority		46	2.3	+1.1
Turnout		1,985	45.8	+3.5
Conservative gain from Liberal Democrats		Swing		

Horsfield
Party	Candidate	Votes	%	±%
Labour	Colin Nightingale	484	49.1	+6.2
Liberal Democrats	Ian Wensley	284	28.8	−14.2
Conservative	Geoffrey Riley	218	22.1	+8.0
Majority		200	20.3	
Turnout		986	28.8	−2.1
Labour gain from Liberal Democrats		Swing		

Marsden
Party	Candidate	Votes	%	±%
Labour	Dorothy Ormrod	620	63.7	+1.8
Conservative	Jonathan Eyre	354	36.3	+8.2
Majority		266	27.3	−6.5
Turnout		974	27.6	−0.2
Labour hold		Swing		

Pendleside
Party	Candidate	Votes	%	±%
Conservative	Shelagh Derwent	541	88.4	
Labour	Anthony Martin	71	11.6	
Majority		470	76.8	
Turnout		612	50.5	
Conservative hold		Swing		

Reedley
Party	Candidate	Votes	%	±%
Conservative	Pauline McCormick	1,336	79.3	+28.8
Labour	Mohammad Tariq	348	20.7	+6.6
Majority		988	58.7	+43.6
Turnout		1,684	46.1	+10.3
Conservative hold		Swing		

Southfield
Party	Candidate	Votes	%	±%
Labour	Mohammad Latif	524	54.8	−1.6
Conservative	Peter Wildman	433	45.2	+24.3
Majority		91	9.5	−24.2
Turnout		957	29.7	−2.5
Labour hold		Swing		

Vivary Bridge
Party	Candidate	Votes	%	±%
Labour	David Whalley	591	43.4	−6.7
Liberal Democrats	Dorothy Lord	362	26.6	−12.0
Independent	Peter Nowland	203	14.9	+14.9
Conservative	James Ilott	183	13.4	+4.2
An Independent Green	Peter Hartley	24	1.8	−0.2
Majority		229	16.8	+5.3
Turnout		1,363	32.4	−1.9
Labour gain from Liberal Democrats		Swing		

Walverden
Party	Candidate	Votes	%	±%
Labour	George Adam	572	40.2	−11.1
Liberal Democrats	Ajaz Ditta	505	35.5	−3.2
Conservative	Roger Abbiss	347	24.4	+14.4
Majority		67	4.7	−7.8
Turnout		1,424	48.1	+1.4
Labour gain from Conservative		Swing		

Waterside (2)
Party	Candidate	Votes	%	±%
Labour	Leonard Ormrod	596		
Labour	Ian Tweedie	517		
Liberal Democrats	Linda Whittle	225		
Liberal Democrats	John Beck	217		
Conservative	Adrian Mitchell	146		
Conservative	Alexandra Thompson	143		
Turnout		1,844	31.2	−7.2
Labour hold		Swing		
Labour hold		Swing		

Whitefield
Party	Candidate	Votes	%	±%
Labour	Rashid Qadri	944	48.8	−1.2
Liberal Democrats	Liaquat Ali	873	45.1	+0.5
Conservative	Robert Holden	117	6.0	+0.7
Majority		71	3.7	−1.7
Turnout		1,934	62.1	−3.9
Labour gain from Liberal Democrats		Swing		

== By-elections between 2000 and 2002 ==
A by-election in Horsfield ward took place on 1 March 2001 after Labour councillor Colin Nightingale resigned his seat on the council due to pressure of work. The Liberal Democrats gained the seat from Labour by 429 votes, with the former mayoress of Pendle, Dorothy Lord, regaining a seat on the council after she had lost her seat in Vivary Bridge at the 2000 election.

Horsfield By-Election 1 March 2001
Party	Candidate	Votes	%	±%
Liberal Democrats	Dorothy Lord	634	69.4	+40.6
Labour	David Foat	205	22.5	−26.6
Conservative	Alexandra Thompson	74	8.1	−14.0
Majority		429	46.9	
Turnout		913	27.0	
Liberal Democrats gain from Labour		Swing		
