= Pharmacology of ethanol =

Pharmacodynamics and pharmacokinetics of ethanol

Ethanol

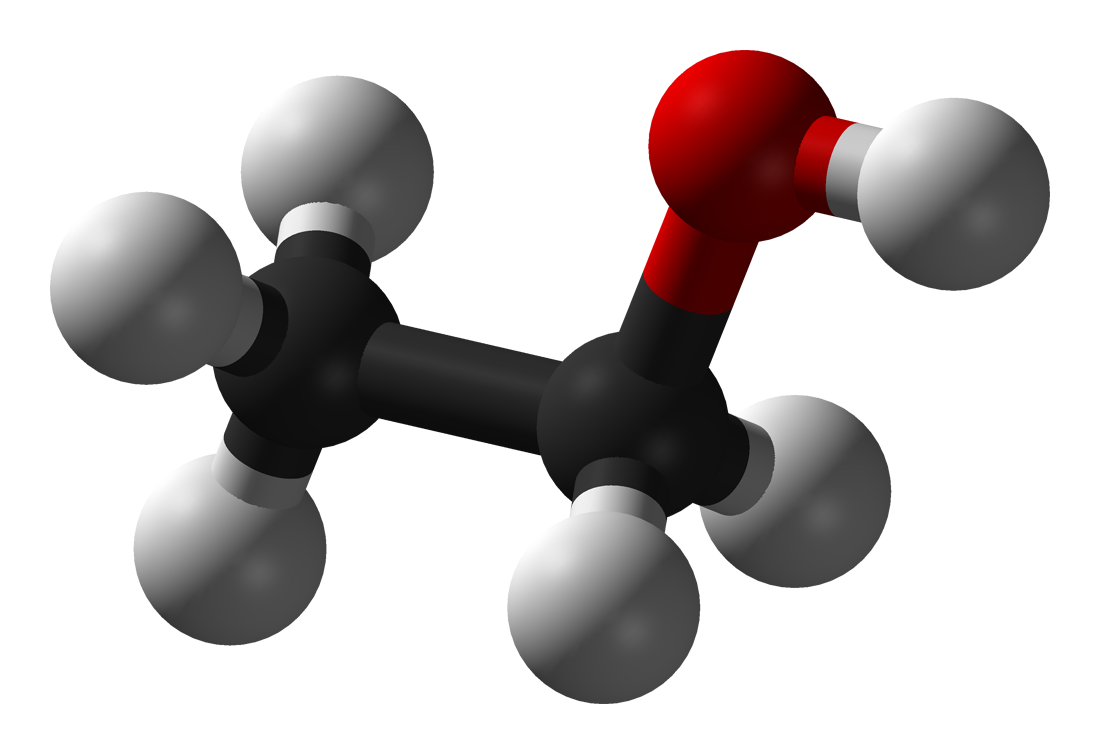

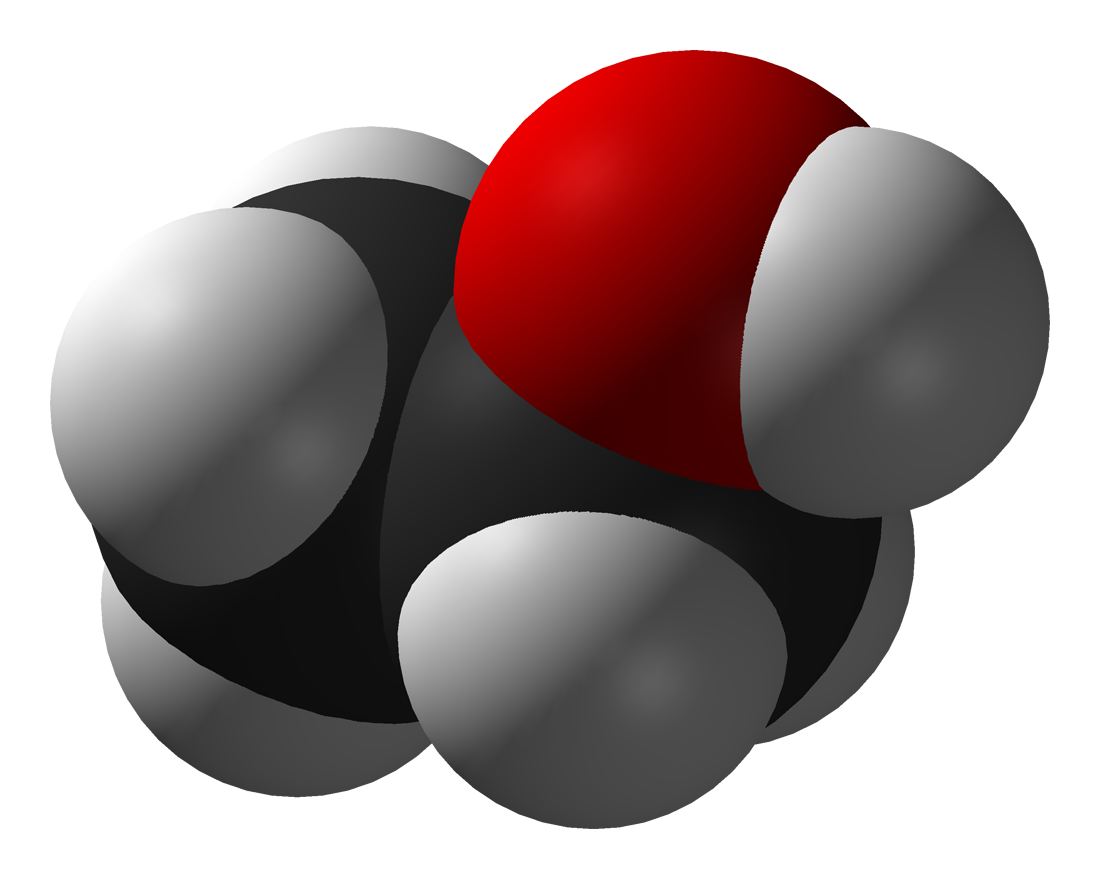

Clinical data
- Routes of administration: Common: By mouth Uncommon: Inhalation, ophthalmic, insufflation, rectal, injection
- Drug class: Depressant; anxiolytic; analgesic; euphoriant; sedative; emetic; diuretic; general anesthetic
- ATC code: V03AZ01 (WHO)

Pharmacokinetic data
- Bioavailability: 80%+
- Protein binding: Weakly or not at all
- Metabolism: Liver (90%): • Alcohol dehydrogenase • MEOS (CYP2E1)
- Metabolites: Acetaldehyde; Acetic acid; Acetyl-CoA; Carbon dioxide; Ethyl glucuronide; Ethyl sulfate; Water
- Onset of action: Peak concentrations: • Range: 30–90 minutes • Mean: 45–60 minutes • Fasting: 30 minutes
- Elimination half-life: Constant-rate elimination at typical concentrations: • Range: 10–34 mg/dL/hour • Mean (men): 15 mg/dL/hour • Mean (women): 18 mg/dL/hr; At very high concentrations (t_{1/2}): 4.0–4.5 hours
- Duration of action: 6–16 hours (amount of time that levels are detectable)
- Excretion: • Major: metabolism (into carbon dioxide and water) • Minor: urine, breath, sweat (5–10%)

Identifiers
- CAS Number: 64-17-5
- PubChem CID: 702
- IUPHAR/BPS: 2299
- DrugBank: DB00898
- ChemSpider: 682
- UNII: 3K9958V90M
- KEGG: D00068
- ChEBI: CHEBI:16236
- ChEMBL: ChEMBL545
- PDB ligand: EOH (PDBe, RCSB PDB)

Chemical and physical data
- Formula: C_{2}H_{6}O
- Molar mass: 46.069 g·mol^{−1}
- 3D model (JSmol): Interactive image
- Density: 0.7893 g/cm^{3} (at 20 °C)
- Melting point: −114.14 ± 0.03 °C (−173.45 ± 0.05 °F)
- Boiling point: 78.24 ± 0.09 °C (172.83 ± 0.16 °F)
- Solubility in water: Miscible mg/mL (20 °C)
- SMILES: CCO
- InChI: InChI=1S/C2H6O/c1-2-3/h3H,2H2,1H3; Key:LFQSCWFLJHTTHZ-UHFFFAOYSA-N

The pharmacology of ethanol involves both pharmacodynamics (how it affects the body) and pharmacokinetics (how the body processes it). In the body, ethanol primarily affects the central nervous system, acting as a depressant and causing sedation, relaxation, and decreased anxiety. The complete list of mechanisms remains an area of research, but ethanol has been shown to affect ligand-gated ion channels, particularly the GABA_{A} receptor.

After oral ingestion, ethanol is absorbed via the stomach and intestines into the bloodstream. Ethanol is highly water-soluble and diffuses passively throughout the entire body, including the brain. Soon after ingestion, it begins to be metabolized, 90% or more by the liver. One standard drink is sufficient to almost completely saturate the liver's capacity to metabolize alcohol. The main metabolite is acetaldehyde, a toxic carcinogen. Acetaldehyde is then further metabolized into ionic acetate by the enzyme aldehyde dehydrogenase (ALDH). Acetate is not carcinogenic and has low toxicity, but has been implicated in causing hangovers. Acetate is further broken down into carbon dioxide and water and eventually eliminated from the body through urine and breath. 5 to 10% of ethanol is excreted unchanged in the breath, urine, and sweat.

== History ==
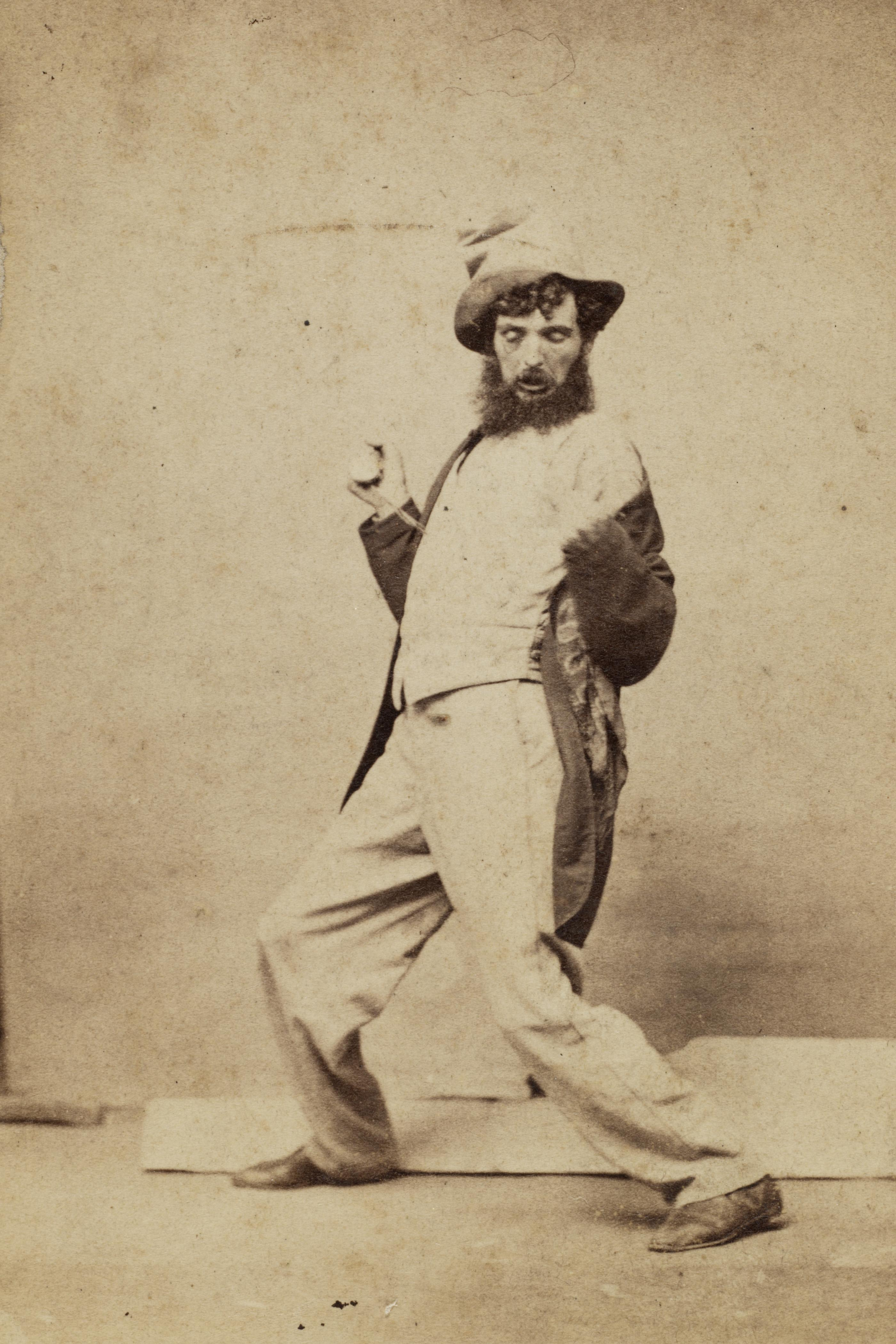
Stage Three of the Five stages of inebriation, c. 1863–1868, by Charles Percy Pickering

Beginning with the Gin Craze, excessive drinking and drunkenness developed into a major problem for public health. In 1874, Francis E. Anstie's experiments showed that the amounts of alcohol eliminated unchanged in breath, urine, sweat, and feces were negligible compared to the amount ingested, suggesting it was oxidized within the body. In 1902, Atwater and Benedict estimated that alcohol yielded 7.1 kcal of energy per gram consumed and 98% was metabolized. In 1922, Widmark published his method for analyzing the alcohol content of fingertip samples of blood. Through the 1930s, Widmark conducted numerous studies and formulated the basic principles of ethanol pharmacokinetics for forensic purposes, including the eponymous Widmark equation. In 1980, Watson et al. proposed updated equations based on total body water instead of body weight. The TBW equations have been found to be significantly more accurate due to rising levels of obesity worldwide.

== Pharmacodynamics ==
The principal mechanism of action for ethanol has proven elusive and remains not fully understood. Identifying molecular targets for ethanol is unusually difficult, in large part due to its unique biochemical properties. Specifically, ethanol is a very low molecular weight compound and is of exceptionally low potency in its actions, causing effects only at very high (millimolar mM) concentrations. For these reasons, it is not possible to employ traditional biochemical techniques to directly assess the binding of ethanol to receptors or ion channels. Instead, researchers have had to rely on functional studies to elucidate the actions of ethanol. Even at present, no binding sites have been unambiguously identified and established for ethanol. Studies have published strong evidence for certain functions of ethanol in specific systems, but other laboratories have found that these findings do not replicate with different neuronal types and heterologously expressed receptors. Thus, there remains lingering doubt about the mechanisms of ethanol listed here, even for the GABA_{A} receptor, the most-studied mechanism.

In the past, alcohol was believed to be a non-specific pharmacological agent affecting many neurotransmitter systems in the brain, but progress has been made over the last few decades. It appears that it affects ion channels, in particular ligand-gated ion channels, to mediate its effects in the CNS. In some systems, these effects are facilitatory, and in others inhibitory. Moreover, although it has been established that ethanol modulates ion channels to mediate its effects, ion channels are complex proteins, and their interactions and functions are complicated by diverse subunit compositions and regulation by conserved cellular signals (e.g. signaling lipids).

Alcohol is also converted into phosphatidylethanol (PEth, an unnatural lipid metabolite) by phospholipase D2. This metabolite competes with PIP_{2} agonist sites on lipid-gated ion channels. The result of these direct effects is a wave of further indirect effects involving a variety of other neurotransmitter and neuropeptide systems. This presents a novel indirect mechanism and suggests that a metabolite, not the ethanol itself, could cause the behavioural or symptomatic effects of alcohol intoxication. Many of the primary targets of ethanol are known to bind PIP_{2} including GABA_{A} receptors, but the role of PEth needs to be investigated further.

=== List of known actions in the central nervous system ===
Ethanol has been reported to possess the following actions in functional assays at varying concentrations:

- GABA_{A} receptor: positive allosteric modulator (primarily of δ subunit-containing receptors)
- NMDA receptor: negative allosteric modulator
- AMPA receptor: negative allosteric modulator
- Kainate receptor: negative allosteric modulator
- Glycine receptor: positive allosteric modulator
- Serotonin 5-HT_{3} receptor: positive allosteric modulator
- Opioid receptor: endogenous positive allosteric modulator
- Muscarinic acetylcholine receptor: positive allosteric modulator.
- Nicotinic acetylcholine receptor: positive allosteric modulator
- Glycine reuptake inhibitor
- Adenosine reuptake inhibitor
- L-type calcium channel: channel blocker
- GIRK: channel opener
- Voltage-gated calcium channel
- Dihydropyridine-sensitive L-type Ca2+ channels
- BK channel modulation
- G-protein-activated inwardly rectifying K+ channels
- Brain medulla: Decreased levels of nitric oxide
- Mesolimbic pathway: Increased levels of dopamine and endogenous opioids, secondary to other actions

Many of these actions have been found to occur only at very high concentrations that may not be pharmacologically significant at recreational doses of ethanol, and it is unclear how or to what extent each of the individual actions is involved in the effects of ethanol. Some of the actions of ethanol on ligand-gated ion channels, specifically the nicotinic acetylcholine receptors and the glycine receptor, are dose-dependent, with potentiation or inhibition occurring dependent on ethanol concentration. This seems to be because the effects of ethanol on these channels are a summation of positive and negative allosteric modulatory actions.

=== GABA_{A} receptors ===
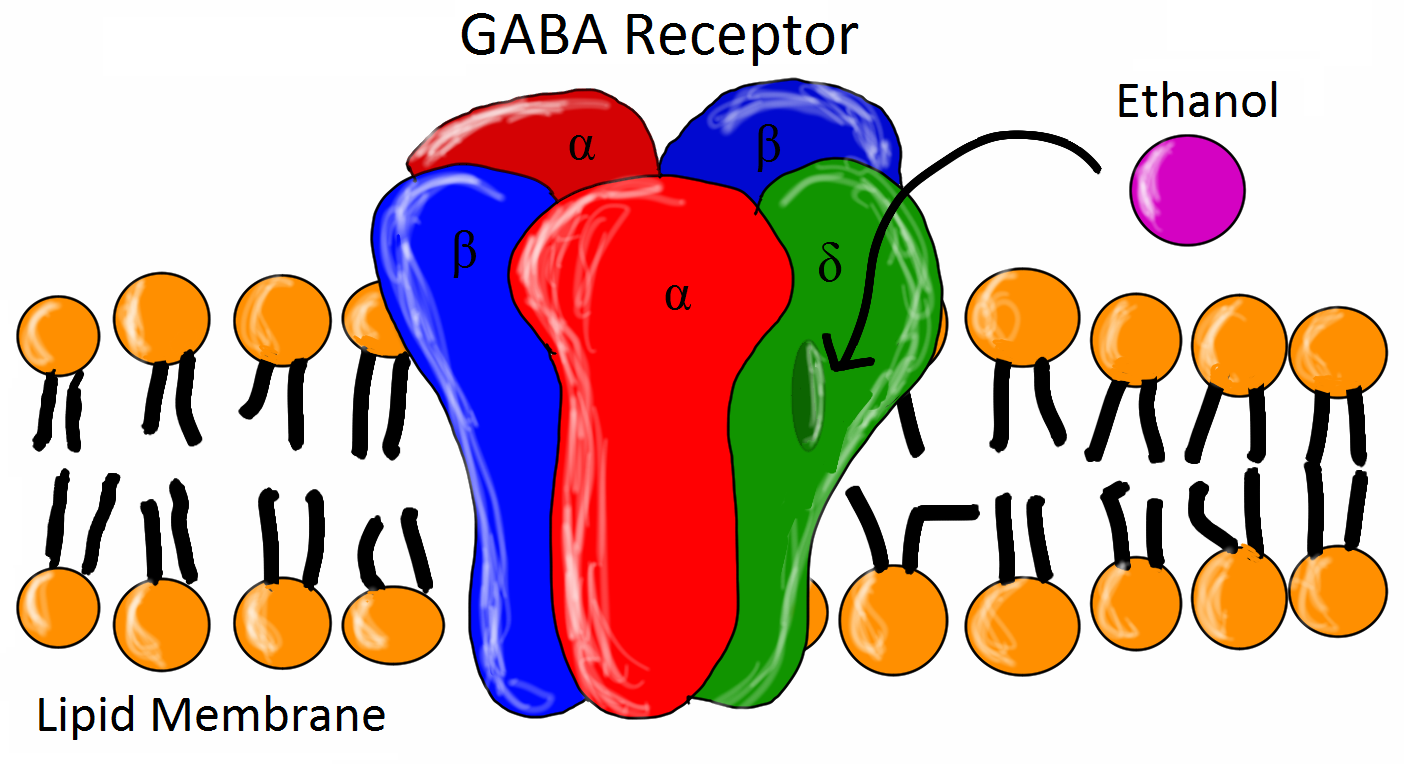
Ethanol binding to GABA_{A} receptor

Ethanol has been found to enhance GABA_{A} receptor-mediated currents in functional assays. Ethanol has long shown a similarity in its effects to positive allosteric modulators of the GABA_{A} receptor like benzodiazepines, barbiturates, and various general anesthetics. Some of these effects include anxiolytic, anticonvulsant, sedative, and hypnotic effects, cognitive impairment, and motor incoordination. In accordance, it was theorized and widely believed that the primary mechanism of action of ethanol is GABA_{A} receptor positive allosteric modulation. However, other ion channels are involved in its effects as well. Although ethanol exhibits positive allosteric binding properties to GABA_{A} receptors, its effects are limited to pentamers containing the δ-subunit rather than the γ-subunit. Ethanol potentiates extrasynaptic δ subunit-containing GABA_{A} receptors at behaviorally relevant (as low as 3 mM) concentrations, but γ subunit receptors are enhanced only at far higher concentrations (> 100 mM) that are in excess of recreational concentrations (up to 50 mM).

GABA_{A} receptors containing the δ-subunit have been shown to be located exterior to the synapse and are involved with tonic inhibition rather than its γ-subunit counterpart, which is involved in phasic inhibition. The δ-subunit has been shown to be able to form the allosteric binding site which makes GABA_{A} receptors containing the δ-subunit more sensitive to ethanol concentrations, even to moderate social ethanol consumption levels (30mM). While it has been shown by Santhakumar et al. that GABA_{A} receptors containing the δ-subunit are sensitive to ethanol modulation, depending on subunit combinations receptors could be more or less sensitive to ethanol. It has been shown that GABA_{A} receptors that contain both δ and β3-subunits display increased sensitivity to ethanol. One such receptor that exhibits ethanol insensitivity is α3-β6-δ GABA_{A}. It has also been shown that subunit combination is not the only thing that contributes to ethanol sensitivity. Location of GABA_{A} receptors within the synapse may also contribute to ethanol sensitivity.

Ro15-4513, a close analogue of the benzodiazepine antagonist flumazenil (Ro15-1788), has been found to bind to the same site as ethanol and to competitively displace it in a saturable manner. In addition, Ro15-4513 blocked the enhancement of δ subunit-containing GABA_{A} receptor currents by ethanol in vitro. In accordance, the drug has been found to reverse many of the behavioral effects of low-to-moderate doses of ethanol in rodents, including its effects on anxiety, memory, motor behavior, and self-administration. Taken together, these findings suggest a binding site for ethanol on subpopulations of the GABA_{A} receptor with specific subunit compositions via which it interacts with and potentiates the receptor.

=== Calcium channel blocking ===
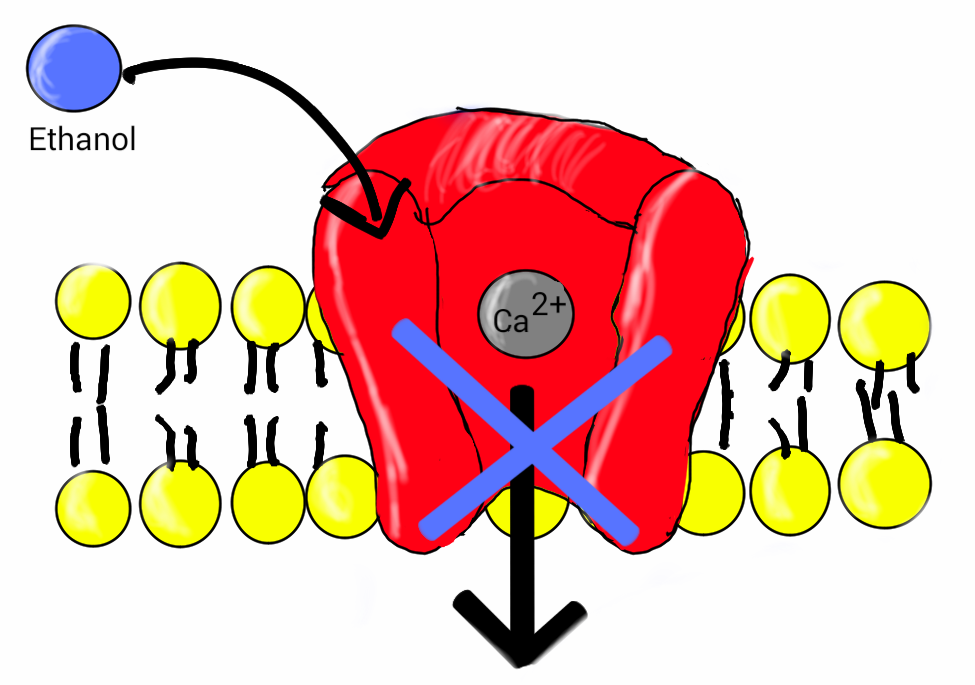
Ethanol blocks voltage-gated calcium channel

Research indicates ethanol is involved in the inhibition of L-type calcium channels. One study showed the nature of ethanol binding to L-type calcium channels is according to first-order kinetics with a Hill coefficient around 1. This indicates ethanol binds independently to the channel, expressing noncooperative binding. Early studies showed a link between calcium and the release of vasopressin by the secondary messenger system. Vasopressin levels are reduced after the ingestion of alcohol. The lower levels of vasopressin from the consumption of alcohol have been linked to ethanol acting as an antagonist to voltage-gated calcium channels (VGCCs). Studies conducted by Treistman et al. in the aplysia confirm inhibition of VGCC by ethanol. Voltage clamp recordings have been done on the aplysia neuron. VGCCs were isolated and calcium current was recorded using patch clamp technique having ethanol as a treatment. Recordings were replicated at varying concentrations (0, 10, 25, 50, and 100 mM) at a voltage clamp of +30 mV. Results showed calcium current decreased as concentration of ethanol increased. Similar results have shown to be true in single-channel recordings from isolated nerve terminal of rats that ethanol does in fact block VGCCs.

Studies done by Katsura et al. in 2006 on mouse cerebral cortical neurons, show the effects of prolonged ethanol exposure. Neurons were exposed to sustained ethanol concentrations of 50 mM for 3 days in vitro. Western blot and protein analysis were conducted to determine the relative amounts of VGCC subunit expression. α1C, α1D, and α2/δ1 subunits showed an increase of expression after sustained ethanol exposure. However, the β4 subunit showed a decrease. Furthermore, α1A, α1B, and α1F subunits did not alter in their relative expression. Thus, sustained ethanol exposure may participate in the development of ethanol dependence in neurons.

Other experiments done by Malysz et al. have looked into ethanol effects on voltage-gated calcium channels on detrusor smooth muscle cells in guinea pigs. Perforated patch clamp technique was used having intracellular fluid inside the pipette and extracellular fluid in the bath with added 0.3% vol/vol (about 50-mM) ethanol. Ethanol decreased the Ca^{2+} current in DSM cells and induced muscle relaxation. Ethanol inhibits VGCCs and is involved in alcohol-induced relaxation of the urinary bladder.

=== Rewarding and reinforcing actions ===
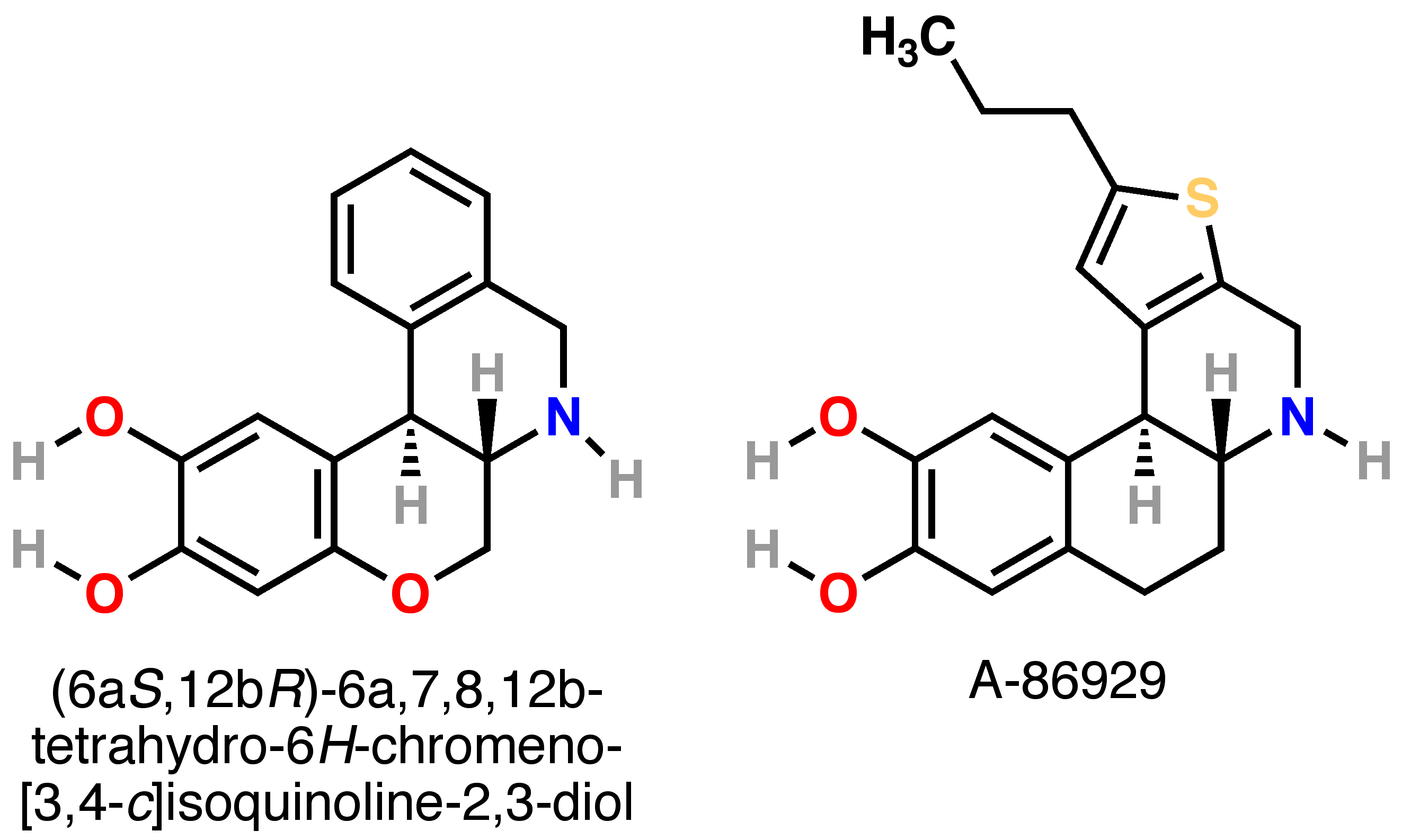
Chemical structures of selective dopamine receptor D_{1} receptor agonists

The reinforcing effects of alcohol consumption are mediated by acetaldehyde generated by catalase and other oxidizing enzymes such as cytochrome P-4502E1 in the brain. Although acetaldehyde has been associated with some of the adverse and toxic effects of ethanol, it appears to play a central role in the activation of the mesolimbic dopamine system.

Ethanol's rewarding and reinforcing (i.e., addictive) properties are mediated through its effects on dopamine neurons in the mesolimbic reward pathway, which connects the ventral tegmental area to the nucleus accumbens (NAcc). One of ethanol's primary effects is the allosteric inhibition of NMDA receptors and facilitation of GABA_{A} receptors (e.g., enhanced GABA_{A} receptor-mediated chloride flux through allosteric regulation of the receptor). At high doses, ethanol inhibits most ligand-gated ion channels and voltage-gated ion channels in neurons as well.

With acute alcohol consumption, dopamine is released in the synapses of the mesolimbic pathway, in turn heightening activation of postsynaptic D_{1} receptors. The activation of these receptors triggers postsynaptic internal signaling events through protein kinase A, which ultimately phosphorylate cAMP response element binding protein (CREB), inducing CREB-mediated changes in gene expression.

With chronic alcohol intake, consumption of ethanol similarly induces CREB phosphorylation through the D_{1} receptor pathway, but it also alters NMDA receptor function through phosphorylation mechanisms; an adaptive downregulation of the D_{1} receptor pathway and CREB function occurs as well. Chronic consumption is also associated with an effect on CREB phosphorylation and function via postsynaptic NMDA receptor signaling cascades through a MAPK/ERK pathway and CAMK-mediated pathway. These modifications to CREB function in the mesolimbic pathway induce expression (i.e., increase gene expression) of ΔFosB in the NAcc, where ΔFosB is the "master control protein" that, when overexpressed in the NAcc, is necessary and sufficient for the development and maintenance of an addictive state (i.e., its overexpression in the nucleus accumbens produces and then directly modulates compulsive alcohol consumption).

=== Relationship between concentrations and effects ===
Blood alcohol levels and effects
mg/dL	mM	% v/v	Effects
50	11	0.05%	Euphoria, talkativeness, relaxation, happiness, gladness, pleasure, joyfulness.
100	22	0.1%	Central nervous system depression, anxiety suppression, stress suppression, sedation, nausea, possible vomiting. Impaired motor, memory, cognition and sensory function.
>140	30	>0.14%	Decreased blood flow to brain, slurred speech, double or blurry vision.
300	65	0.3%	Stupefaction, confusion, numbness, dizziness, loss of consciousness.
400	87	0.4%	Ethylic intoxication, drunkenness, inebriation, alcohol poisoning or possible death.
500	109	>0.55%	Unconsciousness, coma and death.

Recreational concentrations of ethanol are typically in the range of 1 to 50 mM. Very low concentrations of 1 to 2 mM ethanol produce zero or undetectable effects except in alcohol-naive individuals. Slightly higher levels of 5 to 10 mM, which are associated with light social drinking, produce measurable effects including changes in visual acuity, decreased anxiety, and modest behavioral disinhibition. Further higher levels of 15 to 20 mM result in a degree of sedation and motor incoordination that is contraindicated with the operation of motor vehicles. In jurisdictions in the U.S., maximum blood alcohol levels for legal driving are about 17 to 22 mM. In the upper range of recreational ethanol concentrations of 20 to 50 mM, depression of the central nervous system is more marked, with effects including complete drunkenness, profound sedation, amnesia, emesis, hypnosis, and eventually unconsciousness. Levels of ethanol above 50 mM are not typically experienced by normal individuals and hence are not usually physiologically relevant; however, such levels – ranging from 50 to 100 mM – may be experienced by alcoholics with high tolerance to ethanol. Concentrations above this range, specifically in the range of 100 to 200 mM, would cause death in all people except alcoholics.

As drinking increases, people become sleepy or fall into a stupor. After a very high level of consumption, the respiratory system becomes depressed and the person will stop breathing. Comatose patients may aspirate their vomit (resulting in vomitus in the lungs, which may cause "drowning" and later pneumonia if survived). CNS depression and impaired motor coordination along with poor judgment increase the likelihood of accidental injury occurring. It is estimated that about one-third of alcohol-related deaths are due to accidents and another 14% are from intentional injury.

In addition to respiratory failure and accidents caused by its effects on the central nervous system, alcohol causes significant metabolic derangements. Hypoglycaemia occurs due to ethanol's inhibition of gluconeogenesis, especially in children, and may cause lactic acidosis, ketoacidosis, and acute kidney injury. Metabolic acidosis is compounded by respiratory failure. Patients may also present with hypothermia.

== Pharmacokinetics ==
The pharmacokinetics of ethanol are well characterized by the ADME acronym (absorption, distribution, metabolism, excretion). Besides the dose ingested, factors such as the person's total body water, speed of drinking, the drink's nutritional content, and the contents of the stomach all influence the profile of blood alcohol content (BAC) over time. Breath alcohol content (BrAC) and BAC have similar profile shapes, so most forensic pharmacokinetic calculations can be done with either. Relatively few studies directly compare BrAC and BAC within subjects and characterize the difference in pharmacokinetic parameters. Comparing arterial and venous BAC, arterial BAC is higher during the absorption phase and lower in the postabsorptive declining phase.

=== Endogenous production ===
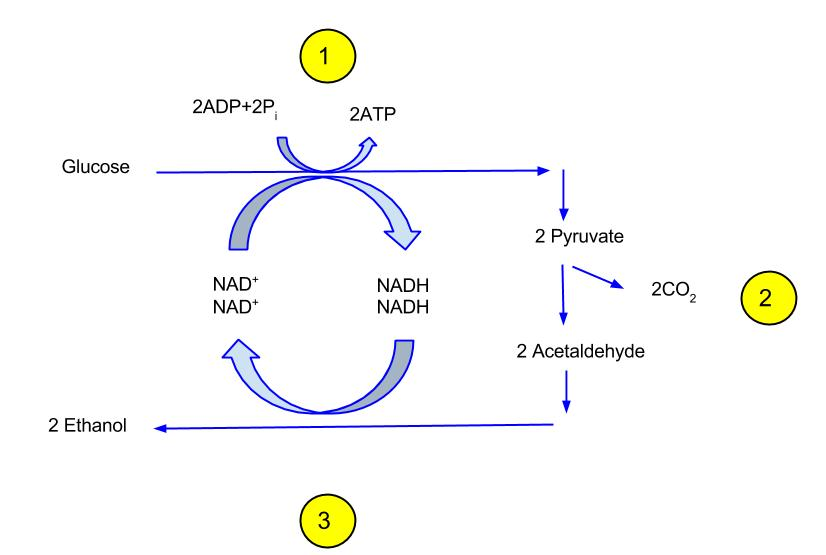
Ethanol fermentation cycle

All organisms produce alcohol in small amounts by several pathways, primarily through fatty acid synthesis, glycerolipid metabolism, and bile acid biosynthesis pathways. Fermentation is a biochemical process during which yeast and certain bacteria convert sugars to ethanol, carbon dioxide, as well as other metabolic byproducts. The average human digestive system produces approximately 3 g of ethanol per day through fermentation of its contents. Such production generally does not have any forensic significance because the ethanol is broken down before significant intoxication ensues. These trace amounts of alcohol range from 0.1 to 0.3 μg/mL in the blood of healthy humans, with some measurements as high as 1.6 μg/mL (0.002 g/L).

Auto-brewery syndrome is a condition characterized by significant fermentation of ingested carbohydrates within the body. In rare cases, intoxicating quantities of ethanol may be produced, especially after eating meals. Claims of endogenous fermentation have been attempted as a defense against drunk driving charges, some of which have been successful, but the condition is under-researched.

=== Absorption ===
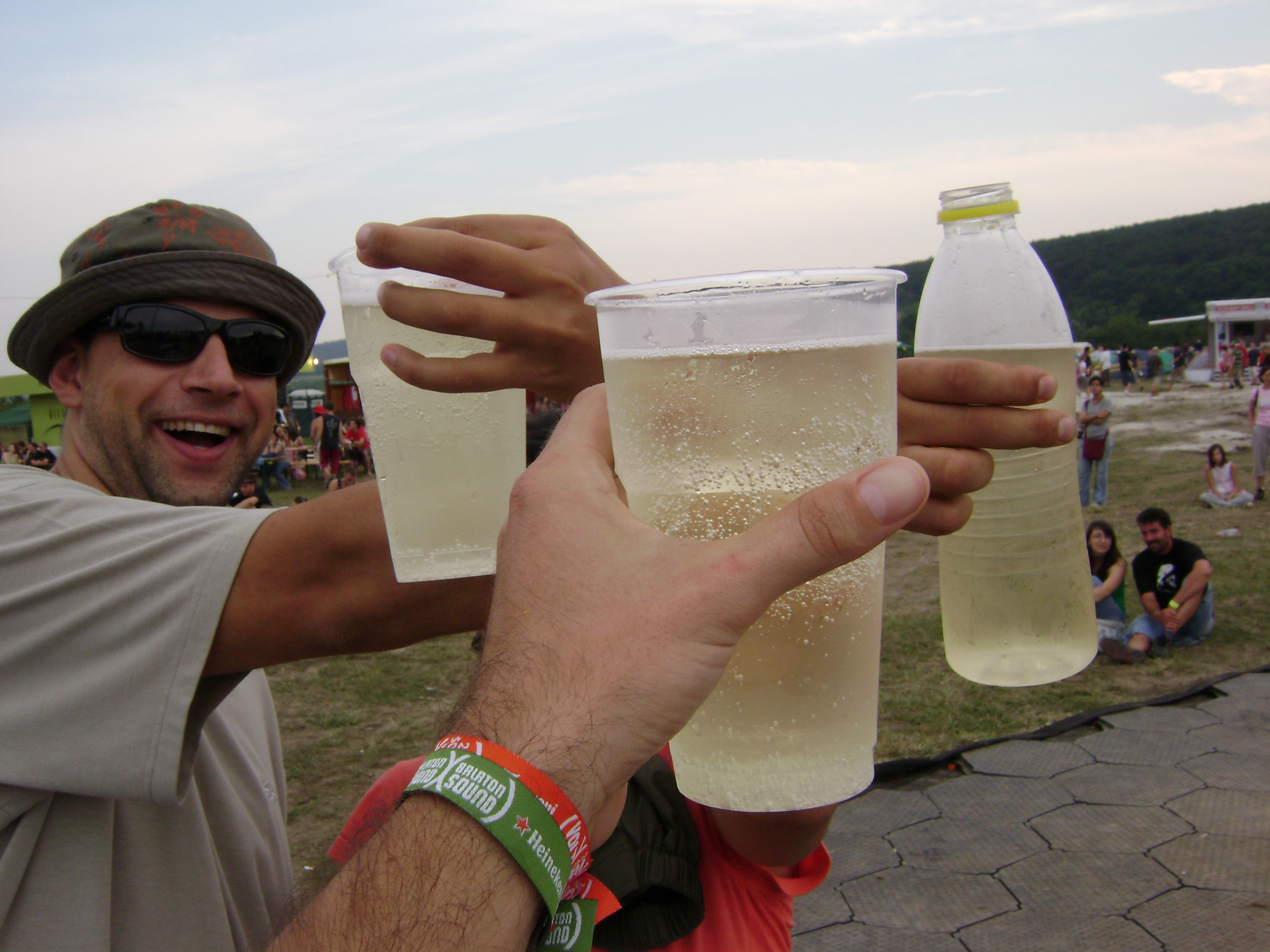
People drinking spritzers at a festival in Hungary. Carbonated alcoholic drinks seem to be absorbed faster.

Ethanol is most commonly ingested by mouth, but other routes of administration are possible, such as inhalation, enema, or by intravenous injection. With oral administration, the ethanol is absorbed into the portal venous blood through the mucosa of the gastrointestinal tract, such as in the oral cavity, stomach, duodenum, and jejunum. The oral bioavailability of ethanol is quite high, with estimates ranging from 80% at a minimum to 94–96%. The ethanol molecule is small and uncharged, and easily crosses biological membranes by passive diffusion. The absorption rate of ethanol is typically modeled as a first-order kinetic process depending on the concentration gradient and specific membrane. The rate of absorption is fastest in the duodenum and jejunum, owing to the larger absorption surface area provided by the villi and microvilli of the small intestines. Gastric emptying is therefore an important consideration when estimating the overall rate of absorption in most scenarios; the presence of a meal in the stomach delays gastric emptying, and absorption of ethanol into the blood is consequently slower. Due to irregular gastric emptying patterns, the rate of absorption of ethanol is unpredictable, varying significantly even between drinking occasions. In experiments, aqueous ethanol solutions have been given intravenously or rectally to avoid this variation. The delay in ethanol absorption caused by food is similar regardless of whether food is consumed just before, at the same time, or just after ingestion of ethanol. The type of food, whether fat, carbohydrates, or protein, also is of little importance. Not only does food slow the absorption of ethanol, but it also reduces the bioavailability of ethanol, resulting in lower circulating concentrations.

Regarding inhalation, early experiments with animals showed that it was possible to produce significant BAC levels comparable to those obtained by injection, by forcing the animal to breathe alcohol vapor. In humans, concentrations of ethanol in air above 10 mg/L caused initial coughing and smarting of the eyes and nose, which went away after adaptation. 20 mg/L was just barely tolerable. Concentrations above 30 mg/L caused continuous coughing and tears, and concentrations above 40 mg/L were described as intolerable, suffocating, and impossible to bear for even short periods. Breathing air with concentration of 15 mg/L ethanol for 3 hours resulted in BACs from 0.02 to 0.45 g/L, depending on breathing rate. It is not a particularly efficient or enjoyable method of becoming intoxicated.

Ethanol is not absorbed significantly through intact skin. The steady state flux is 0.08 μmol/cm^{2}/hr. Applying a 70% ethanol solution to a skin area of 1000 cm^{2} for 1 hr would result in approximately 0.1 g of ethanol being absorbed. The substantially increased levels of ethanol in the blood reported for some experiments are likely due to inadvertent inhalation. A study that did not prevent respiratory uptake found that applying 200 mL of hand disinfectant containing 95% w/w ethanol (150 g ethanol total) over the course of 80 minutes in a 3-minutes-on 5-minutes-off pattern resulted in the median BAC among volunteers peaking 30 minutes after the last application at 17.5 mg/L (0.00175%). This BAC roughly corresponds to drinking one gram of pure ethanol. Ethanol is rapidly absorbed through cut or damaged skin, with reports of ethanol intoxication and fatal poisoning.

The timing of peak blood concentration varies depends on the type of alcoholic drink:

- Vodka tonic: 36 ± 10 minutes after consumption
- Wine: 54 ± 14 minutes
- Beer: 62 ± 23 minutes

Also, carbonated alcoholic drinks seem to have a shorter onset compare to flat drinks in the same volume. One theory is that carbon dioxide in the bubbles somehow speeds the flow of alcohol into the intestines.

Absorption is reduced by a large meal. Stress speeds up absorption.

=== Distribution ===
After absorption, the alcohol goes through the portal vein to the liver, then through the hepatic veins to the heart, then the pulmonary arteries to the lungs, then the pulmonary veins to the heart again, and then enters systemic circulation. Once in systematic circulation, ethanol distributes throughout the body, diffusing passively and crossing all biological membranes including the blood–brain barrier. At equilibrium, ethanol is present in all body fluids and tissues in proportion to their water content. Ethanol does not bind to plasma proteins or other biomolecules. The rate of distribution depends on blood supply, specifically the cross-sectional area of the local capillary bed and the blood flow per gram of tissue. As such, ethanol rapidly affects the brain, liver, and kidneys, which have high blood flow. Other tissues with lower circulation, such as skeletal muscles and bone, require more time for ethanol to distribute into. In rats, it takes around 10–15 minutes for tissue and venous blood to reach equilibrium. Peak circulating levels of ethanol are usually reached within a range of 30 to 90 minutes of ingestion, with an average of 45 to 60 minutes. People who have fasted overnight have been found to reach peak ethanol concentrations more rapidly, at within 30 minutes of ingestion.

The volume of distribution V_{d} contributes about 15% of the uncertainty to Widmark's equation and has been the subject of much research. Widmark originally used units of mass (g/kg) for EBAC, thus he calculated the apparent mass of distribution M_{d} or mass of blood in kilograms. He fitted an equation $M_d=\rho_m W$ of the body weight W in kg, finding an average rho-factor of 0.68 for men and 0.55 for women. This ρ_{m} has units of dose per body weight (g/kg) divided by concentration (g/kg) and is therefore dimensionless. However, modern calculations use weight/volume concentrations (g/L) for EBAC, so Widmark's rho-factors must be adjusted for the density of blood, 1.055 g/mL. This $\rho_v = V_d / W$ has units of dose per body weight (g/kg) divided by concentration (g/L blood) - calculation gives values of 0.64 L/kg for men and 0.52 L/kg for women, lower than the original. Newer studies have updated these values to population-average ρ_{v} of 0.71 L/kg for men and 0.58 L/kg for women. But individual V_{d} values may vary significantly - the 95% range for ρ_{v} is 0.58-0.83 L/kg for males and 0.43-0.73 L/kg for females. A more accurate method for calculating V_{d} is to use total body water (TBW) - experiments have confirmed that alcohol distributes almost exactly in proportion to TBW within the Widmark model. TBW may be calculated using body composition analysis or estimated using anthropometric formulas based on age, height, and weight. V_{d} is then given by $TBW_\text{kg} / F_{\text{water}}$, where $F_{\text{water}}$ is the water content of blood, approximately 0.825 w/v for men and 0.838 w/v for women.

These calculations assume Widmark's zero-order model for the effects of metabolization, and assume that TBW is almost exactly the volume of distribution of ethanol. Using a more complex model that accounts for non-linear metabolism, Norberg found that V_{d} was only 84-87% of TBW. This finding was not reproduced in a newer study which found volumes of distribution similar to those in the literature.

=== Metabolism ===
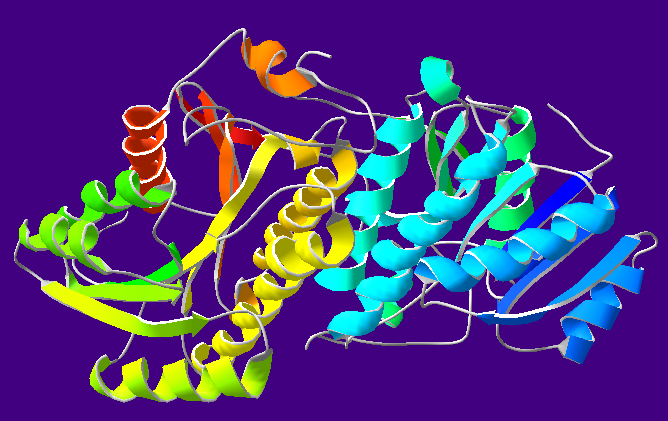
Alcohol dehydrogenase

Several metabolic pathways exist:

- One pathway involves alcohol dehydrogenase, particularly the IB (class I), beta polypeptide (ADH1B, EC 1.1.1.1) enzyme. The reaction uses NAD^{+} to convert the ethanol into acetaldehyde (a toxic carcinogen). The enzyme acetaldehyde dehydrogenase (aldehyde dehydrogenase 2 family ALDH2, EC 1.2.1.3) then converts the acetaldehyde into the non-toxic acetate ion (commonly found in acetic acid or vinegar). This ion is in turn is broken down into carbon dioxide and water. Specifically, acetate combines with coenzyme A (acetyl-CoA synthetase) to form acetyl-CoA, via the enzymes acyl-CoA synthetase short-chain family member 2 ACSS2 (EC 6.2.1.1) and acetyl-CoA synthase 2 (ACSS1). acetyl-CoA then participates in the citric acid cycle. At even low physiological concentrations, ethanol completely saturates alcohol dehydrogenase. This is because ethanol has high affinity for the enzyme and very high concentrations of ethanol occur when it is used as a recreational substance.
- The microsomal ethanol-oxidizing system (MEOS), specifically mediated by the cytochrome P450 enzyme CYP2E1, is another major route of ethanol metabolism. CYP2E1 is predominantly active at higher concentrations. Repeated or chronic use of ethanol increases the activity of CYP2E1.
- The activity of ADH and CYP2E1 alone does not appear sufficient to fully explain the increase in ethanol metabolism rate. There may be one or more additional pathways that metabolize as much as 25 to 35% of ethanol at typical concentrations.
- A small amount of ethanol undergoes conjugation to form ethyl glucuronide and ethyl sulfate.

==== Detailed ADH pathway ====
The reaction from ethanol to carbon dioxide and water proceeds in at least 11 steps in humans. C_{2}H_{6}O (ethanol) is converted to C_{2}H_{4}O (acetaldehyde), then to C_{2}H_{4}O_{2} (acetic acid), then to acetyl-CoA. Once acetyl-CoA is formed, it is free to enter directly into the citric acid cycle (TCA) and is converted to 2 CO_{2} molecules in 8 reactions. The equations:

C_{2}H_{6}O(ethanol) + NAD^{+} → C_{2}H_{4}O(acetaldehyde) + NADH + H^{+}
C_{2}H_{4}O(acetaldehyde) + NAD^{+} + H_{2}O → C_{2}H_{4}O_{2}(acetic acid) + NADH + H^{+}
C_{2}H_{4}O_{2}(acetic acid) + CoA + ATP → Acetyl-CoA + AMP + PP_{i}

The Gibbs free energy is simply calculated from the free energy of formation of the product and reactants. If catabolism of alcohol goes all the way to completion, then there is a very exothermic event yielding some 1325 kJ/mol of energy. If the reaction stops part way through the metabolic pathways, which happens because acetic acid is excreted in the urine after drinking, then not nearly as much energy can be derived from alcohol, indeed, only 215.1 kJ/mol. At the very least, the theoretical limits on energy yield are determined to be −215.1 kJ/mol to −1325.6 kJ/mol. The first with NADH is endothermic, requiring 47.2 kJ/mol of alcohol, or about 3 molecules of adenosine triphosphate (ATP) per molecule of ethanol.

==== Variation ====
Variations in genes influence alcohol metabolism and drinking behavior. Certain amino acid sequences in the enzymes used to oxidize ethanol are conserved (unchanged) going back to the last common ancestor over 3.5 bya. Evidence suggests that humans evolved the ability to metabolize dietary ethanol between 7 and 21 million years ago, in a common ancestor shared with chimpanzees and gorillas but not orangutans. Gene variation in these enzymes can lead to variation in catalytic efficiency between individuals. Some individuals have less effective metabolizing enzymes of ethanol, and can experience more marked symptoms from ethanol consumption than others. However, those having acquired alcohol tolerance have a greater quantity of these enzymes, and metabolize ethanol more rapidly. Specifically, ethanol has been observed to be cleared more quickly by regular drinkers than non-drinkers.

Falsely high BAC readings may be seen in patients with kidney or liver disease or failure. Such persons also have impaired acetaldehyde dehydrogenase, which causes acetaldehyde levels to peak higher, producing more severe hangovers and other effects such as flushing and tachycardia. Conversely, members of certain ethnicities that traditionally did not use alcoholic beverages have lower levels of alcohol dehydrogenases and thus "sober up" very slowly but reach lower aldehyde concentrations and have milder hangovers. The rate of detoxification of alcohol can also be slowed by certain drugs which interfere with the action of alcohol dehydrogenases, notably aspirin, furfural (which may be found in fusel alcohol), fumes of certain solvents, many heavy metals, and some pyrazole compounds. Also suspected of having this effect are cimetidine, ranitidine, and acetaminophen (paracetamol).

An "abnormal" liver with conditions such as hepatitis, cirrhosis, gall bladder disease, and cancer is likely to result in a slower rate of metabolism. People under 25 and women may process alcohol more slowly.

Food such as fructose can increase the rate of alcohol metabolism. The effect can vary significantly from person to person, but a 100 g dose of fructose has been shown to increase alcohol metabolism by an average of 80%. In people with proteinuria and hematuria, fructose can cause falsely high BAC readings, due to kidney-liver metabolism.

==== First-pass metabolism ====
During a typical drinking session, approximately 90% of the metabolism of ethanol occurs in the liver. Alcohol dehydrogenase and aldehyde dehydrogenase are present at their highest concentrations (in liver mitochondria). But these enzymes are widely expressed throughout the body, such as in the stomach and small intestine. Some alcohol undergoes a first pass of metabolism in these areas, before it ever enters the bloodstream.

==== In alcoholics ====
Under alcoholic conditions, the citric acid cycle is stalled by the oversupply of NADH derived from ethanol oxidation. The resulting backup of acetate shifts the reaction equilibrium for acetaldehyde dehydrogenase back towards acetaldehyde. Acetaldehyde subsequently accumulates and begins to form covalent bonds with cellular macromolecules, forming toxic adducts that, eventually, lead to death of the cell. This same excess of NADH from ethanol oxidation causes the liver to move away from fatty acid oxidation, which produces NADH, towards fatty acid synthesis, which consumes NADH. This consequent lipogenesis is believed to account largely for the pathogenesis of alcoholic fatty liver disease.

==== In human fetuses ====
In human embryos and fetuses, ethanol is not metabolized via ADH as ADH enzymes are not yet expressed to any significant quantity in human fetal liver (the induction of ADH only starts after birth, and requires years to reach adult levels). Accordingly, the fetal liver cannot metabolize ethanol or other low molecular weight xenobiotics. In fetuses, ethanol is instead metabolized at much slower rates by different enzymes from the cytochrome P-450 superfamily (CYP), in particular by CYP2E1. The low fetal rate of ethanol clearance is responsible for the important observation that the fetal compartment retains high levels of ethanol long after ethanol has been cleared from the maternal circulation by the adult ADH activity in the maternal liver. CYP2E1 expression and activity have been detected in various human fetal tissues after the onset of organogenesis (ca 50 days of gestation). Exposure to ethanol is known to promote further induction of this enzyme in fetal and adult tissues. CYP2E1 is a major contributor to the so-called Microsomal Ethanol Oxidizing System (MEOS) and its activity in fetal tissues is thought to contribute significantly to the toxicity of maternal ethanol consumption. In presence of ethanol and oxygen, CYP2E1 is known to release superoxide radicals and induce the oxidation of polyunsaturated fatty acids to toxic aldehyde products like 4-hydroxynonenal (HNE).

The concentration of alcohol in breast milk produced during lactation is closely correlated to the individual's blood alcohol content.

=== Elimination ===
Alcohol is removed from the bloodstream by a combination of metabolism, excretion, and evaporation. 90-98% of ingested ethanol is metabolized into carbon dioxide and water. Around 5 to 10% of ethanol that is ingested is excreted unchanged in urine, breath, and sweat. Transdermal alcohol that diffuses through the skin as insensible perspiration or is exuded as sweat (sensible perspiration) can be detected using wearable sensor technology such as the SCRAM ankle bracelet or the more discreet ION Wearable. Ethanol or its metabolites may be detectable in urine for up to 96 hours (3–5 days) after ingestion.

Unlike most physiologically active materials, in typical recreational use, ethanol is removed from the bloodstream at an approximately constant rate (linear decay or zero-order kinetics), rather than at a rate proportional to the current concentration (exponential decay with a characteristic elimination half-life). This is because typical doses of alcohol saturate the enzymes' capacity. In Widmark's model, the elimination rate from the blood, β, contributes 60% of the uncertainty. Similarly to ρ, its value depends on the units used for blood. β varies 58% by occasion and 42% between subjects; it is thus difficult to determine β precisely, and more practical to use a mean and a range of values. Typical elimination rates range from 10 to 34 mg/dL per hour, with Jones recommending the range 0.10 - 0.25 g/L/h for forensic purposes, for all subjects. Earlier studies found mean elimination rates of 15 mg/dL per hour for men and 18 mg/dL per hour for women, but Jones found 0.148 g/L/h and 0.156 g/L/h respectively. Although the difference between sexes is statistically significant, it is small compared to the overall uncertainty, so Jones recommends using the value 0.15 for the mean for all subjects. This mean rate is very roughly 8 grams of pure ethanol per hour (one British unit). Explanations for the gender difference are quite varied and include liver size, secondary effects of the volume of distribution, and sex-specific hormones. A 2023 study using a more complex two-compartment model with M-M elimination kinetics, with data from 60 men and 12 women, found statistically small effects of gender on maximal elimination rate and excluded them from the final model.

At concentrations below 0.15-0.20 g/L, alcohol is eliminated more slowly and the elimination rate more closely follows first-order kinetics. The overall behavior of the elimination rate is described well by Michaelis–Menten kinetics. This change in behavior was not noticed by Widmark because he could not analyze low BAC levels. The rate of elimination of ethanol is also increased at very high concentrations, such as in overdose, again more closely following first-order kinetics, with an elimination half-life of about 4 or 4.5 hours (a clearance rate of approximately 6 L/hour/70 kg). This is thought to be due to increased activity of CYP2E1.

Eating food in proximity to drinking increases elimination rate significantly, mainly due to increased metabolism.

=== Modeling ===
In fasting volunteers, blood levels of ethanol increase proportionally with the dose of ethanol administered. Peak blood alcohol concentrations may be estimated by dividing the amount of ethanol ingested by the body weight of the individual and correcting for water dilution. For time-dependent calculations, Swedish professor Erik Widmark developed a model of alcohol pharmacokinetics in the 1920s. The model corresponds to a single-compartment model with instantaneous absorption and zero-order kinetics for elimination. The model is most accurate when used to estimate BAC a few hours after drinking a single dose of alcohol in a fasted state, and can be within 20% CV of the true value. It is less accurate for BAC levels below 0.2 g/L (alcohol is not eliminated as quickly as predicted) and consumption with food (overestimating the peak BAC and time to return to zero).

== See also ==
- Subjective response to alcohol
