= Mitton (surname) =

Mitton is a surname. Notable people with the surname include:

- Bernard Mitton (1954–2017), South African tennis player
- David Mitton (1939–2008), British television producer and director
- Geraldine Mitton (1868–1955), English novelist, biographer, editor, and guide-book writer
- Grant Mitton (field hockey), Australian field hockey player
- Grant Mitton (politician) (born 1941), Canadian radio talk show host and politician
- Jack Mitton (1895–1983), English footballer
- Jimmy Mitton (1890–1949), English footballer
- Lorne Mitton, Canadian politician
- Randy Mitton (born 1950), ice hockey linesman
- Simon Mitton (born 1946), British astronomer and writer
- Trent Mitton (born 1990), Australian field hockey player
