= Reedley =

Reedley may refer to:

- Reedley, Lancashire, England, United Kingdom
- Reedley, California, United States of America
