= William Pickles (medical doctor) =

British physician (1885–1969)

- Born: 6 March 1885; Leeds, England
- Died: 2 March 1969 (aged 83)
- Education: Leeds Grammar School Leeds Medical School Worshipful Society of Apothecaries
- Occupation: General Practitioner
- Medical career
- Institutions: RCGP

William Norman Pickles CBE (6 March 1885 – 2 March 1969) was a British physician who worked as a general practitioner and was the first president of the Royal College of General Practitioners in 1953.

He showed the opportunities available to GPs for epidemiological observation in two British Medical Journal (BMJ) articles in 1930, on 'catarrhal jaundice' and in 1933, on Bornholm disease. His observations reached a wider audience in his book, Epidemiology in Country Practice (1939). This contained pioneering work on the incubation periods of common infectious diseases of the time and earned him the reputation of one of the world's leading epidemiologists.

He was in practice in Wensleydale for more than 50 years, half of which time he spent recording his observations, thus proving that the rural general practitioner had great opportunities to make observations on disease.

== Early life ==
Pickles was born in Camp Road, Leeds, on 6 March 1885 to the general practitioner, John Jagger Pickles and his Quaker wife Lucy Pickles. His grandfather was a local pharmacist. He was one of six sons, all of whom went into medicine and four of whom also became GPs.

He attended Leeds Grammar School and then Leeds Medical School (Yorkshire College) in 1902. In his third year, he proceeded with his clinical studies at the Leeds General Infirmary, qualifying as a licentiate of the Society of Apothecaries (LSA) in 1909. He served as the resident obstetric officer at the Infirmary, after which he held a series of temporary jobs and locum positions. He graduated MB BS from the University of London in 1910 and MD in 1918.

In 1917, he married Gertrude Adelaide Tunstill, daughter of Harry Tunstill, a wealthy mill owner from Burnley, Lancashire.

== Medical career ==
=== Influences ===
Pickles was influenced by the physician-epidemiologist William Budd, and the cardiologist and general practitioner James Mackenzie, who argued that it was the GP as family physician who had the true insight into disease. He later advised all young doctors and medical students to read McNair Wilson's biography of Mackenzie The Beloved Physician.

=== Early medical career ===
He held several locum positions in his early career and became an assistant to Dr Horsfall and Dr Eddison of Bedale in the North Riding of Yorkshire, doing his rounds by bicycle, assisting in operations and performing most of the midwifery. An incident involving a sick gypsy and a defective water pump led him to make correlations with an outbreak of typhoid. As John Snow had done with the Broad Street pump in 1866, Pickles ended the typhoid epidemic by having the water pump closed, which stirred his first interest in epidemiology

=== Aysgarth ===
In 1912 he visited Aysgarth for the first time, as a locum for Dr Edward Hime. Later that year he served as a ship's doctor on voyage to Calcutta and, on his return to England, resumed working for Dr Hime as a second assistant. In 1913, Dr Hime left Wensleydale and sold the practice to Pickles and Dr Dean Dunbar for £3,000. Dunbar, assumed the position of Medical Officer for Health at the workhouse and was also on the Board of Guardians of the workhouse at Bainbridge. Pickles was the second assistant to Dunbar. At the time, the practice in Aysgarth served eight villages and a population of more than 4,000.

=== First World War ===
Pickles served as surgeon-lieutenant in the Royal Naval Reserve during the First World War where he observed and wrote about sailors with poor oral hygiene that predisposed them to Vincent's disease. The Royal Naval Medical Journal published his work in 1918.

=== Epidemiology ===
In an article in the British Medical Journal in 1930 "Epidemic catarrhal jaundice: An Outbreak in Yorkshire", and in another in 1933, "Bornholm Disease: Account of a Yorkshire Outbreak", Pickles showed the opportunities available to GPs for epidemiological observation. His observations reached a wider audience in his 1939 book Epidemiology in Country Practice, in which he described an unusually severe epidemic of catarrhal jaundice in the Dale that had occurred in 1929. It was later discovered to be Hepatitis A and many school children were affected. Through his observational studies, he was able to prove that the incubation period was 26–35 days. He also traced one case to the relationship between an affected maid and a man who sneaked through the door to help her "wash up". For Pickles, it was "great fun when we could exercise Sherlock Holmes tactics and nail the culprits".

In 1933, Pickles was the first person to describe Bornholm disease in detail in Britain. Without any known cure, one response to his findings was that suffers could be “safely left to the care of the physician”. Pickles was said to remark on his view of the hazard being “that on some occasions it would come under the care of the surgeon”. The condition is now known to be caused by Coxsackie B virus.

In 1935 Pickles spoke to the Epidemiology Section of the Royal Society of Medicine on measles, the incubation period of which was thought to be between 7 and 18 days. He used an example of a farm boy who transmitted the measles to his aunt who sat in the aerially connected room below, to demonstrate an incubation period of 12 days.

His period of service in Wensleydale eventually covered more than 50 years, half of which time he spent recording his observations. Once, as he looked down upon Wensleydale from the top of a hill, he realised that he knew everyone in the village and most on a first name basis. His success lay in showing that the rural general practitioner had opportunities for making observations on disease. This was as a result of Pickles's close acquaintance with the eight villages he looked after. His wife Gertie, was deeply involved in keeping the charts up to date and in order.

== Death and legacy ==
His right leg was amputated in 1965. Pickles died from pneumonia on 2 March 1969. His wife died later the same year. His obituary noted that he was respectful to all his patients, even the "most awkward" ones.

In 1968, the education foundation of the RCGP instituted an annual William Pickles Lecture, the first of which was delivered that year by P.S. Byrne.

== Honours and awards ==
- 1942 - Milroy lecturer at the Royal College of Physicians of London - due to the war, the lecture entitled Epidemic Diseases in Village Life, in Peace and War was never given.
- 1946 – The BMA's Stewart prize, shared with Major Greenwood.
- 1948 – Epidemiologist, Professor John Gordon of Harvard, whilst visiting London in 1943, had been impressed with Pickle's book and requested the Ministry of Health to arrange to meet him in Aysgarth. Subsequently, Pickles was invited to give the Cutter lecture at Harvard in 1948, the first of international lectures.
- 1949/1950 – Honorary DSc from the University of Leeds.
- 1953 – Bisset- Hawkins medal of the Royal College of Physicians.
- 1953–56 – First President of the Royal College of General Practitioners, showing that GPs could accomplish "world class research" in the community.
- 1953 - Gave first Sir James Mackenzie Lecture.
- 1955 - Honorary fellow of the Royal College of Physicians of Edinburgh.
- 1957 - Awarded CBE.

== Selected publications ==
- "Vincent's disease", Journal of the Royal Naval Medical Service, 1919; 5: 87.
- "Epidemic catarrhal jaundice: An Outbreak in Yorkshire", British Medical Journal, (1930) I (3620): 944–46.
- "Bornholm Disease: Account of a Yorkshire Outbreak", British Medical Journal, (1933) 2 (3800) :817.
- "Epidemiology in Country Practice", Proceedings of the Royal Society of Medicine, 1935 August; 28 (10): 1337–1342.
- Epidemiology in Country Practice. John Wright & Sons, Bristol, 1939. Preface by Major Greenwood, FRS, FRCP. (Reissued 1949) (Reprinted Devonshire Press, Torquay, 1972 & in later editions by RCGP)
- "Trends of General Practice; A Hundred Years in a Yorkshire Dale", The Practitioner, 1951.
- "Sylvest's Disease", New England Journal of Medicine, 1954 Jun 17; 250 (24): 1033–6.
- "William Hillary; 1697–1763", British Medical Journal, 1957 Jan 12; 1 (5010): 102.
