= Brierfield, Lancashire =

Town in Lancashire, England

Coordinates: 53.824°N 2.235°W

Brierfield
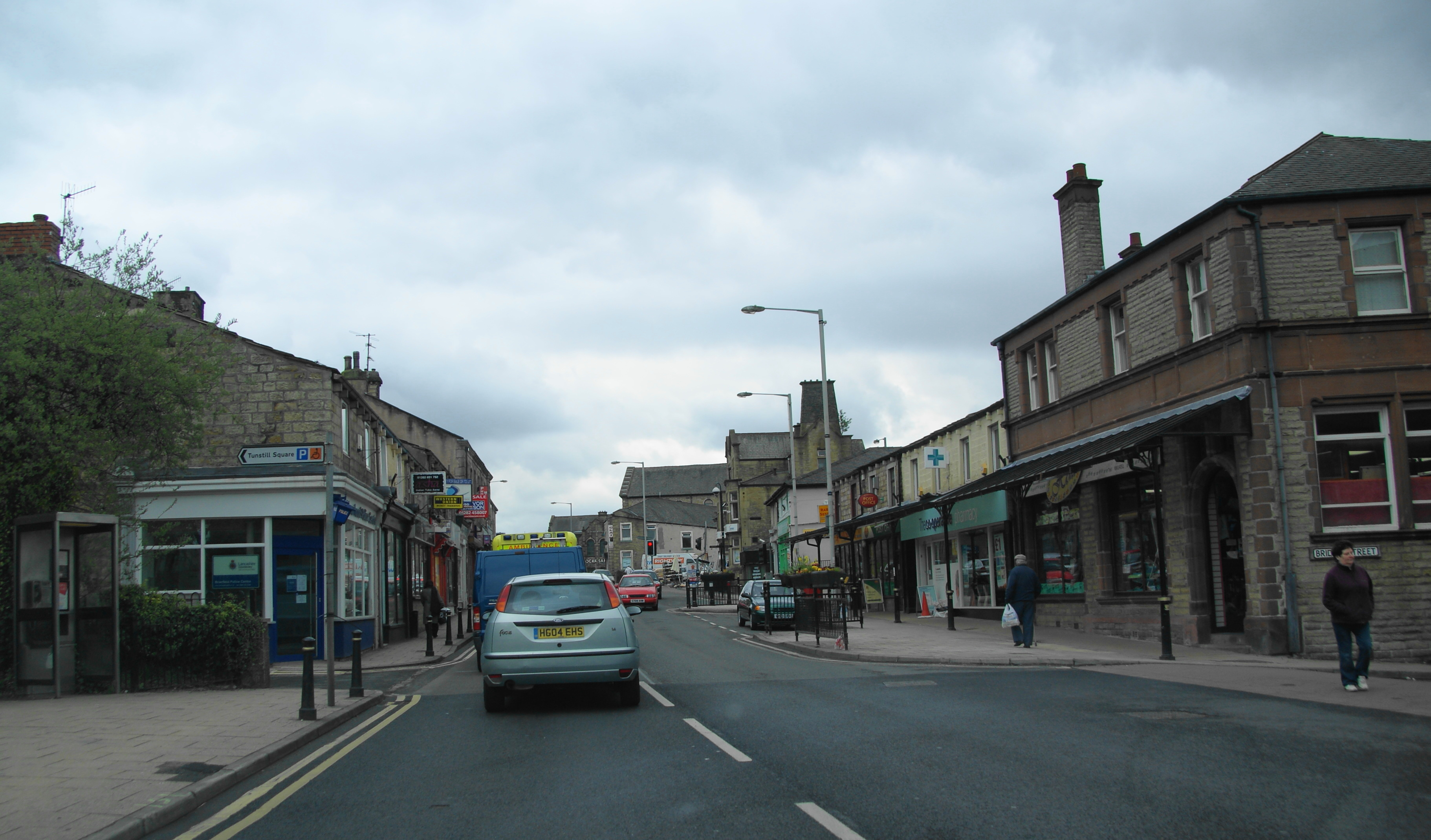
- Burnley Road, Brierfield

- Shown within Pendle Borough Location within Lancashire
- Population: 8,193 (2011)
- OS grid reference: SD850361
- Civil parish: Brierfield
- District: Pendle
- Shire county: Lancashire
- Region: North West
- Country: England
- Sovereign state: United Kingdom
- Post town: NELSON
- Postcode district: BB9
- Dialling code: 01282
- Police: Lancashire
- Fire: Lancashire
- Ambulance: North West
- UK Parliament: Burnley

Brierfield (/ˌbraɪ.ərˈfiːld/) is a town and civil parish in the Borough of Pendle, in Lancashire, England. It is 3 miles (4.8 km) north east of Burnley, 1 mile (1.6 km) south west of Nelson, and 1 mile (1.6 km) north east of Reedley. The parish had a population of 8,193, at the census of 2011.

The parish adjoins the Pendle parishes of Reedley Hallows, Old Laund Booth and Nelson, the Burnley parish of Briercliffe, and the unparished area of the town of Burnley.

== History ==
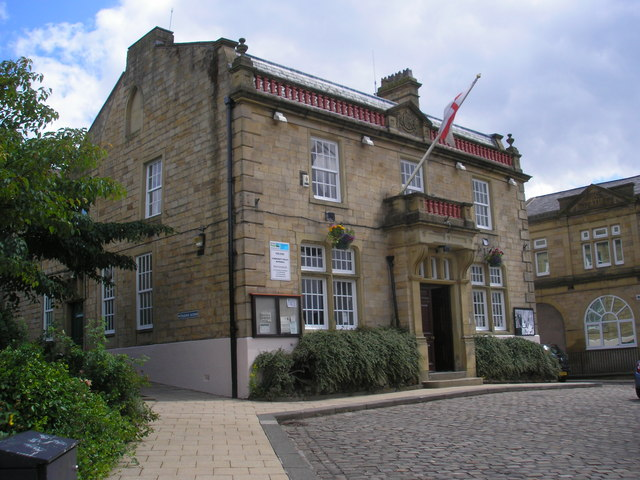
Brierfield Town Hall

The building of the Leeds and Liverpool Canal, the Blackburn to Addingham turnpike road, and the railway from Preston to Colne, led to the town developing during the 19th century.

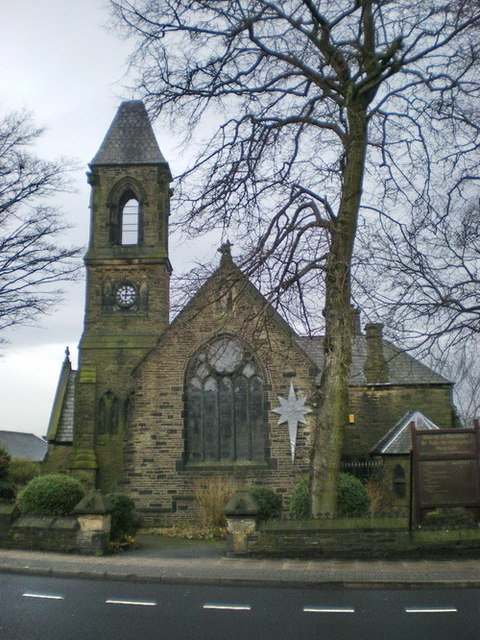
St Luke the Evangelist Church, Brierfield

Before the new transport links were constructed, the town was just a scattering of farmhouses forming part of Marsden township known as Little Marsden, which also covered a large part of what was to become Nelson. The land here was considered part of the manor of Ightenhill. The village of Marsden was centred on St Paul's Church just over the boundary with Nelson. Brierfield was likely one of Marsden's town fields, along presumably with Limefield and Mansfield, located within Brierfield parish, and Scholefield and others in Nelson. The older roads in the area connected Marsden with Burnley (Walverden Road), and Haggate (Halifax Road). A branch from latter at Marsden Heights (King's Causeway) descends the valley to cross Pendle Water into Pendle Forest. Chamber Hill next to the river here, was the site of an ancient property known as 'Chamber in Pendle', which belonged to the Radcliffe family of Winmarleigh and descended to Sir Gilbert Gerard in the late-16th century.

Considered part of the Burnley Coalfield, it is thought that coal was being mined in the vicinity in the early-17th century. Marsden Colliery, also known as Brierfield Pit, off Lob Lane (now Clitheroe Road) close to the canal, was begun around 1811 by the Executors of John Hargreaves company. It was the first colliery in the area to use endless chain haulage powered by a stationary steam engine which would be widely adopted during the 19th century. As Marsden was nearing the end of its reserves in 1872 an explosion in a disused section killed two men and caused an underground fire. Operations were wound down and the pit closed early in 1873.

The Ecroyd family of Edge End constructed Lomeshaye Mill as a water-powered worsted spinning mill on Pendle Water in 1780. And Jewel Mill over the river in Reedley Hallows is also thought to have been started, also for worsted production, at around the same time.

In 1838 the area's first cotton mill was constructed for Henry Tunstill on the east bank of the canal, next to the coal mine, and powered by a steam engine. After Henry's death in 1854, his sons formed Tunstill Brothers, and proceeded to erect a new six-story spinning mill at the site. Two further, adjoining four-storey buildings were added in 1868 and 1873 and the old mill demolished. Additional weaving shed space was added at the south end of the mill in 1876 and 1906. The last member of the family to run Brierfield Mills was Harry Tunstill who was involved in many other companies and was released as a director in 1928. The company was listed in a directory for 1948 and accredited with 79,284 mule spindles, 13,100 ring spindles, and 2800 looms, but failed in 1956. Smith & Nephew took over the mill for the production of surgical bandages in 1957.

New mills were established along the banks of the canal and people flocked to the area to work in the cotton industry, many coming from the lead mining areas of the North Riding of Yorkshire as the lead seams were worked out. The cotton industry continued to be the main employer, until well into the 1960s, and in October 2006 that BSN (formerly Smith & Nephew) ceased production of woven cloth, at Brierfield Mills. After years of disuse, Pendle Council purchased the mills in March 2012, intending to use it as the flagship regeneration project.

The town's war memorial features a large roaring bronze lion. The town is known for its part in the movement of the Quaker. A meeting house is still in use on the south eastern boundary of the town, and the bridge over Pendle Water at the foot of the town is called Quaker Bridge.

The town's small cinema, Unit Four, closed down on 3 July 1997. It was showing Batman & Robin, The Fifth Element, Con Air, and Beavis and Butt-Head Do America. The last film shown was Con Air, that day at 8.20pm. One reason it closed down was due to the opening of the new cinema in Burnley, Hollywood Park, which opened one month prior. It was later replaced by the branch of Dixy Chicken, as well as Maria's World Food Store.

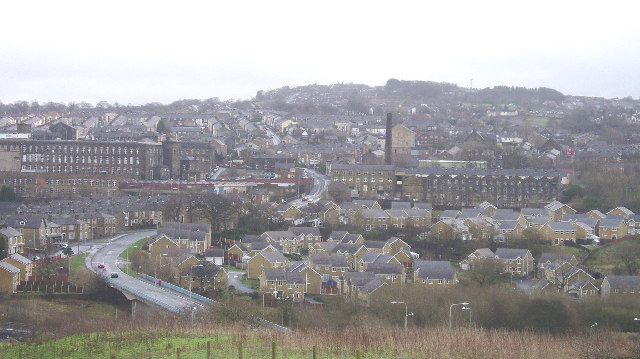
Skyline of Brierfield

== Governance ==
Brierfield was once part of the area of Marsden township known as Little Marsden in the ancient parish of Whalley, which became a civil parish in 1866. The area around Brierfield was made an urban district in 1894.

In 1974, under the Local Government Act 1972, Brierfield became part of the Borough of Pendle. Initially Brierfield formed part of an unparished area, in 1992 a new civil parish was created covering a similar but smaller area than the old urban district.

After boundary changes in 2020 which reduced the number of wards in the borough to 12, two cover parts of Brierfield parish – Brierfield East & Clover Hill and Brierfield West & Reedley. The town is represented on Lancashire County Council in two divisions: Brierfield & Nelson West and Pendle Hill.

Until 2024 the Member of Parliament for Pendle, the constituency into which the town falls, is Andrew Stephenson (Conservative), who was first elected in 2010. From 2024 onwards, Brierfield is in Burnley whom Oliver Ryan represents.

== Demography ==
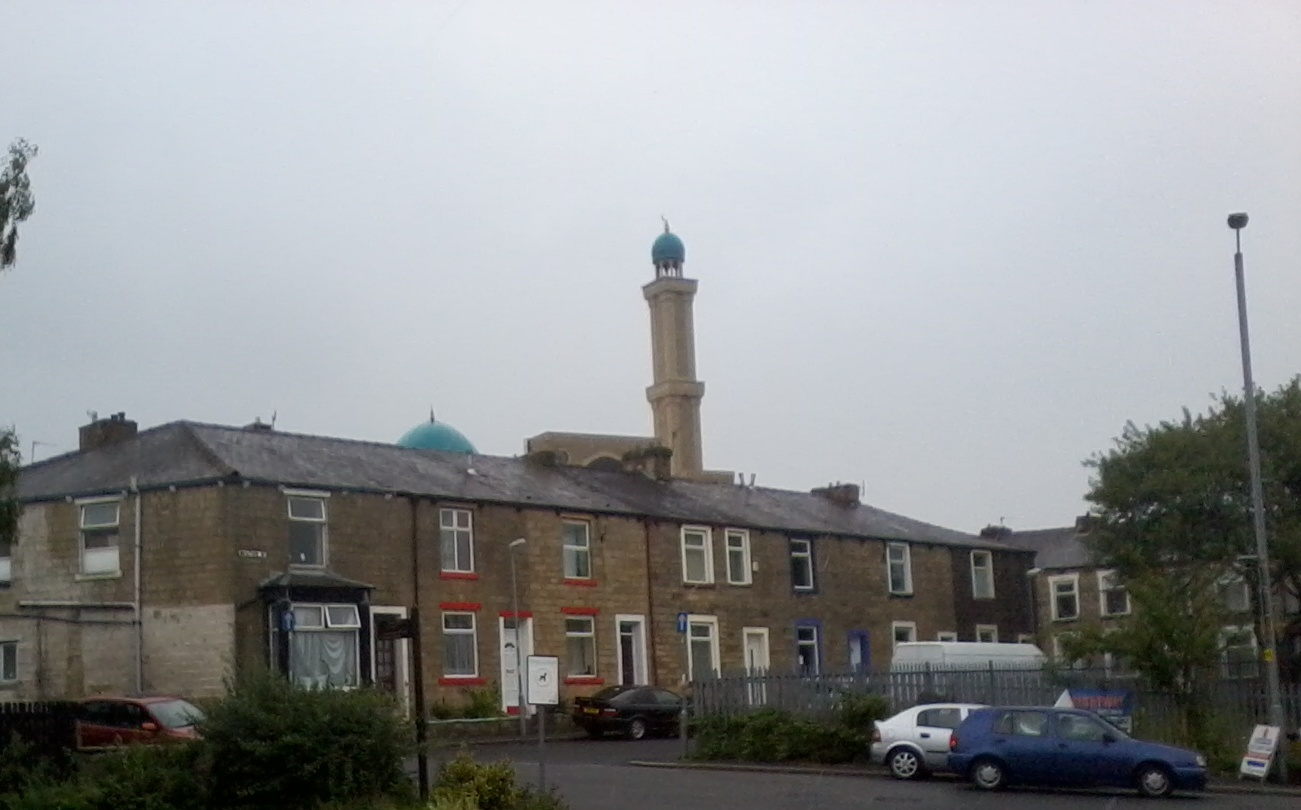
Houses in Brierfield and the Jamia Mosque Sultania, built in 2013, the largest mosque in Lancashire

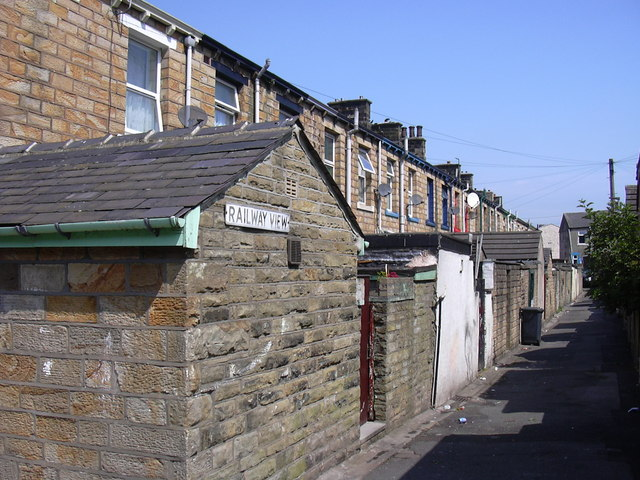
Terraced housing at Railway View

The United Kingdom Census 2011 showed a total resident population for Brierfield civil parish of 8,193. a marginal reduction from 8,199 in 2001. The town forms part of a wider urban area, which had a population of 149,796 in 2001, with 10,047 in a Brierfield subdivision . A similar but larger, Burnley Built-up area defined in the 2011 census had a population of 149,422.

The racial composition of the town in 2011 was 60.2% White (58.9% White British), 38.0% Asian, 0.4% Black, 0.2% Mixed and 1.2% Other. The largest religious groups were Christian (44.4%) and Muslim (36.2%). 59.5% of adults between the ages of 16 and 74 were classed as economically active and in work.

Population of Brierfield
Year	1901	1911	1921	1931	1939	1951	1961	2001	2011
Population	7,288	8,259	8,341	7,696	6,862	7,009	7,018	8,199	8,193
UD (pre-1974) CP (2001 onwards)

== Education ==
There are three primary schools, and one secondary school in Brierfield. The primary schools are Reedley Primary School, Pendle Primary Academy (formerly known as Walter Street) and Holy Trinity. The secondary school is Marsden Heights Community College. There is also one Nursery School (Woodfield Nursery School)

== Facilities ==
The town is served by Brierfield railway station.

Places of worship in the town include Jamia Mosque Sultania, built in 2013 with a capacity of 2,000 and the largest mosque in Lancashire, the 1861 grade II listed Brierfield Methodist Church and St Luke the Evangelist Church, the Anglican parish church.

== Media ==
Local news and television programmes are provided by BBC North West and ITV Granada. Television signals are received from the Winter Hill TV transmitter and the local relay TV transmitter located in the Forest of Pendle.

Local radio stations are BBC Radio Lancashire, Heart North West, Smooth North West, Central Radio North West, Greatest Hits Radio Lancashire, and Capital Manchester and Lancashire (formerly 2BR). Pendle Community Radio commenced broadcasting on 103.1FM in September 2005. Licensed by Ofcom as a distinct community radio service, it aims to target the borough's Muslim population, a large number of which reside in Brierfield.

The town is served by the local newspapers, Burnley Express and Lancashire Telegraph.

== Notable people ==
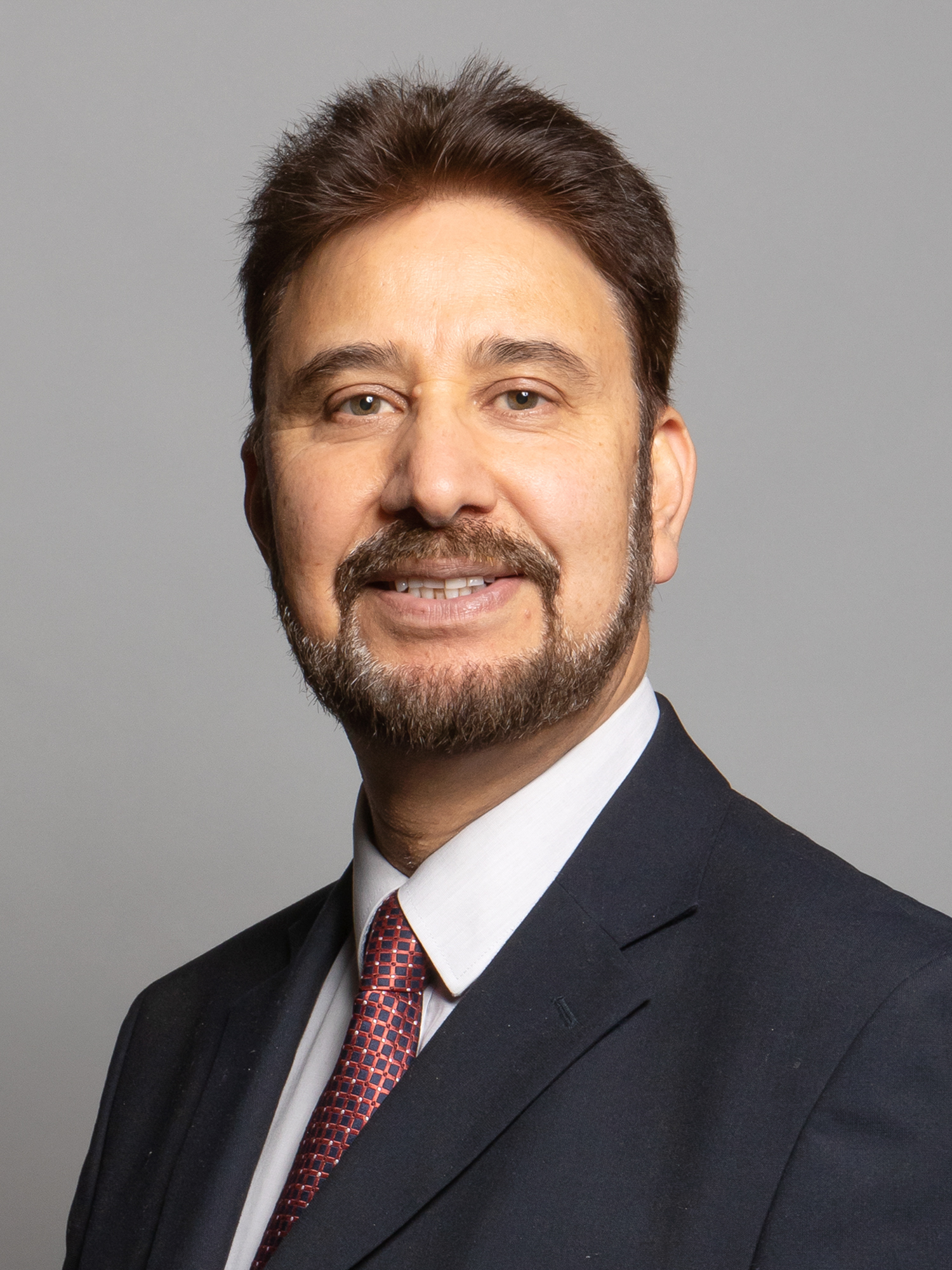
Afzal Khan MP, 2020

- Bernie Calvert (born 1942), former bass guitarist, with The Hollies from 1966 to 1981
- Alan Buck (1943-1994), drummer with The Four Pennies from 1962 to 1966
- Afzal Khan (born 1958), Lord Mayor of Manchester 2005 / 2006; MEP, 2014 / 2017; MP for Manchester Rusholme, since 2017.
- Sajjad Karim (born 1970), politician, member of the European Parliament from 2004 to 2019
- Lee Ingleby (born 1976), actor, played in the BBC Two miniseries Nature Boy (2000)

=== Sport ===
- Jimmy Mitton (1890–1949), professional footballer, played 160 games, including 88 for Stockport County
- Neville Bannister (born 1937), footballer who played about 190 games
- John Connelly (1938–2012), footballer who played 573 games and 20 for England, starting with 215 for Burnley

== See also ==
- Listed buildings in Brierfield, Lancashire
