= Listed buildings in Reedley Hallows =

Reedley Hallows is a civil parish in Pendle, Lancashire, England. It contains three listed buildings that are recorded in the National Heritage List for England. Of these, one is at Grade II*, the middle grade, and the others are at Grade II, the lowest grade. The parish is partly residential, containing a suburb of Burnley, with countryside to the west. The listed buildings are all houses, two 17th-century farmhouses, and a modern town house.

== Key ==
Grade	Criteria
II*	Particularly important buildings of more than special interest
II	Buildings of national importance and special interest

== Buildings ==
Name and location	Photograph	Date	Notes	Grade
Ingham's Farmhouse; 53.80963°N 2.26104°W	—	Early to mid 17th century	The house is in partly rendered sandstone with quoins, and has a stone-slate roof with stone ridge tiles. It has two storeys and originally had two bays, with an additional bay added later to the right. Most of the windows in the original bays date from the 19th century, and elsewhere are mullioned windows, some of them stepped. One doorway has a chamfered surround, and the other is plain.	II
Greenhead Farmhouse; 53.82054°N 2.26096°W		Mid 17th century	A stone house with quoins and a stone-slate roof in two storeys with an attic. On the front is a three-storey porch that contains a window with Gothic and Venetian features. The windows are mullioned, those in the lower two floors with dripstones. Its interior is well preserved and includes an inglenook.	II*
Domus; 53.81690°N 2.23647°W	—	1958	The house was designed by Alan Chambers in modern style. It stands on a sloping site with one storey facing the road and two storeys at the rear. The house has a T-shaped plan and is constructed in brown brick with rendered wood plates. The ground floor contains open plan living and dining areas, and in the lower floor are a kitchen, bedrooms, and associated rooms.	II
