= Empire of Mind =

2005 book by Michael Strangelove

The Empire of Mind
- Front cover of The Empire of Mind
- Author: Michael Strangelove
- Language: English
- Series: Digital Futures
- Publisher: University of Toronto Press
- Publication date: 2005
- Publication place: Canada
- Pages: 337

The Empire of Mind: Digital Piracy and the Anti-Capitalist Movement is a book by Michael Strangelove first published in 2005. It explores how digital piracy and cultural appropriation within art and popular culture by Internet users influences cultural reproduction within capitalism. It was a Canadian Governor-General’s Award finalist in the category of non-fiction in 2006.

== Overview ==
According to Strangelove, the economic system known as capitalism promotes unequal class, race and gender relations. Thus capitalism invariably produces resistance. This resistance takes the form of a contest over the meaning of things and events. Structural changes in the architecture of communication lead to new forms and strategies of resistance. The Empire of Mind identifies characteristics of these structural changes and outlines their implications for resistance to capitalism’s definitional control over meaning.

The Empire of Mind describes a theory of cultural transmission that takes into account a new structure of communication that is not found in the corporate (commercial) media systems of the pre-Internet era. Within this theory of cultural transmission the notion of an empire of mind is used to describe how capitalism operates as 'a violent and controlling system' (p. 10) that "tends toward totalization, embracing all before it within its homogenizing logic of social organization" (p. 12). While Strangelove describes capitalism as having a tendency towards totalization he also argues that such forces as consumer resistance and competition between corporations has ensured that capitalism has never achieved total control over individuals.

The Empire of Mind includes an analysis of culture jamming which provides an example of how Internet-based cultural production subverts dominant symbolic economies and ideologies and paves the way for the emergence of new symbolic economies (belief systems). Culture jamming is presented as one example of the Internet audience's tendency to subvert privately owned meanings. Strangelove makes no claims about the overall potency or potential of culture jamming. Neither does he claim that the Internet heralds the envitable destruction of capitalism. While Strangelove does argue that the Internet is part of a new symbolic economy he makes no predictions as to the future state (dystopic or utopic) of capitalism's belief system.

Strangelove provides a scholarly definition of the term empire of mind and applies it within an analysis of new and old media. Given the premise that capitalism operates as a meaning-production system that exercises substantial control over our cultures and minds—an empire of mind --- the Internet is seen as subverting the dominant flow of meaning within capitalism's symbolic empire.

== Related uses of the term "Empire of (the) Mind" ==
The notion of an "empire of mind" (usually seen expressed as an "empire of the mind") has been found in literature since Alexis De Tocqueville first used it in the following oft quoted passage:

I consider the people of the United States as that portion of the English people which is commissioned to explore the wilds of the New World; whilst the rest of the nation, enjoying more leisure and less harassed by the drudgery of life, may devote its energies to thought, and enlarge in all directions the empire of the mind. The position of the Americans is therefore quite exceptional, and it may be believed that no democratic people will ever be placed in a similar one.

The phrase an "empire of the mind" usually denotes imperialism or a specific empire and has been applied to the United States, Britain, India, Iran and ancient Greece. Strangelove's use of the phrase was inspired by Sir Winston Churchill's statement, "The empires of the future are the empires of the mind."

== Commentary on the thesis of The Empire of Mind ==
Howard A. Doughty writes that Strangelove "seems to have achieved a position of sensible moderation, an attitude toward the driving force of postmodern culture that allows it to be redeemed, rather than replaced. He embraces the liberal virtues of humanistic reformism. While supporting an attack on authoritarianism, sexism and fast food through new communications techniques, he avoids the logocentrism and the allegedly false promises of nineteenth and twentieth-century revolutionary thinkers."

According to Christopher Moore, Strangelove "believes the fundamental empire today is capitalism’s. It operates, he argues, not just through state systems and the marketplace, but by propagating an empire of the mind that takes capitalism for granted. Capitalism is a meaning-production system, he declares ... The goal of capitalism’s empire is the commodification of everything."

== Summary of academic reviews ==
A review of this book by Darren Wershler-Henry in the Canadian Journal of Communication states, "There is also an inconsistency between Strangelove’s criteria for a useful model of the Internet and that for his model of capitalism. "Within critical theory," writes Strangelove, "philosophical and economic enquiry tends to recreate the Internet in the image of the twentieth century" (p. 98). Fair enough, but why does Strangelove rely on a model of capitalism that is every bit as dated?"

A review of this book by Tarleton Gillespie in New Media and Society notes that "Strangelove is working very much from within a Marxist, critical theory of communication and society" and questions Strangelove's claim that "the file-trading of commercial music and film, which he sees as a widespread disregard for the principle of property, is not an aberration, but is in fact the resting state of the Internet."

A review in Canadian Literature: A Quarterly of Criticism and Review, by Michael Truscello, notes that Strangelove "is quick to point out, repeatedly, that he is not projecting utopian ends for Internet communication; rather, his "concern" is with what he calls "embryonic dynamics," emergent possibilities that may not realize a transformation of the social order for some time. In essence, "by simply allowing all voices a forum, the Internet subverts the hegemonic construction of reality." Hegemonic appeals are unsustainable in an environment of "unconstrained communicative action," he suggests, and this is "the heart of the Internet's most probable long-term social effect."

A review in The Communication Review by Scott Uzelman notes that the "empire of mind" as defined by Strangelove "standardizes beliefs and wants that are "engineered" or "programmed" by capitalism and "constructed through the corporate media which acts as a propaganda tool for the elite."" Yet the reviewer contends that "'capitalism is not reducible to a belief system".

A review in Politics and Culture, by Alex Kashnabish, describes The Empire of Mind as a book that "challenges the prevailing assumptions surrounding the Internet and its possibilities". Kashnabish writes that this book "is at its strongest and most convincing when taking up the analysis of the Internet and its relationship to capitalism’s symbolic economy as well as in regards to the significant – if not insurmountable – challenges involved in enclosing the Internet and turning it into fully corporatized space. In both these respects, Strangelove’s argument is nuanced and persuasive." The reviewer suggests that Strangelove overstates the potential of culture jamming.
