= Listed buildings in Brierfield, Lancashire =

Brierfield is a small town and civil parish in Pendle, Lancashire, England. It contains seven listed buildings that are recorded in the National Heritage List for England. All of the listed buildings are designated at Grade II, the lowest of the three grades, which is applied to "buildings of national importance and special interest". The listed buildings are varied in type, consisting of a house, two religious buildings, a bridge over the Leeds and Liverpool Canal, the Town Hall, a war memorial, and a former cotton mill.

== Buildings ==
Name and location	Photograph	Date	Notes
Clay Cottage; 53.82394°N 2.21705°W	—	18th century	A stone house with a cement tile roof in two storeys. There are two two-light sash windows in each floor, and an off-centre doorway with a chamfered surround. To the left is a modern extension.
The Limes; 53.82412°N 2.21949°W		c. 1760	Originally the Friends' Meeting House, it is in stone with a slate roof. There are two storeys and five bays. The square-headed windows have mullions, or mullions and transoms, and the off-centre doorway has a moulded surround.
Canal bridge No 138; 53.82725°N 2.23740°W		1795	A stone accommodation bridge over the Leeds and Liverpool Canal. It consists of a single elliptical arch with rusticated voussoirs, a plain coped parapet, and curved abutments that end in piers.
Town Hall; 53.82455°N 2.23379°W		Mid 19th century	Originally a house, becoming the town hall in 1901 when additions were made to the front. The building is in stone with two storeys and a mansard roof. The central doorway has a three-light fanlight, and above it is a balustraded balcony on consoles. In the ground floor are two cross windows, and above are three sashes. At the top of the building is a balustraded parapet.
Brierfield Methodist Church; 53.82495°N 2.23449°W		1861	The church is in stone with a blue slate roof, and is in Italianate style. There are two storeys and four bays. The symmetrical entrance front has steps leasing up to a pair of central doorways with Doric pilasters, a triglyph frieze and a dentil cornice. The windows in the ground floor have rounded heads, and those above have segmental heads. Over these is a pediment with dentils containing an oval inscribed plaque with an edge of laurel leaves.
Brierfield Mills; 53.8250°N 2.2379°W		1868	A cotton mill in Italianate style that continued expanding until 1907. It is in stone with a roof of slate and corrugated iron. The office block has two storeys and six bays, it is pedimented, and has round-headed windows. Beside it is a ten-bay warehouse range, and behind this are other buildings, including a four-stage clock tower with a pyramidal top. Alongside the Leeds and Liverpool Canal is the spinning mill, which has four storeys and 39 bays.
Brierfield Cenotaph; 53.82482°N 2.23381°W	—	1921	A war memorial in the form of a cenotaph, consisting of a buttressed stone pylon on a base of two steps. Towards its top is a bronze wreath, below which is an inscribed plaque. In front of the cenotaph is a bronze sculpture of a lion. The memorial is inscribed the names of those who died in the Second Boer War and in the First and Second World Wars. The whole memorial is surrounded by decorated iron railings.
