= Epidemiology in Country Practice =

Book by William Pickles

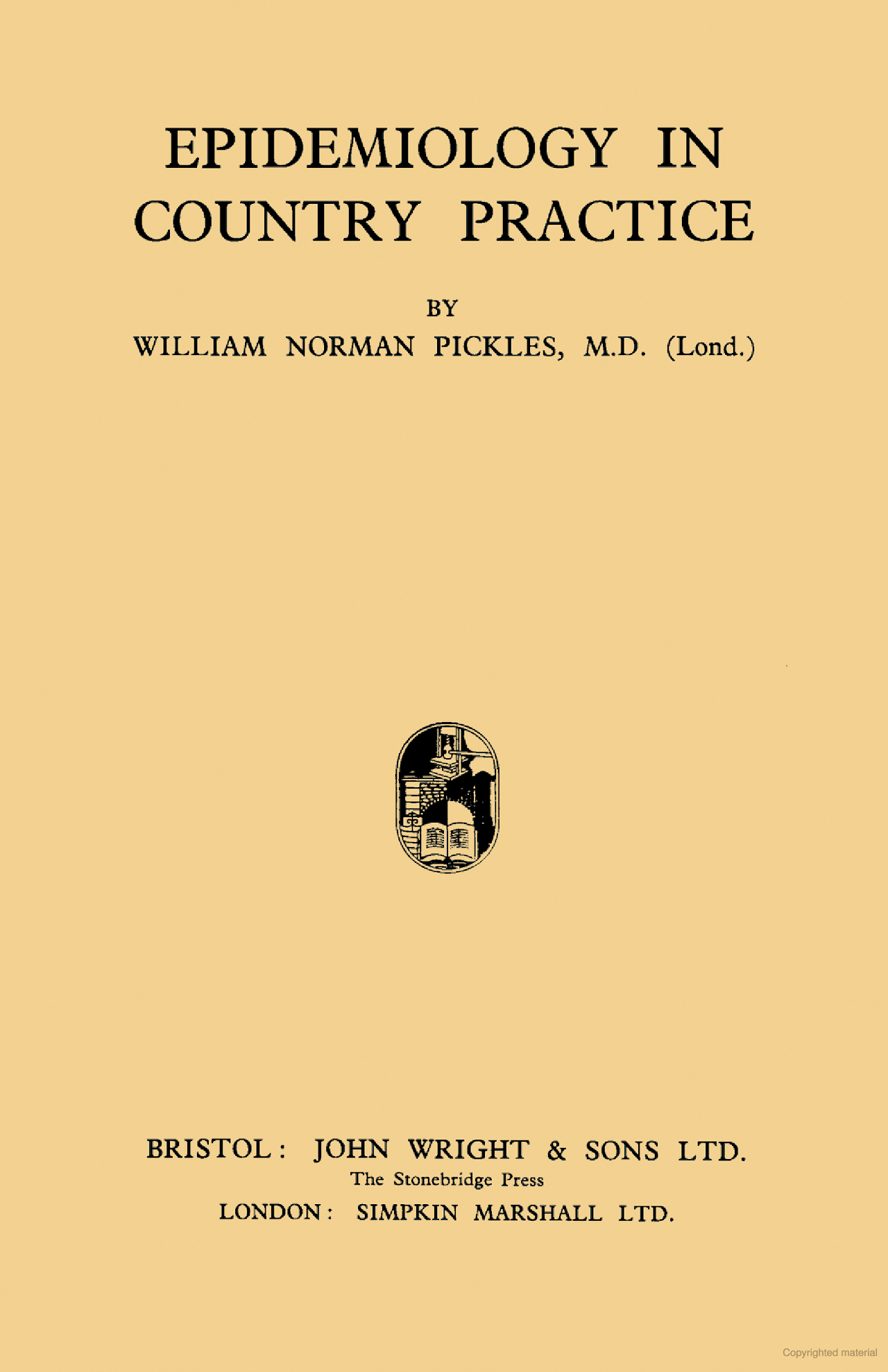
- Epidemiology in Country Practice, 1949 reissue
- Author: William Pickles
- Language: English
- Subject: Epidemiology
- Publisher: John Wright & Sons
- Publication date: 1939

Epidemiology in Country Practice is a book by William Pickles (1885–1969), a rural general practitioner (GP) physician in Wensleydale, North Yorkshire, England, first published in 1939. The book reports on how careful observations can lead to correlations between transmission of infective disease between families, farms and villages.

It contains the detailed observational studies of a 1928 epidemic of catarrhal jaundice and a 1929 epidemic of Bornholm disease which were published in the British Medical Journal (BMJ) in 1930 and 1933 respectively.

== Background ==
William Pickles first realised the possibilities for epidemiological studies for a GP after he read James Mackenzie's The Principles of Diagnosis and Treatment in Heart Affections in the 1920s.

With the assistance of his wife Gertie, who kept the charts, Pickles recorded his observations on a 1928 epidemic of catarrhal jaundice and a 1929 epidemic of Bornholm Disease in his district. His findings were published in the British Medical Journal in 1930 and 1933 respectively and in 1935 he presented them at the Royal Society of Medicine. The work was praised by Major Greenwood who wrote that Pickles's work would mark a "new era in epidemiology". His observations led to new understandings of the transmission of infective disease within families, farms and villages.

== Research and content ==
Epidemiology in Country Practice contains Pickles's observational studies and a number of articles previously published in medical journals, including the detailed observational studies of the 1928 epidemic of jaundice and the 1929 epidemic of Bornholm disease. The book has been described as more of an essay on epidemiology than a book filled with masses of data.

Most of the research was done between 1929 and 1939. From 1937, in order to work on the book, Pickles kept evening surgeries "to a minimum and often there were no patients at all". He methodically reported patterns of prevalent diseases in his area; however, his data collection and publications lacked the consent processes now considered necessary to avoid identification of individuals afflicted by epidemics, particularly in small communities where recognition of persons is deemed easier. Pickles was well acquainted with the eight villages he looked after, and once, as he looked down upon Wensleydale from the top of a hill, realised that he knew everyone in the village and most on first-name basis.

The book begins with a personal appeal by Pickles for GPs to consider the importance of observations, followed by eight chapters that cover cases such as "influenza, measles, scarlet fever, whooping-cough, and mumps", as a well as jaundice and myalgia. One story is that of a "gypsy" who accompanied her sick husband into the village in a caravan. Her husband was suffering from typhoid and Pickles was able to trace the source of the disease to a faulty water pump that the wife used to wash her laundry. In the book, he compares the case to the work of one of his heroes, William Budd, who carried out similar observations.

The book also describes an epidemic of catarrhal jaundice that resulted in 250 cases out of a population of almost 6,000, many of which were children. The exact incubation period was not known and ranged from 3 to 40 days. After two years of keeping records and with assistance from the Ministry of Health, Pickles was able to show that the incubation period was 26–35 days. He cross-referenced the evidence with smaller studies in neighbouring villages and in one case was able to trace 13 infections to a single country maid who was determined to attend a fete despite Pickles attending to her in her sickbed the same morning. One of the cases was another young woman and her male friend who, according to his (the man's) sister, often went "in the back door in the evenings, and helps her wash up", causing Pickles to observe that "studies in epidemiology sometimes reveal romances."

== Publication history ==
The book was first published by John Wright & Sons of Bristol in 1939. It had a preface by Major Greenwood, professor of epidemiology and vital statistics at the University of London. In April 1941, during the Second World War, the entire stock of the book, unbound sheets and the type were completely destroyed by enemy action but such was the demand for the book that in 1949 it was reissued in virtually identical form.

In 1970, a limited edition was published with profits going to the Royal College of General Practitioners (RCGP) appeal. The book was subsequently reprinted by Devonshire Press of Torquay in 1972 and in later editions by the RCGP (1984: ISBN 0-85084-097-X).

== Reception and legacy ==
The book was described by John Horder in 1969 as a "classic", that "makes it all sound too easy and one wonders why no one had thought of it all before". Pickles's obituary in the British Medical Journal in 1969 declared that it had "received excellent notices" and in 2004, J.A. Reid portrayed it as "a seminal book that has been read and assessed during past decades by many public health students and practitioners". Later, RCGP president Denis Pereira Gray described it as "a masterpiece recognised throughout the world" and that practice-based research should be modelled on Pickles's thorough and accurate recording.

The book facilitated the link between research and primary care, resulting in the modern expansion of surveillance practices for improvements in public health. In addition, it revealed that general practitioners could carry out "world class research" in the community.
