= Jamia Mosque Sultania, Brierfield =

Mosque in Lancashire, England

Jamia Mosque Sultania
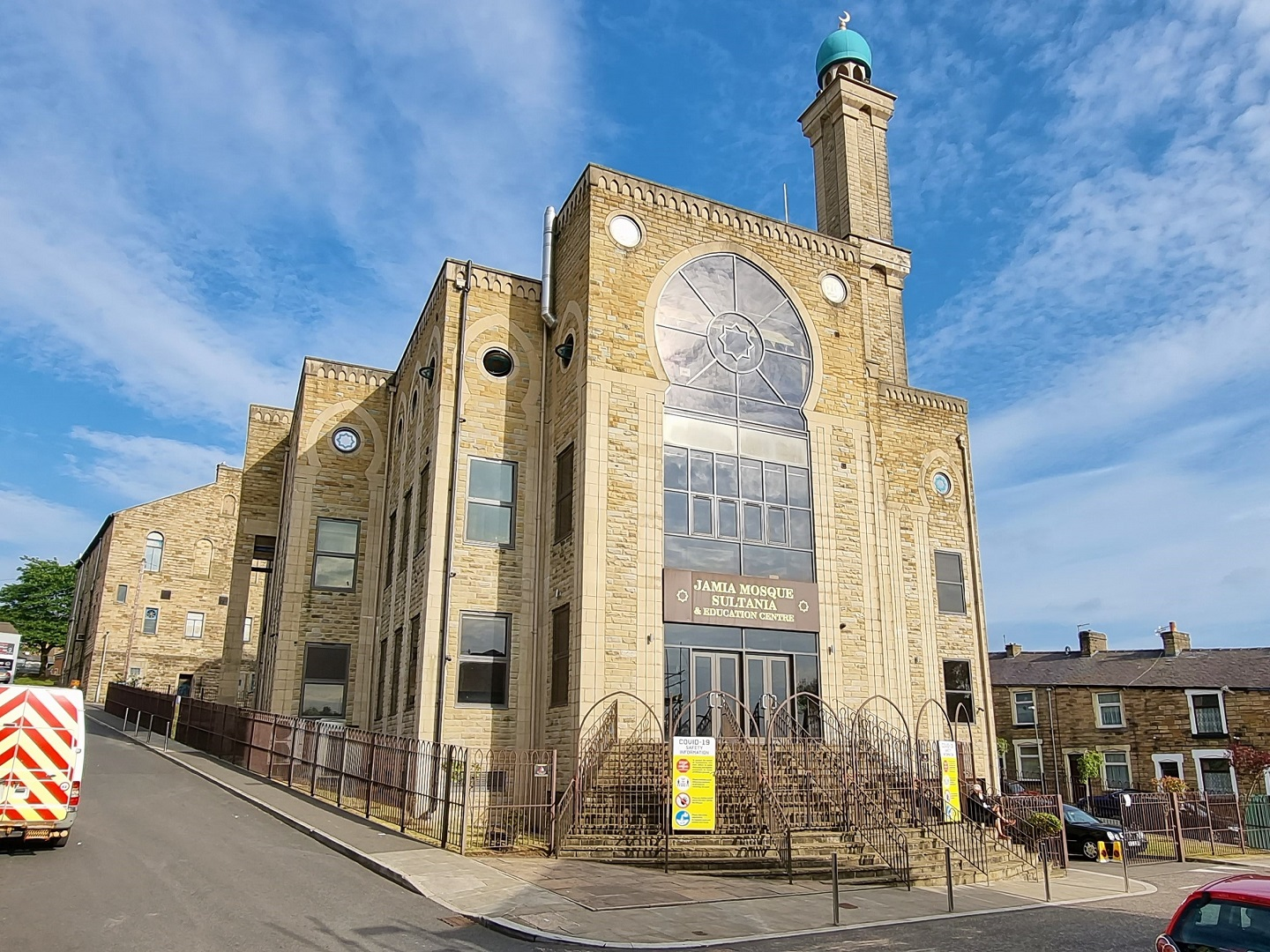
- The Jamia Mosque Sultania.

- Location within Lancashire

Religion
- Affiliation: Islam
- Status: Active

Location
- Location: Brierfield, Lancashire, England
- Coordinates: 53.823228°N 2.235224°W

Architecture
- Type: Mosque
- Style: Islamic Architecture
- Completed: 2013

Specifications
- Capacity: 2,000
- Minaret: 1

Website
- www.facebook.com/sultaniamosquebrierfield

Jamia Mosque Sultania is a mosque (masjid) in Brierfield, Lancashire, England. It is the largest mosque in the ceremonial county of Lancashire.

== History ==
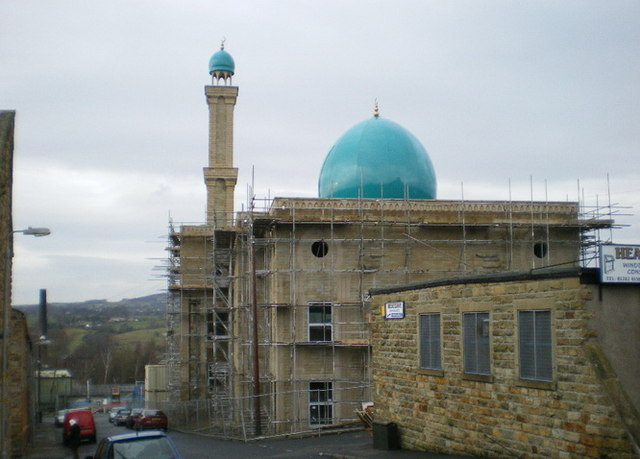
The mosque during construction in 2013.

The mosque was built in 2013 under the Mosque Membership of the local Muslim community and was completed at a cost of £2 million. The mosque also includes a dome and minaret like many traditional Islamic mosques and some of Lancashire's own mosques. Due to its elevated height, worship capacity and brickwork. It is claimed to be the largest mosque in Lancashire. As of 2021 it was the newest purpose built mosque in the Pendle.

The main prayer hall can accommodate approximately 2,000 worshippers.

== See also ==
- Islam in the United Kingdom
- Islamic schools and branches
- List of mosques in the United Kingdom
