= Vodka eyeballing =

Ingesting alcohol by applying it to the eyes

Vodka eyeballing is the practice of consuming vodka by pouring it into the eye sockets, where it is absorbed through the mucous membranes of the region into the bloodstream. Reports of this practice as a new fad surfaced in the media beginning in 2010, as hundreds of clips of persons purporting to engage in the practice were posted on YouTube. The practice is promoted by advocates as causing rapid intoxication, but the amount of alcohol absorbed by the eye is low.

Some observers maintained that the phenomenon was not a real craze, describing the coverage as a media feeding frenzy and part of "a long history of trend pieces that come out of nowhere". The initial press coverage in British tabloid The Daily Mail was criticized for basing its entire story on an injury from a single student stunt, and extrapolating this into a "trend" after a YouTube search showed hundreds of similar videos. Journalist Michael Strangelove said that the videos, which date back to 2006, seemed genuine and should not be dismissed as a deceptive "prank" against the media.

The 2000 comedy film Kevin & Perry Go Large includes a character called Eyeball Paul who engages in the practice.

The practice formed part of the fictional plot of the February 6, 2013 episode of the Canadian TV series Trauma, leading to a young woman receiving (successful) cornea transplants.

== Adverse effects ==
Vodka eyeballing can cause corneal abrasions and scarring, promote angiogenesis in the eye (and thereby cause loss of vision), and increase the risk for eye infections; it has been condemned by the American Academy of Ophthalmology.

== See also ==
- Alcohol enema
- Alcohol inhalation
