= Brierfield Town Hall =

Municipal building in Brierfield, Lancashire, England

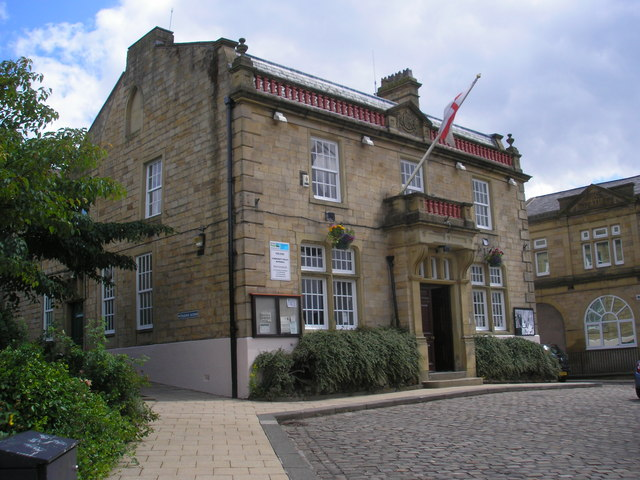
- Brierfield Town Hall

- Shown in Lancashire Location in Borough of Pendle
- 53.8246°N 2.2340°W
- Location: Colne Road, Brierfield

History
- Built: 1833

Site notes
- Architectural style: Neo-Georgian style

Listed Building – Grade II
- Official name: Town Hall
- Designated: 29 January 1988
- Reference no.: 1361692

Brierfield Town Hall is a municipal building in Colne Road, Brierfield, Lancashire, England. The structure, which is the headquarters of Brierfield Town Council, is a Grade II listed building.

== History ==
The building, which was originally known as Brierfield House, was built in 1883 as a private house for Henry Tunstill, who also commissioned Brierfield Mill, the town's first cotton mill and later served as the chairman of the local board of health. It passed down the Tunstall family until Robert Tunstall died in 1890.

After significant population growth, largely associated with the coal and worsted industries, the area became an urban district in 1894. The new civic leaders acquired the building from the Tunstall family and, after converting it for municipal use, re-opened it as Brierfield Town Hall in 1901. Following the conversion, the design involved a symmetrical main frontage with three bays facing onto Colne Road; the central bay, which slightly projected forward, featured a doorway with a three-light fanlight flanked by brackets supporting an entablature and an ornamental balustrade; the outer bays on the ground floor contained cross-windows; there were casement windows on the first floor and, at roof level, there was a balustrade and a central pediment with the council coat of arms in the tympanum. A fire station was erected to the immediate south of the town hall at around the same time.

The town hall continued to serve as the headquarters of the district council for much of the 20th century but ceased to be the local seat of government when the enlarged Pendle Borough Council was formed at Nelson in 1974. It subsequently operated as an events venue for community functions in the local area.

A new civil parish, which covered a smaller area than the old urban district, was created for Brierfield in 1992. However, the new parish council, which was styled Brierfield Town Council, chose to use the Brierfield Community Centre further up Colne Road as its meeting place. A review of the conditions at the town hall carried out in September 2009 was highly critical; the report noted a lack of access for disabled people and the unwelcoming appearance of the building.

After Pendle District Council found itself having to make significant savings to avoid a loss of efficiency support grant from the UK Government in April 2014, both the town hall and the community centre were threatened with closure: Brierfield Town Council then agreed to take over the management of both buildings. However, in December 2014, the town council was then criticised for doubling the hire rates charged to community groups and other people seeking to use the two venues.

== See also ==
- Listed buildings in Brierfield, Lancashire
