= Jimmy Mitton =

English footballer

Personal information
- Full name: James Mitton
- Date of birth: 1890
- Place of birth: Brierfield, England
- Date of death: 1949 (aged 58–59)
- Height: 5 ft 8 in (1.73 m)
- Position: Centre half

Senior career*
Years	Team	Apps	(Gls)
1909–1910	Glossop	0	(0)
1910–1921	Stockport County	88	(6)
1921–1923	Exeter City	72	(2)
1923–1924	Nelson	0	(0)
Total		160	(8)
- * Club domestic league appearances and goals

James Mitton (1890–1949) was an English professional footballer who played as a centre-half. He made 160 appearances in the Football League for Stockport County and Exeter City.

== Career ==
Born in Brierfield, Lancashire, Mitton started his career with Glossop but did not make a first-team appearance for the club before joining Stockport County in 1910. He made 56 league and cup appearances for the side over the next five seasons before football in England was abandoned due to the outbreak of the First World War. When competitive football resumed in 1919, Mitton returned to Stockport and played a further 34 league matches before leaving the club in 1921.

Mitton subsequently joined Third Division South outfit Exeter City and quickly established himself as a first-team regular, making 40 league appearances during the 1921–22 campaign. He went on to play 32 games the following season before returning to Lancashire to sign for newly promoted Second Division side Nelson in 1923. However, he failed to make an appearance during his one season with the Seedhill club, and retired from professional football in the summer of 1924.
