= Alcohol enema =

Introducing alcohol into the rectum via the anus

An alcohol enema, also known colloquially as butt-chugging or boofing, is the act of introducing alcohol into the rectum and colon via the anus, i.e., as an enema. This method of alcohol consumption can be dangerous and even deadly because it leads to faster intoxication than drinking since the alcohol is absorbed directly into the bloodstream and bypasses the body's ability to reject the toxin by vomiting.

== Administration ==
Two reported techniques specific to alcohol enemas are by inserting into the rectum either an alcohol-soaked tampon or tubing connected to a funnel into which alcohol is poured, known as a beer bong.

Enema bags of the sort used medically, e.g., to remedy constipation, are also employed.

== Effects and dangers ==
Compared to drinking, alcohol intoxication begins far more quickly upon rectal consumption since the alcohol is absorbed directly into the bloodstream. The lower gastrointestinal tract lacks the alcohol dehydrogenase enzyme present in the stomach and liver that breaks down ethanol into acetylaldehyde, due to the lack of this enzyme, concentrated alcohol can cause immediate damage to the mucosal lining, which can cause bleeding. Acetaldehyde is more toxic than ethanol and is the primary cause of many chronic effects associated with alcohol consumption. When rectally absorbed, ethanol will still eventually arrive at the liver, but the high alcohol content could overwhelm the organ. Additionally, consuming the alcohol rectally neutralizes the body's ability to reject the toxin by vomiting.

== Native American ritual usages ==
The Maya ritually administered enemas of alcohol as an entheogen, sometimes adding other psychoactive substances, seeking to reach a state of ecstasy. Syringes of gourd and clay were used to inject the fluid.

== Incidents ==
In May 2004, a 58-year-old man of Lake Jackson, Texas died after his wife administered an alcohol enema. In total, the man is thought to have been given at least three liters of sherry (containing at least 45 cL alcohol). He suffered from alcoholism and had difficulty ingesting alcohol orally because of a painful throat ailment. His wife was indicted on a charge of negligent homicide. In August 2007, prosecutors dropped the charges due to insufficient evidence.

An enema bag filled with white wine and taken as a self-administered enema killed a 52-year-old man with klismaphilia. He was found dead with the nozzle still inserted in his anus and connected to an enema bag that hung from a coat rack next to his bed.

=== In popular culture ===
The 2018 comedy Blockers features a recurring joke about butt-chugging that culminates in John Cena's character performing an act of butt-chugging at a party.

== See also ==
- Alcohol inhalation
- Vodka eyeballing
