= Harry Tunstill =

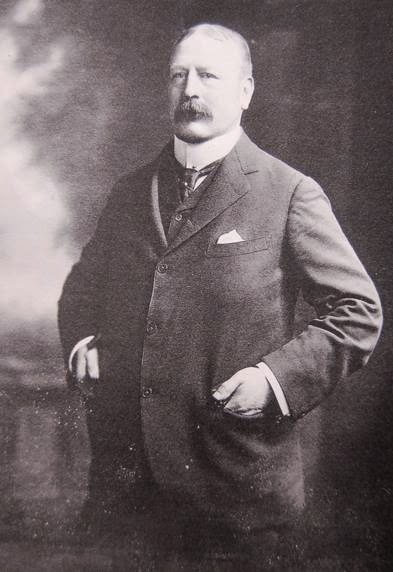
Harry Tunstill

Harry Tunstill (19 November 1852 - 11 May 1928) was a wealthy mill-owner from Lancashire, England.

== Early life and family ==
Harry Tunstill was born on 19 November 1852 to William and Mary Tunstill. He was Christened at Barrowford, Lancashire, which was also his place of residence.

Tunstill married Margaret Ecroyd in 1879, the daughter of a cotton manufacturer in East Lancashire. They lived at Oak Lodge, in the Little Marsden area of Nelson, where their first three children were all born. These were Mary Cicely (February 1880), Harry Gilbert (August 1881) and Margaret Farrer (known as "Meta") (1884). They subsequently moved to Montford Hall, near Fence, where the couple had five more daughters, Edith Dorothea ("Dolly"), Rosamond, Alice Ecroyd, Gertrude Adelaide (Gertie) and Constance Sybil (Sybil). Gertrude married the physician William Pickles in 1917.

== Career ==
Harry Tunstill joined the family firm of Tunstill Brothers which owned a number of cotton mills and employed around 1,500 people, working with his father William Tunstill (died 1903) and his brother Robert (1860-1902). After their deaths, Harry became the sole owner of the business which was incorporated in 1904 as Brierfield Mills Limited. His co-directors were W.H. Hartley and J.W. Fyson. At that time the company owned two spinning mills and three weaving sheds.

== Death ==
Tunstill died 11 May 1928. His address at the time of his death was Thornton Lodge, Thornton Rust near Aysgarth, North Yorkshire. He left an estate of £160,268 (the equivalent of £12.2 million as of 2023 (Note: UK Retail Price Index inflation figures are based on data from Clark, Gregory (2017). "The Annual RPI and Average Earnings for Britain, 1209 to Present (New Series)". MeasuringWorth.)).
