= The Practitioner =

Medical journal

- Discipline: Medicine
- Language: English

Publication details
- History: 1868-present
- Publisher: Macmillan Publishers
- Frequency: Quarterly

Standard abbreviations
- ISO 4: Practitioner

Links
- Journal homepage

The Practitioner (ISSN 0032-6518) is a medical journal established in 1868 by Macmillan Publishers with Francis Anstie as the editor.
