= Reedley Hallows =

Civil parish in Lancashire, England

Coordinates: 53.816°N 2.235°W

Reedley
- Location in Pendle Borough Location within Lancashire
- Population: 1,960 (2011)
- OS grid reference: SD845355
- Civil parish: Reedley Hallows
- District: Pendle
- Shire county: Lancashire
- Region: North West
- Country: England
- Sovereign state: United Kingdom
- Post town: BURNLEY
- Postcode district: BB10
- Dialling code: 01282
- Police: Lancashire
- Fire: Lancashire
- Ambulance: North West
- UK Parliament: Pendle

Reedley Hallows or Reedley is a civil parish in the Borough of Pendle in Lancashire, England. It forms part of Burnley and Brierfield. It had a population of 1,994, reducing to 1,960 at the 2011 Census.

It is on the Leeds and Liverpool Canal, and the construction of a marina started in January 2008 and is expected to be completed in September. The local railway station, Reedley Hallows Halt on the East Lancashire Line, closed in 1956. The marina, and the site of the railway station, are both outside the current boundary of the parish, and are in an unparished area, which is part of the town of Burnley.

== History ==
The civil parish was created in 1894 from the majority of Reedley Hallows, Filly Close and New Laund Booth civil parish. That civil parish had been created in 1866 from the township in the ancient parish of Whalley.

The original boundary with Burnley was Barden Clough, (Note: Barden Clough is the last tributary to enter the River Calder before it is joined by Pendle Water. Most of its course in no longer visible above ground but it passed under Thomas Whitham Sixth Form and followed a footpath along the north-eastern boundary of Burnley General Hospital.) but as town expanded it was moved to the north-west.

Although administratively inside the parish of Whalley, as parts of the former royal hunting Forest of Pendle, the area was extra-parochial until 1887. As part of the Honour of Clitheroe, this meant the parish church for the area was the chapel at Clitheroe Castle.

Reedley Hallows is the eastern side of Pendle Water, while New Laund Booth is to the north-west and Filly Close to the south-west. All 3 are originally documented as enclosures in the forest. In 1324 Filly Close was leased in connection with Royle, across Pendle Water in Burnley. In 1341, Reedley Hallows was a stock-farm for the vaccaries (mediaeval cattle farms) in the rest of Pendle Forest. By 1459 the New Laund (probably originally a deer park) had also been leased to farm.

From 1894 to 1974, Reedley was the administrative centre of the Burnley Rural District. The council offices where located in what is now the Oaks Hotel on Colne Road. There is also a Magistrates' court.

== Notable people ==
- John and Robert Nutter, Catholic martyrs executed for being priests in 1584 and 1600.
- Christopher Towneley, of the Towneley Hall family, lived at Moor Isles Farm in latter years of his life, until 1674.

== Gallery ==
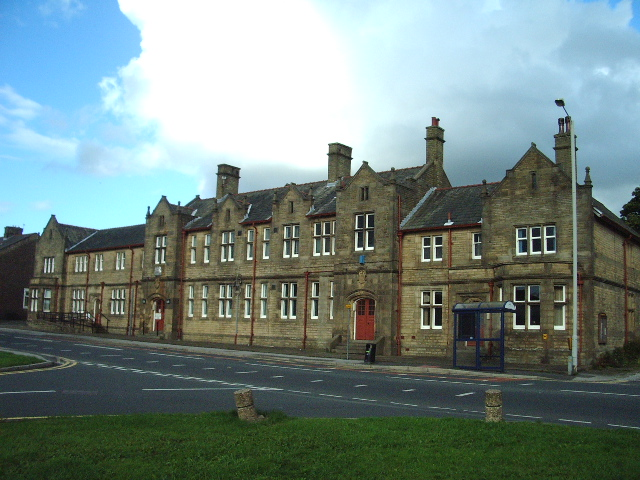
Magistrates' court

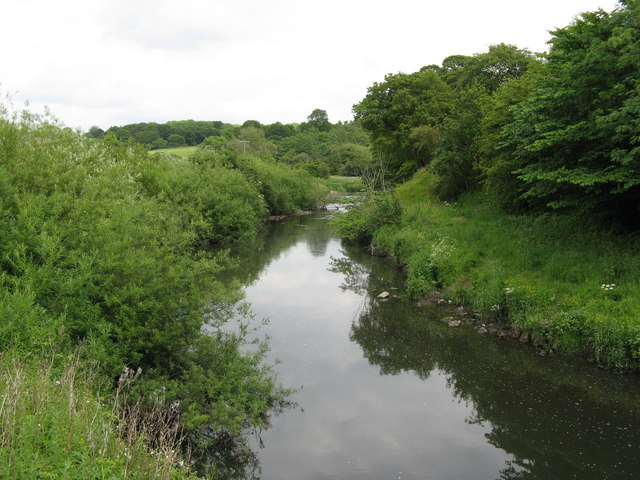
Pendle Water

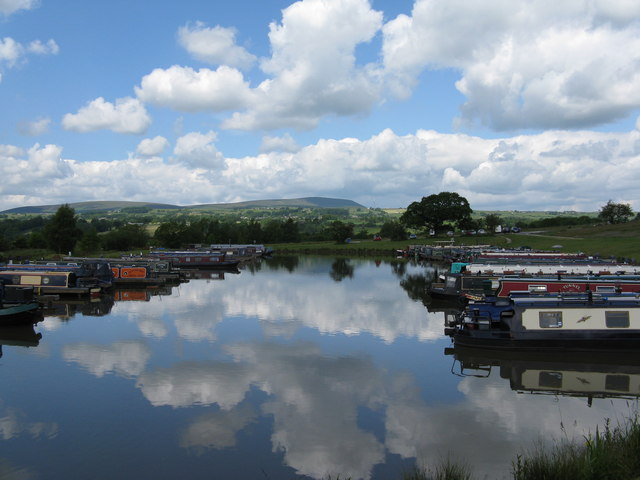
Reedley Marina

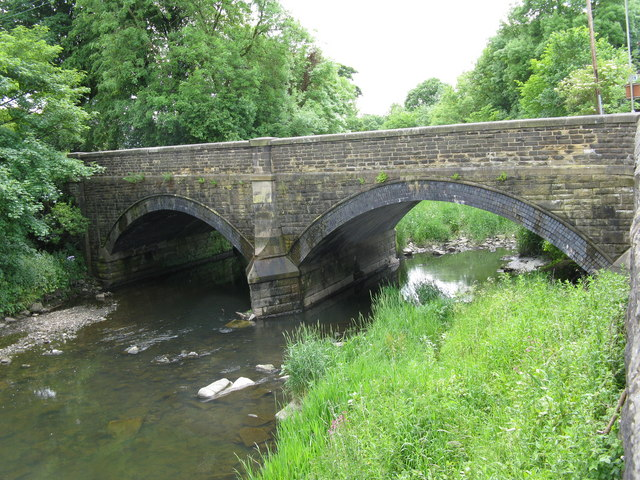
New in Pendle bridge

== See also ==
- Listed buildings in Reedley Hallows
