= Alcohol inhalation =

Method of administering alcohol directly into the respiratory system

Alcohol inhalation is a method of administering alcohol directly into the respiratory system, with aid of a vaporizing or nebulizing device or bag. It is chiefly applied for recreational use, when it is also referred to as alcohol smoking, but it has medical applications for testing on laboratory rats, and treatment of pulmonary edema and viral pneumonia. Depending on the precise definition of 'alcohol', botanical alcohol inhalation can be a subgenre of aromatherapy.

== Methods ==
=== AWOL ===
The practice gained popularity in 2004, with the marketing of a device dubbed AWOL (Alcohol without liquid), a play on the military term AWOL (Absent Without Leave). AWOL, created by British businessman Dominic Simler, was first introduced in Asia and Europe and then in United States in August 2004. AWOL was used by nightclubs, at gatherings and parties, and it garnered attraction as a novelty, as people 'enjoyed passing it around in a group'.

AWOL was gimmicked as an alcohol "vaporizer", implying that it would heat the liquid until it entered a gaseous state, but is in fact a nebulizer, a machine that agitates the liquid into an aerosol. AWOL's official website states that "AWOL and AWOL 1 are powered by Electrical Air Compressors while AWOL 2 and AWOL 3 are powered by electrical oxygen generators", which refer to mechanisms used by the device for facilitating inhalation. Although the AWOL machine is marketed as having no downsides, such as the lack of calories or hangovers, Amanda Shaffer of Slate describes these claims as "dubious at best". Although inhaled alcohol does reduce the caloric content, the savings are minimal.

After expressed safety and health concerns, sale or use of AWOL machines was banned in a number of American states. The AWOL device was later followed by new products for alcohol inhalation, such as "Vaportini", created in 2009, which uses simple thermal vaporization.

=== Bag-in-box wines ===
Some people attempt inhaling alcohol fumes from any container, including emptied bag-in-box wine bags. While these bags may only contain a residual amount of alcohol, inhaling the concentrated fumes can lead to rapid intoxication, even at low volumes. The intoxicating effect may be brief, lasting around a minute. However, the safety has not been scientifically researched so it may be risky.

== Recreational use ==
To inhale alcohol, it must be first converted from liquid into gaseous state (vapor) or aerosol (mist). For recreational use, a variety of methods have been invented. Alcohol can be vaporized by pouring it over dry ice in a narrow container and inhaling with a straw. However, this method must be used with caution due to the large amounts of carbon dioxide released. Another method is to pour alcohol in a corked bottle with a pipe, and then use a bicycle pump to make a spray. Alcohol can be vaporized using a simple container and open-flame heater. Medical devices such as asthma nebulizers and inhalers were also reported as means of application.

== Effects and health concerns ==
There are occupational health and safety risks of inhaling alcohol vapor and mists. Inhalation devices make it "substantially easier to overdose on alcohol" than drinking, because the alcohol bypasses the stomach and liver and goes directly into the bloodstream, and because the user does not have a reliable way of determining how much alcohol they have taken in. Inhaled alcohol cannot be purged from the body by vomiting, which is the body's main protection against alcohol poisoning. Inhaled alcohol can dry out nasal passages and make them more susceptible to infection. There is also a potential increased risk of addiction.

== Medical applications ==
Inhalation of vapor obtained by nebulization of water and ethanol in oxygen has been used in treatment of pulmonary edema in humans. Alcohol vapor acts as an anti-foaming agent in the lungs, so the sputum becomes more liquid, and can be easily expelled. The method has also been used to reduce the alcohol withdrawal syndrome in patients who had intestinal tract surgeries.

== Regulation ==
In the United States, many state legislatures have banned alcohol inhalation machines. Support for such legislation comes from groups fighting underage drinking and drunk driving, including alcohol companies such as Diageo and industry groups such as the Distilled Spirits Council of the United States (DISCUS).

== See also ==
- Alcohol enema
- Alcohol powder – can be inhaled with a nebulizer
- Carbogen – Mixture of carbon dioxide and oxygen
- Nebulizer – Drug delivery device
- Vodka eyeballing
