= Michael Strangelove =

Canadian writer and communications lecturer

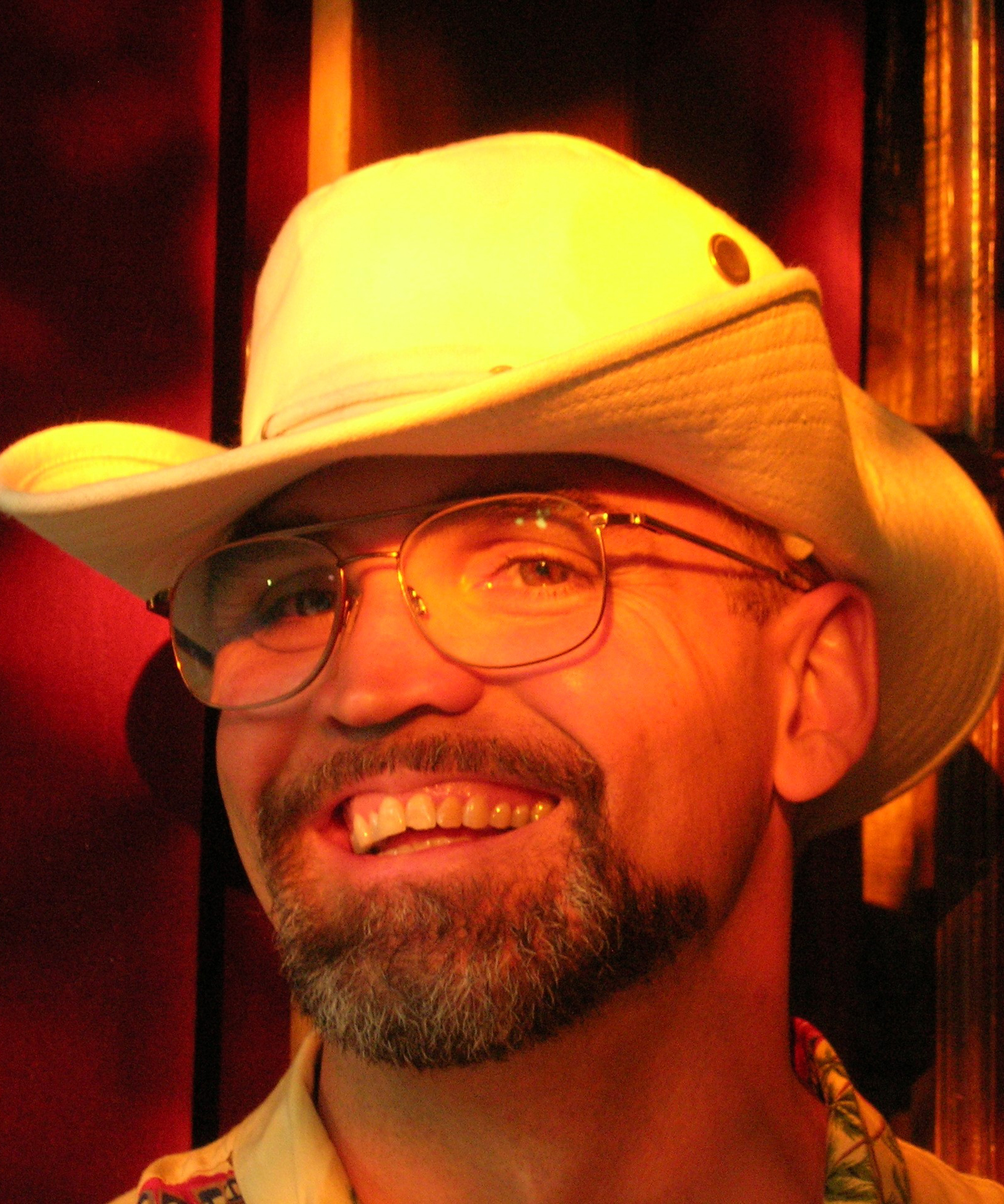
- Strangelove in 2007
- Born: Michael William Strangelove; 1962 (age 63–64); Kingston, Ontario, Canada
- Occupations: Writer, lecturer

Academic background
- Education: University of Ottawa
- Thesis: Redefining the limits to thought within media culture: Collective memory, cyberspace and the subversion of mass media
- Doctoral advisor: Marie-Françoise Guédon

Academic work
- Discipline: Communication
- Institutions: University of Ottawa
- Notable works: Watching YouTube: Extraordinary Videos by Ordinary People; The Empire of Mind: Digital Piracy and the Anti-Capitalist Movement
- Website: strangelove.com

Michael Strangelove (born 1962) is a Canadian writer and academic, currently a lecturer in the Department of Communication at the University of Ottawa. His two most notable works include Watching YouTube: Extraordinary Videos by Ordinary People and The Empire of Mind: Digital Piracy and the Anti-Capitalist Movement, which was nominated for a Governor General's Award for English non-fiction in 2006.

== Books authored ==
- 1991-93 - Directory of Electronic Journals, Newsletters and Academic Discussion Lists, 1, 2, and 3rd Editions (American Association of Research Libraries), coauthored with Diane Kovacs.
- 1994 - How to Advertise on the Internet (Strangelove Press), coauthored with Aneurin Bosley.
- 2005 - The Empire of Mind: Digital Piracy and the Anti-Capitalist Movement (University of Toronto Press).
- 2010 - Watching YouTube: Extraordinary Videos by Ordinary People (University of Toronto Press).
- 2015 - Post-TV: Piracy, Cord-Cutting, and the Future of Television (University of Toronto Press).
