= Francis E. Anstie =

English doctor, medical author, and journalist

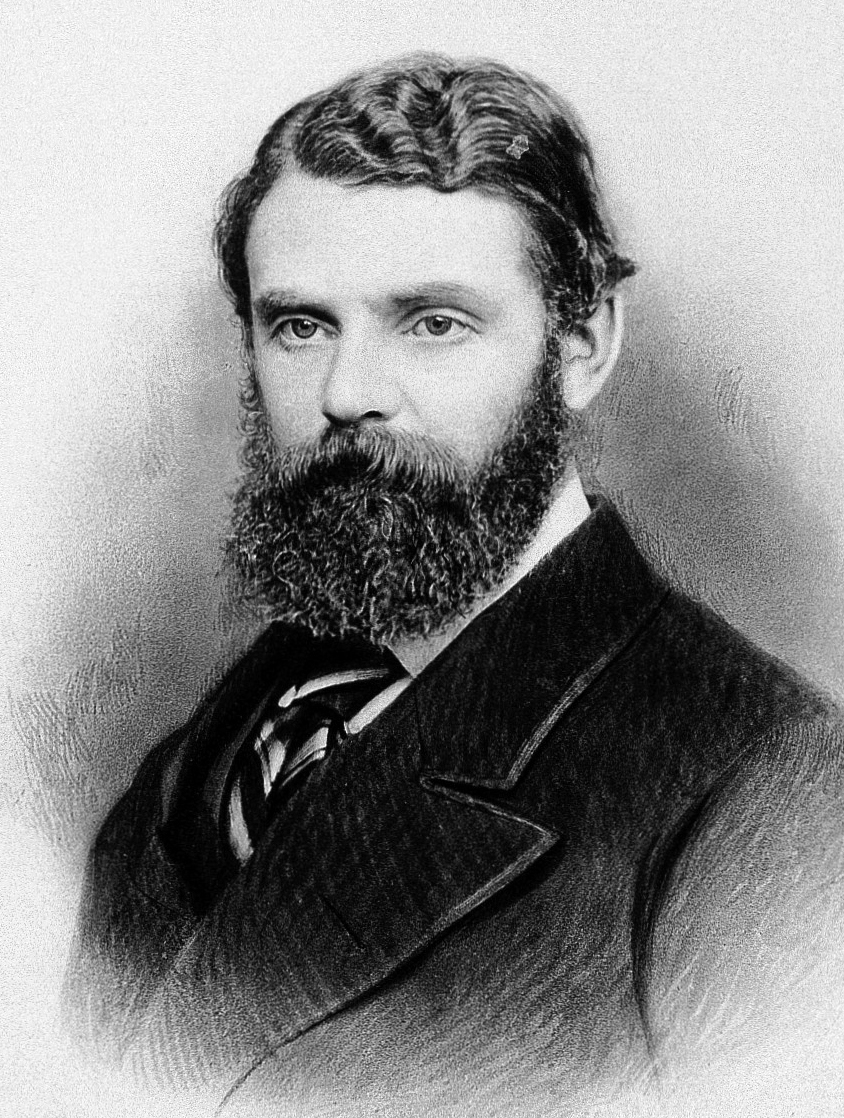
Francis E. Anstie

Francis Edmund Anstie (11 December 1833 – 12 September 1874) was an English doctor, medical author and journalist. He was the first editor of medical journal The Practitioner, established in 1868. He is notable for proposing Anstie's limit, an amount of alcohol that could be consumed daily with no ill effects.

== Biography ==
Anstie was born at Devizes, Wiltshire on 11 December 1833, the son of Paul Anstie, a manufacturer belonging to a family long notable for their attachment to liberal principles. He was educated at a private school till the age of sixteen, when he was apprenticed to his cousin, Thomas Anstie, a medical practitioner, with whom he remained three years. In 1853 he entered the medical department of King's College London, where his teachers were Sir William Fergusson, and especially Dr. R. B. Todd, whose doctrines and practice produced a permanent impression upon Anstie's mind. He became M.R.C.S. and L.S.A. in 1856, was M.B. London in 1857, MD 1859. He was admitted a member of the College of Physicians in 1859, fellow 1865. In 1860 he was elected assistant physician to the Westminster Hospital, but did not become full physician till 1873. He was lecturer at that school, first on forensic medicine, afterwards for many years on materia medica, and for a short time on medicine. In 1862 Anstie married a daughter of Mr. Wass of Cromford, Derbyshire, whom he left a widow with a son and two daughters.

On his first entrance into professional life Anstie was occupied in administering chloroform for the operations of Sir William Fergusson; but he soon went into practice as a physician, and became very fully occupied in hospital work and in journalism, being for some years a member of the editorial staff of The Lancet; while in the last few years of his life he was beginning to get a good consulting practice. Dr. Anstie's life was cut short by an illness contracted in the course of a sanitary inspection. Some strange cases of fatal disease having occurred in the schools of the Patriotic Fund at Wandsworth, Anstie was called in to make an inspection of the buildings and investigate the causes of the epidemic. In making a post-mortem examination he received a slight wound, from the effects of which he died on 12 September 1874.

=== Therapeutics ===
Dr. Anstie was a skilful physician, an eager investigator, and a vigorous writer. Literary work connected with medicine, in addition to regular journalism, occupied much of his energy during his whole professional life. His activity was mainly directed in three lines—in the advancement of therapeutics, in questions of public health, and in the study of nervous diseases. In therapeutics he began with investigating the action of alcohol on the body in health and disease; and in this he was a pupil of Dr. R. B. Todd, one of whose leading principles was the use of stimulants in medicine. After writing scientific and popular papers on the subject (in the London Medical Review, 1862, and the Cornhill Magazine respectively), Anstie brought out in 1864 his important work on Stimulants and Narcotics, containing the result of experiments, observations, and literary research, and these subjects continued to occupy his attention till the last year of his life.

=== Journalism ===
In 1868 he became joint-editor (and in the next year sole editor) of The Practitioner, a new journal intended to advance the scientific study of therapeutics. The special character and importance of this journal, which – according to Anstie's Dictionary of National Biography (DNB) entry – has done much to invigorate the study of therapeutics in the UK, were of Anstie's creation.

=== Public health ===
In questions of public health Anstie was warmly interested; and he took an important part in initiating two important public reforms. In 1864 certain scandals connected with the administration of the poor-law infirmaries attracted public attention, and induced the proprietors of The Lancet to appoint a commission, consisting of Dr. Anstie, Mr. Ernest Hart, and Dr. Carr, to report on the subject. Anstie took the largest part in examining the London infirmaries, and wrote the report which appeared in The Lancet 1 July 1865. Others followed, and one on the state of Farnham workhouse, published in 1867, led to an inquiry by the Poor Law Board, which justified the report of The Lancet commissioners. These inquiries may be regarded as the starting-point of the movement of reform of poor-law medical relief. In 1874 Anstie brought before the College of Physicians a motion that the college should petition the prime minister to provide some remedy for the injurious overcrowding of the poor in London, which the introduction of certain railways and improvements had lately aggravated. The petition, being adopted and sent in, was largely influential in inducing the then Home Secretary, Mr. Cross, to bring in a bill in parliament which became law as an Act for facilitating the Improvement of the Dwellings of the Working Classes in large Towns. In this momentous question, Anstie deserves honourable mention as a pioneer.

=== Nervous system ===
On diseases of the nervous system Anstie wrote several memoirs, and finally in 1871 a book on Neuralgia and the Diseases which resemble it. He also contributed an article on the same subject to Sir John Russell Reynolds's System of Medicine. The views which he expounded in both works were to a large extent original, and doubtless open to criticism; but many of his observations are of permanent value. In 1867 he gave two lectures at the College of Physicians on the sphygmograph, a mechanical device used to measure blood pressure.

The completeness of his scientific work was, according to the DNB, much interfered with by his multifarious occupations and the ceaseless literary activity which circumstances imposed upon him. Though finding little time for elaborate research, he was a zealous advocate of new and more accurate methods, and did much not only to make known the results of investigation, but to stimulate and sustain the scientific movement in medicine.

=== Anstie's limit ===
Anstie's limit is an amount of alcohol that Anstie proposed could be consumed daily with no ill effects. It is 1.5 ounces of pure ethanol, equivalent to two and one-half US standard drinks.

=== Reputation ===
At the time of his death Anstie's reputation was rapidly growing, and was as great in the United States of America as it was at home. Offers were made to induce him to accept a professorship and hospital appointment in that country, but family reasons, among others, induced him to decline. In 1874 he took part in the foundation of the Medical School for Women, and acted with great energy as the first dean of the school.

=== Publications ===
Besides the works mentioned above, he wrote a very large number of papers and articles, some signed, some anonymous. Among the former were:

- Anstie, Francis E. Is it food, medicine, or poison. Cornhill Magazine, 1862, 5, 707–716.
- Anstie, Francis E. Does alcohol act as a food? Cornhill Magazine. 1862, 6, 319–329.
- Notes on Epidemics, for the use of the Public, 1866. Several medical papers in the Practitioner.
- Articles in Reynolds's System of Medicine, vol. ii. 1868: Alcoholism, Neuralgia, and Hypochondriasis — the latter jointly with Sir William Gull
- Reynolds's System of Medicine, vol. iii. 1871: Pleurisy, Pleurodynia, Hydrothorax, Pneumothorax, and Hepatalgia.
- On the Hereditary Connection between certain Nervous Diseases (Journal of Mental Science, Jan. 1872).
- Lectures on Diseases of the Nervous System (The Lancet, 1872–73).

== Sources ==
- This article incorporates text from a publication now in the public domain: "Anstie, Francis Edmund". Dictionary of National Biography. London: Smith, Elder & Co. 1885–1900.
