= 2021 Pendle Borough Council election =

2021 UK local government election

The 2021 Pendle Borough Council election took place on 6 May 2021 to elect all members of Pendle Borough Council in England. This was on the same day as other English local elections. All 33 seats across 12 wards were up for election due to boundary changes.

The elections resulted in the Conservatives gaining overall control.

== Results summary ==
Party	Leader	Councillors			Votes	
Party	Leader		Of total			Of total
Conservative Party	Nadeem Ahmed	18	54.5%	18 / 33	34,129	48.22%
Labour Party	Mohammed Iqbal	10	30.3%	10 / 33	23,259	30.30%
Liberal Democrats	David Whipp	5	15.2%	5 / 33	12,710	17.96%
Independent		0	0.0%	0 / 33	500	0.70%
Green Party of England and Wales		0	0.0%	0 / 33	130	0.19%
No Label		0	0.0%	0 / 33	49	0.07%

== Council composition ==
Following the last election in 2017, the composition of the 48-seat council was:

↓
21	16	10	1
Conservative	Labour	Lib Dem	I

After the election, the composition of the 33-seat council was:

↓
18	10	5
Conservative	Labour	Lib Dem

I - Independent

== Ward results ==
Incumbent councillors are denoted by an asterisk (*). Sources -

=== Barnoldswick ===
Barnoldswick (3 seats)
Party	Candidate	Votes	%	±%
Liberal Democrats	Tom Whipp*	1,138	50.8	
Conservative	Jennifer Purcell*	999	44.6	
Liberal Democrats	Marjorie Adams*	980	43.7	
Conservative	Harry Purcell	856	38.2	
Liberal Democrats	Jayne Margaret Mills*	838	37.4	
Conservative	Carole Goulthorp	699	31.2	
Labour	Euan Coulston	343	15.3	
Turnout		2,241	33.44	
Liberal Democrats win (new seat)				
Conservative win (new seat)				
Liberal Democrats win (new seat)				

=== Barrowford and Pendleside ===
Barrowford and Pendleside (3 seats)
Party	Candidate	Votes	%	±%
Conservative	Linda Crossley*	1,668	65.4	
Conservative	Carlo Lionti*	1,516	59.5	
Conservative	Nadeem Ahmed*	1,173	46.0	
Labour	Susan Frances Nike	615	24.1	
Independent	Ken Turner*	500	19.6	
Labour	Robert Andrew Oliver	462	18.1	
Labour	Patricia Josephine Hannah-Wood	409	16.0	
Liberal Democrats	Philip Alfred Berry	178	7.0	
Liberal Democrats	Joanna Mary Roach	130	5.1	
Liberal Democrats	Kevin Joseph Vickers	96	3.8	
Turnout		2,550	42.43	
Conservative win (new seat)				
Conservative win (new seat)				
Conservative win (new seat)				

=== Boulsworth and Foulridge ===
Boulsworth and Foulridge (3 seats)
Party	Candidate	Votes	%	±%
Conservative	Sarah Cockburn-Price*	1,498	63.4	
Conservative	David Cockburn-Price	1,362	57.6	
Conservative	Neil Butterworth*	1,329	56.2	
Liberal Democrats	Andrew John Latham MacDonald	606	25.6	
Liberal Democrats	Ed Cox	557	23.6	
Liberal Democrats	Graham Roach	468	19.8	
Labour Co-op	Sheila Wicks*	365	15.4	
Turnout		2,364	37.54	
Conservative win (new seat)				
Conservative win (new seat)				
Conservative win (new seat)				

=== Bradley ===
Bradley
Party	Candidate	Votes	%	±%
Labour	Mohammed Iqbal*	1,665	50.3	
Conservative	Mohammad Aslam*	1,625	49.0	
Labour	Mohammad Sakib*	1,416	42.7	
Conservative	Mohammad Kaleem	1,381	41.7	
Conservative	Hassan Mahmood	1,375	41.5	
Labour	Sadaf Khan	1,307	39.5	
Liberal Democrats	David Robert Clamp	205	6.2	
Liberal Democrats	Jodie Marie Hoyle	201	6.1	
Turnout		3,313	52.58	
Labour win (new seat)				
Conservative win (new seat)				
Labour win (new seat)				

=== Brierfield East and Clover Hill ===
Brierfield East and Clover Hill (3 seats)
Party	Candidate	Votes	%	±%
Labour	Naeem Hussain Ashraf*	1,581	54.7	
Labour	Zafar Ali*	1,389	48.1	
Labour	Eileen Ansar*	1,381	47.8	
Conservative	Martyn Stone	1,122	38.8	
Conservative	Mohammed Khan	1,060	36.7	
Conservative	Shozab Munir	786	27.2	
Liberal Democrats	Doris June Haigh	266	9.2	
Turnout		2,889	45.66	
Labour win (new seat)				
Labour win (new seat)				
Labour win (new seat)				

=== Brierfield West and Reedley ===
Brierfield West and Reedley (2 seats)
Party	Candidate	Votes	%	±%
Labour	Mohammad Hanif*	1,562	66.2	
Labour	Yasser Iqbal*	1,417	60.1	
Conservative	Pauline Anne McCormick	682	28.9	
Conservative	Sajjad Akbar	513	21.8	
Liberal Democrats	Kane Tudor Land	150	6.4	
Turnout		2,358	52.91	
Labour win (new seat)				
Labour win (new seat)				

=== Earby and Coates ===
Earby and Coates (3 seats)
Party	Candidate	Votes	%	±%
Conservative	Rosemary Carroll*	1,166	48.0	
Conservative	Mike Goulthorp*	1,111	45.7	
Liberal Democrats	David Michael Baxter Whipp*	1,085	44.6	
Conservative	Colin Carter*	1,043	42.9	
Liberal Democrats	Susan Lynne Land	794	32.7	
Liberal Democrats	Kenneth Hartley*	764	31.4	
Labour	Robert French	351	14.4	
Turnout		2,431	36.98	
Conservative win (new seat)				
Conservative win (new seat)				
Liberal Democrats win (new seat)				

=== Fence and Higham ===
Fence and Higham (1 seat)
Party	Candidate	Votes	%	±%
Liberal Democrats	Brian Newman*	510	51.5	
Conservative	Christopher Howard Hartley	480	48.5	
Majority		30	3.0	
Turnout		990	50.89	
Liberal Democrats win (new seat)				

=== Marsden and Southfield ===
Marsden and Southfield (3 seats)
Party	Candidate	Votes	%	±%
Conservative	Mohammed Adnan	1,257	51.7	
Conservative	Neil McGowan*	1,185	48.7	
Conservative	Karen Howarth	1,170	48.1	
Labour	Mohammad Ammer*	885	36.4	
Labour	Mohammad Kamran Latif	849	34.9	
Labour	Yvonne Marion Tennant*	785	32.3	
Liberal Democrats	Keith Ian Thornton	120	4.9	
Liberal Democrats	David Hugh Foster	119	4.9	
Liberal Democrats	Chris Church	112	4.6	
Turnout		2,431	39.84	
Conservative win (new seat)				
Conservative win (new seat)				
Conservative win (new seat)				

=== Vivary Bridge ===
Vivary Bridge (3 seats)
Party	Candidate	Votes	%	±%
Conservative	David Albin	744	48.6	
Conservative	Donna Lockwood	743	48.6	
Conservative	Kieran McGladdery	730	47.7	
Liberal Democrats	David Clegg*	499	32.6	
Liberal Democrats	Mary Elizabeth Thomas	403	26.3	
Liberal Democrats	Howard Philip Thomas	359	23.5	
Labour Co-op	David Kenneth Foat	276	18.0	
Labour Co-op	Ann Marie Wrigley	269	17.6	
Turnout		1,530	28.16	
Conservative win (new seat)				
Conservative win (new seat)				
Conservative win (new seat)				

=== Waterside and Horsfield ===
Waterside and Horsfield (3 seats)
Party	Candidate	Votes	%	±%
Conservative	Ash Sutcliffe	813	46.2	
Liberal Democrats	Dorothy Elizabeth Lord*	780	44.3	
Conservative	Darren Harrison	687	39.0	
Conservative	Jonathan Andrew Nixon*	672	38.2	
Liberal Democrats	Alice Rosemary Mann*	661	37.5	
Liberal Democrats	Bryan Wildman	525	29.8	
Labour	Manzar Iqbal	319	18.1	
No Label	Craig Ian McBeth	49	2.8	
Turnout		1,761	31.31	
Conservative win (new seat)				
Liberal Democrats win (new seat)				
Conservative win (new seat)				

=== Whitefield and Walverden ===
Whitefield and Walverden (3 seats)
Party	Candidate	Votes	%	±%
Labour	Asjad Mahmood*	1,951	62.5	
Labour	Faraz Ahmad	1,862	59.6	
Labour	Thabasum Ruby Anwar	1,800	57.6	
Conservative	Mukhtar Ahmed	965	30.9	
Conservative	Asad Mehmood	929	29.7	
Conservative	Irfan Ayub	790	25.3	
Liberal Democrats	Patricia Therese Howarth	166	5.3	
Green	Annette Irene Marti	130	4.2	
Turnout		3,123	47.91	
Labour win (new seat)				
Labour win (new seat)				
Labour win (new seat)				
