= Clover Hill =

Clover Hill or Clover Hill Historic District may refer to:

== United Kingdom ==
- Clover Hill (ward), an electoral ward of the Pendle Borough Council, Lancashire, England
- Clover Hill, Kettering, an electoral ward of the Northamptonshire County Council, England

== United States ==
- Clover Hill (Louisville, Kentucky), listed on the National Register of Historic Places (NRHP) in Kentucky
- Clover Hill, Maryland, a census-designated place
- Clover Hill (Brookeville, Maryland), listed on the NRHP
- Cloverhill, New Jersey
- Clover Hill (Patterson, North Carolina), listed on the NRHP
- Clover Hill Mill, Maryville, Tennessee, listed on the NRHP
- Clover Hill, Appomattox County, Virginia, a historic town later renamed Appomattox Court House
- Clover Hill, Chesterfield County, Virginia
  - Clover Hill Railroad
  - Clover Hill High School
- Clover Hill (Culpeper, Virginia), a historic plantation house
- Clover Hill (restaurant), a Michelin-starred restaurant in Brooklyn, New York

== See also ==
- Cloverhill (disambiguation)
