= Brierfield =

Brierfield may refer to:

- Brierfield, New South Wales, in Bellingen Shire, Australia

== United Kingdom ==
- Brierfield, Lancashire
  - Brierfield railway station
  - Brierfield (ward)
  - Brierfield Swifts F.C.

== United States ==
- Brierfield, Alabama
- Brierfield Plantation, Mississippi
