= St Mary's Church, Nelson =

Mosque in Nelson, Lancashire, England

St. Mary’s Church
- St. Mary’s Church, Nelson
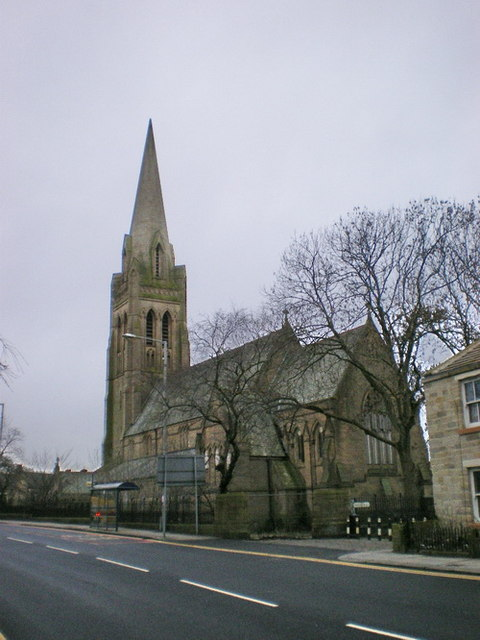
- The former St. Mary's Church seen from Manchester Road
- St. Mary’s Church
- 53.8344°N 2.2202°W
- OS grid reference: SD 85607 37595
- Location: Nelson, Pendle
- Country: England
- Denomination: Anglican

History
- Status: Former parish church

Architecture
- Functional status: Redundant
- Heritage designation: Grade II
- Architect: Waddington and Dunkerley
- Style: Gothic revival
- Completed: 1879
- Closed: 1989

St Mary's Church is on Manchester Road in Nelson, Pendle, Lancashire. It is a redundant Anglican parish church, and is recorded in the National Heritage List for England as a designated Grade II listed building. It was built in 1879 to a design by Waddington and Dunkerley. The west bay and tower were added between 1905 and 1908. The Ecroyd family provided a large amount of the funding with the rest being raised by public subscription. The chapelry district of Saint Mary, Nelson in Little Marsden, a division of the new parish of Little Marsden, was assigned in August 1879.

In 1989 the church was declared redundant due to decline in congregation and attendance. Its benefice has been united with that of St Paul's Church, Nelson and the former Church of St Bede to create the parish of Nelson Little Marsden. After 1989, the former Church Hall on Maurice Street was converted into a shared space for both Church and secular organisations. Today it is known as the Beacon Centre, with a chapel in an upper room containing the altar moved from the original church.

The church building was bought by a private developer who was refused permission to demolish the building. After being left empty for over two decades, it was acquired by the Heritage Trust for the North West. £250,000 structural repairs were undertaken, funded by the trust and with substantial support from English Heritage, Pendle Borough Council, and the Architectural Heritage Fund. It was used as the base of the Open Door Furniture Recycling organisation.

Open Door later moved elsewhere, leaving the church again vacant. In 2026 an illegal cannabis grow was discovered in the building.

== See also ==
- Listed buildings in Nelson, Lancashire
