= Cloverhill =

Cloverhill may refer to:

- Cloverhill, New Jersey, unincorporated community in the United States
- Cloverhill Prison, Dublin, Ireland
- Cloverhill Bakery, former company in the United States

== See also ==
- Clover Hill
