= Coates (ward) =

Former electoral ward in Lancashire, England

Coordinates: 53.9230°N 2.1783°W

- Shown within Pendle

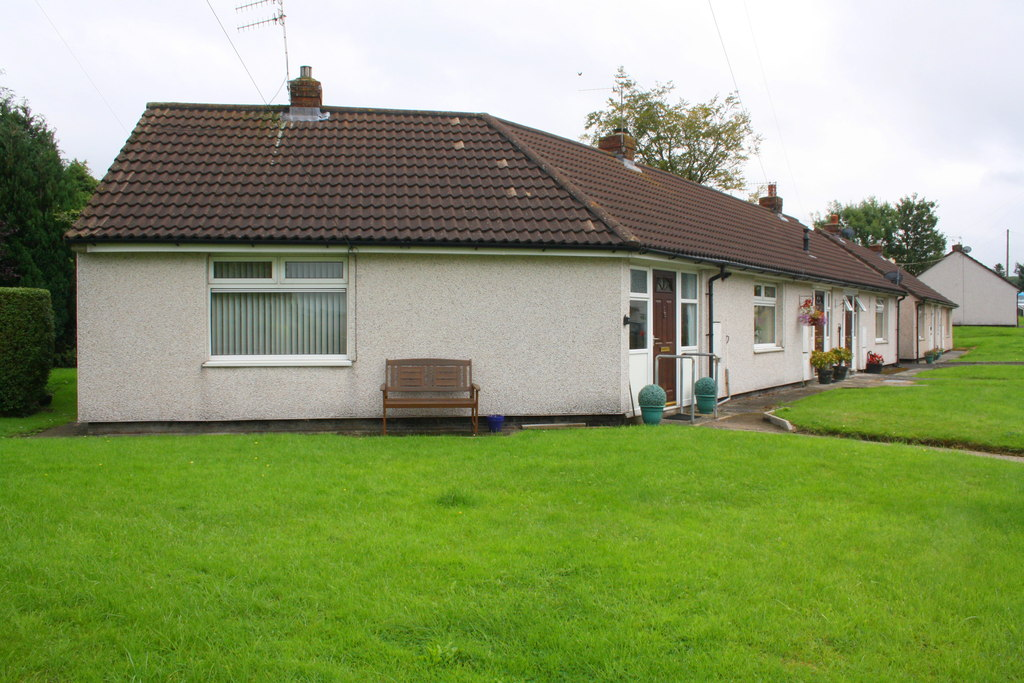

- Location within Lancashire
- Area: 4.12 km^{2} (1.59 sq mi)
- Population: 5,445 (2011)
  - Density: 1,322/km^{2} (3,420/sq mi)
- Civil parish: Barnoldswick
- District: Pendle
- Ceremonial county: Lancashire
- Region: North West
- Country: England
- Sovereign state: United Kingdom
- UK Parliament: Pendle and Clitheroe
- Councillors: Marjorie Adams (Liberal Democrats); Lindsay Gaskell (Liberal Democrats); Janine Throupe (Liberal Democrats)

Coates was one of the 20 electoral wards that formed the Parliamentary constituency of Pendle, Lancashire, England. The ward returned three councillors to represent the northern half of Barnoldswick on Pendle Borough Council. The incumbent councillors were Marjorie Adams, Lindsay Gaskell and Janine Throupe, all Liberal Democrats. As of the May 2011 Council election, Coates had an electorate of 4,166. In 2020 the ward was abolished.

== Civil parish ==
Coates was formerly a township in the parish of Barnoldswick, in 1866 Coates became a separate civil parish, on 1 October 1923 the parish was abolished and merged with Barnoldswick. In 1921 the parish had a population of 392. In 1974 it was moved from the West Riding of Yorkshire to Lancashire.
