= Brierfield (ward) =

- Shown within Pendle
- Area: 1.85 km^{2} (0.71 sq mi)
- Population: 4,862 (2011)
  - Density: 2,628/km^{2} (6,810/sq mi)
- District: Pendle
- Ceremonial county: Lancashire
- Region: North West
- Country: England
- Sovereign state: United Kingdom
- UK Parliament: Burnley
- Councillors: Nawaz Ahmed (Labour); Mohammed Arshad (Labour); Naeem Ashraf (Labour)

Brierfield is one of the 20 electoral wards that form the Parliamentary constituency of Pendle, Lancashire, England. The ward returns three councillors, currently all Labour, to represent the small town of Brierfield on Pendle Borough Council. As of the May 2011 Council election, Brierfield had an electorate of 3,752.

== Demographics ==
Over 30 per cent of the population of Brierfield is aged 19 or under, hence the ward has a slightly lower-than-average age (mean 36.9 years). There is a large minority population in Brierfield, with 35.2 per cent of residents being of Asian (mostly Pakistani) origin.

== Crime ==
The ward has considerably higher crime rates than both the local and national averages, with 112 felonies per 1000 of the population. Home burglaries and vehicle crimes are twice as common in Brierfield compared to the average for Lancashire.

== Election results ==
Year elected	Councillor	Majority	%
2008	Naeem Ashraf (Labour)	231	12.6
2010	Mohammed Arshad (Labour)	393	14.6
2011	Nawaz Ahmed (Labour)	511	28.2
