= Barrowford (ward) =

- Shown within Pendle
- Area: 4.10 km^{2} (1.58 sq mi)
- Population: 5,043 (2011)
  - Density: 1,230/km^{2} (3,200/sq mi)
- District: Pendle
- Ceremonial county: Lancashire
- Region: North West
- Country: England
- Sovereign state: United Kingdom
- UK Parliament: Pendle and Clitheroe
- Councillors: Anthony Beckett (Conservative); Linda Crossley (Conservative); Jonathan Eyre (Conservative)

Barrowford is one of the 20 electoral wards that form the Parliamentary constituency of Pendle, Lancashire, England. The ward returns three councillors, currently all Conservatives, to represent the village of Barrowford on Pendle Borough Council. As of the May 2011 Council election, Barrowford had an electorate of 4,070.

== Demographics ==
Barrowford has an older-than-average population compared to both Pendle and England, with 23.4 per cent of residents aged 60 or over. It also has a considerably higher proportion of white residents than the local average.

== Election results ==
Year elected	Councillor	Majority	%
2008	Anthony Beckett (Conservative)	725	43.0
2010	Jonathan Eyre	653	23.1
2011	Linda Crossley	282	15.6
