= Clover Hill (ward) =

Electoral ward in Lancashire, England

- Shown within Pendle
- Area: 1.34 km^{2} (0.52 sq mi)
- Population: 5,381 (2011)
  - Density: 4,016/km^{2} (10,400/sq mi)
- District: Pendle
- Ceremonial county: Lancashire
- Region: North West
- Country: England
- Sovereign state: United Kingdom
- UK Parliament: Burnley
- Councillors: Eileen Ansar (Labour); Kathleen Shore (Labour); Wayne Blackburn (Labour)

Clover Hill is one of the 20 electoral wards that form the Parliamentary constituency of Pendle, Lancashire, England. The ward returns three councillors to represent the Clover Hill area of Nelson on Pendle Borough Council. The incumbent councillors are Eileen Ansar, Kathleen Shore and Wayne Blackburn, all of the Labour Party. As of the May 2011 Council election, Clover Hill had an electorate of 3,782.
