= Duncan Spencer =

English cricketer

Personal information
- Full name: Duncan John Spencer
- Born: 5 April 1972 (age 54); Nelson, Lancashire, England
- Height: 172 cm (5 ft 8 in)
- Batting: Right-handed
- Bowling: Right-arm fast
- Role: All rounder

Domestic team information
- Years: Team
- 1993–1994: Kent
- 1994/95–2000/01: Western Australia
- 2006: Sussex
- 2006: Buckinghamshire

Career statistics
Competition	First-class	List A
Matches	16	20
Runs scored	233	79
Batting average	14.56	9.87
100s/50s	0/1	0/0
Top score	75	17*
Balls bowled	2,094	843
Wickets	36	23
Bowling average	39.22	29.56
5 wickets in innings	0	0
10 wickets in match	0	0
Best bowling	4/31	4/35
Catches/stumpings	10/–	5/–
- Source: CricInfo, 24 June 2022

Duncan Spencer (born 5 April 1972) is an English former cricketer.

== Career ==
Born in Nelson, Lancashire, the family moved to Perth in Western Australia when he was five years old and Spencer played Western Australian grade cricket. He played as a right-handed batsman and a right-arm fast bowler. After playing aged group cricket for Western Australia in 1989, Spencer's first high-profile cricket appearances came in two one-day matches for Western Australia against a touring England A team in March 1994.

Spencer's List A and first-class cricket debuts came for Kent County Cricket Club in 1993. He made five List A and two first-class appearances for the team during the season before signing for Western Australia in time for the 1994–95 Sheffield Shield. After playing in the majority of the team's matches during the Shield season, in 1994 he returned to Kent, playing a further four County Championship matches and in the county's List A team. Spencer dropped out of the county game with back trouble, but not before Sir Vivian Richards rated Spencer as the fastest bowler he had ever faced.

After six years out of the Western Australian team, he returned to play six one-day matches for WA in the 2000/01 season and after the last of these matches, he returned a positive drug test for the anabolic steroid performance-enhancing drug nandrolone. He was found guilty and suspended from all competitive cricket for 18 months. Spencer claimed that it was taken to relieve the pain caused by chronic back injuries.

Spencer returned to sign for Sussex at the age of 34, signing for the start of the 2006 County Championship season. He played just one Championship match following his return, moving to Minor Counties team Buckinghamshire during the second half of the season. He was on the losing team of the 2006 Minor Counties Championship final.
