= Nelson, Lancashire =

Town in Lancashire, England

Coordinates: 53.8346°N 2.2180°W

Nelson
- Town and civil parish
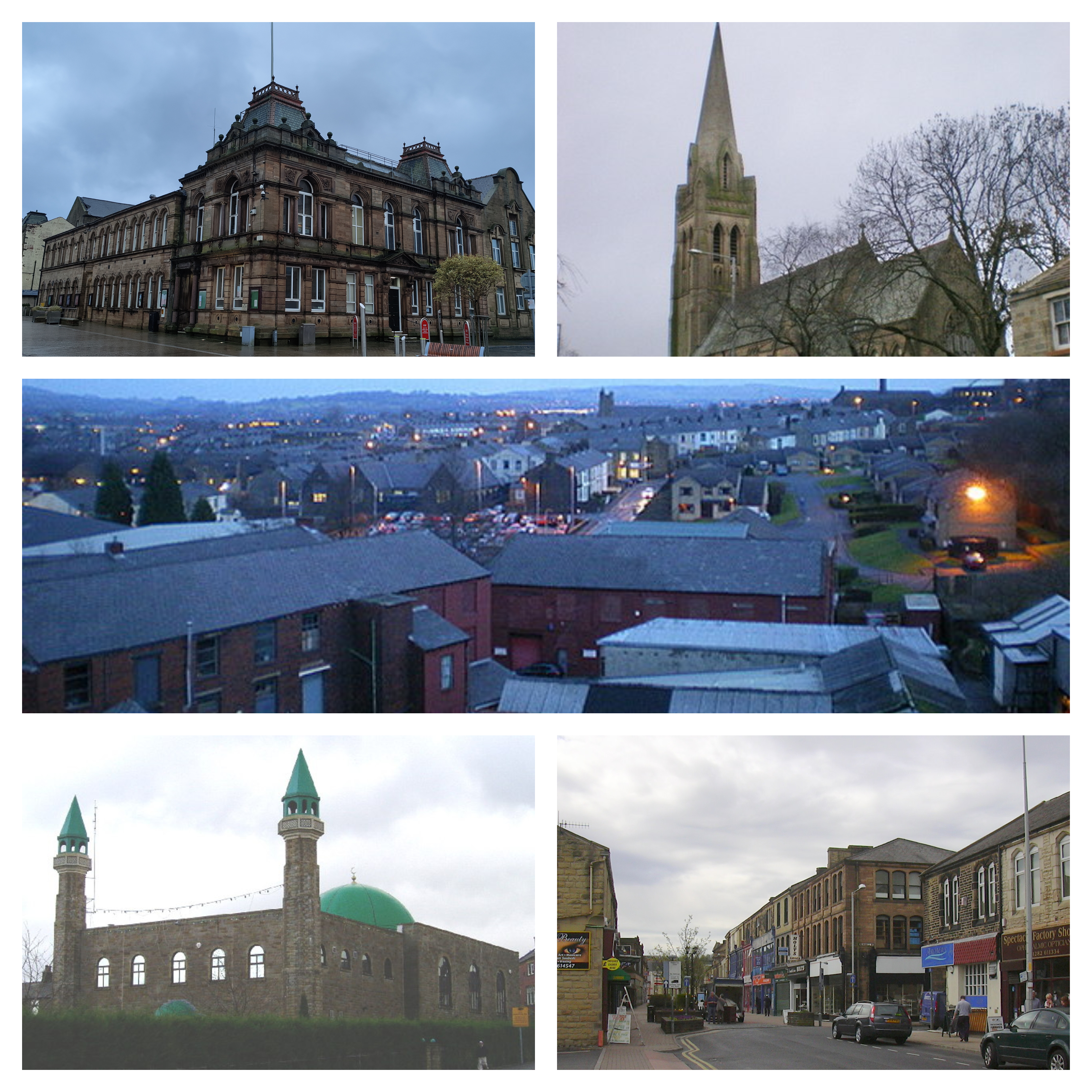
- Clockwise from top left: Nelson Town Hall; St Mary's Church; Skyline of Nelson; Nelson Central Mosque; Scotland Road

- Shown within Pendle Borough Location within Lancashire
- Area: 4.64 km^{2} (1.79 sq mi)
- Population: 33,617
  - Density: 18,780/sq mi (7,250/km^{2})
- OS grid reference: SD856376
  - London: 182.74 miles (294 km) SSE
- Civil parish: Nelson
- District: Pendle
- Shire county: Lancashire
- Region: North West
- Country: England
- Sovereign state: United Kingdom
- Post town: NELSON
- Postcode district: BB9
- Dialling code: 01282
- Police: Lancashire
- Fire: Lancashire
- Ambulance: North West
- UK Parliament: Pendle and Clitheroe
- Website: Pendle Borough Council

Nelson is a town and civil parish in the Borough of Pendle in Lancashire, England, it had a population of 33,617 in 2021. Nelson is 3 miles (5 km) north of Burnley and 2 miles (3 km) south-west of Colne. Nelson developed as a mill town during the Industrial Revolution.

== History ==
An Iron Age hillfort called Castercliff is on a hill to the east of the town. The modern town spans the two parts of the township of Marsden in the ancient parish of Whalley. Little Marsden was on the south-west of Walverden Water, its lands considered part of the manor of Ightenhill and Great Marsden to the north-east, part of the manor of Colne. Great Marsden included the southern parts of Colne, (Note: Colne Water formed the border between Great Marsden and Colne townships.) and Little Marsden included all of modern-day Brierfield.

Walverden Water joins Pendle Water next to Nelson & Colne College, with that river forming the boundary of the Forest of Pendle. Both the manors and forest were parts of the Honour of Clitheroe. The lord of Clitheroe had a mill on the river in 1311, thought to have been sited near the confluence with Clough Head Beck, where Scholefield Mill now stands. There is also evidence of an ancient fulling mill further upstream. A small chapel is thought to have been built during the reign of Henry VIII on the site of St Paul's Church.

The forest of Pendle was made famous by the Pendle witch trials of 1612. One of the accused in the less well-known witch trials of 1634, Margaret Johnson, confessed that she first met her familiar in Marsden.

A small mill had been established by the Ecroyd family at Edge End as early as 1740, and they started Lomeshaye Mill as a water-powered spinning mill in 1780. The coming of the Leeds and Liverpool Canal in 1796, followed by the East Lancashire Railway Line in 1849, spurred its development as an industrial town, with an economy based mainly upon cotton weaving. The first Ordnance Survey map of the area, published in 1848, shows three small villages: Marsden (around St Paul's), and Hebson and Bradley, both on Walverden Water in the modern-day centre of town. Also apparent are the estates of Marsden Hall to the east and Carr Hall across Pendle Water to the north-west, as well as the turnpike roads of the Marsden, Gisburn and Long Preston trust (Scotland Road) heading north, and the Blackburn, Addingham and Cocking End trust (Manchester Road) heading east.

Brierfield railway station was originally called Marsden, and Nelson railway station was known as the Nelson Inn station, Great Marsden, after the adjacent public house, the Lord Nelson Inn (named after Admiral Lord Nelson). As the villages developed into a town, the name Nelson was chosen to differentiate it from Marsden across the Pennines in the neighbouring West Riding of Yorkshire.

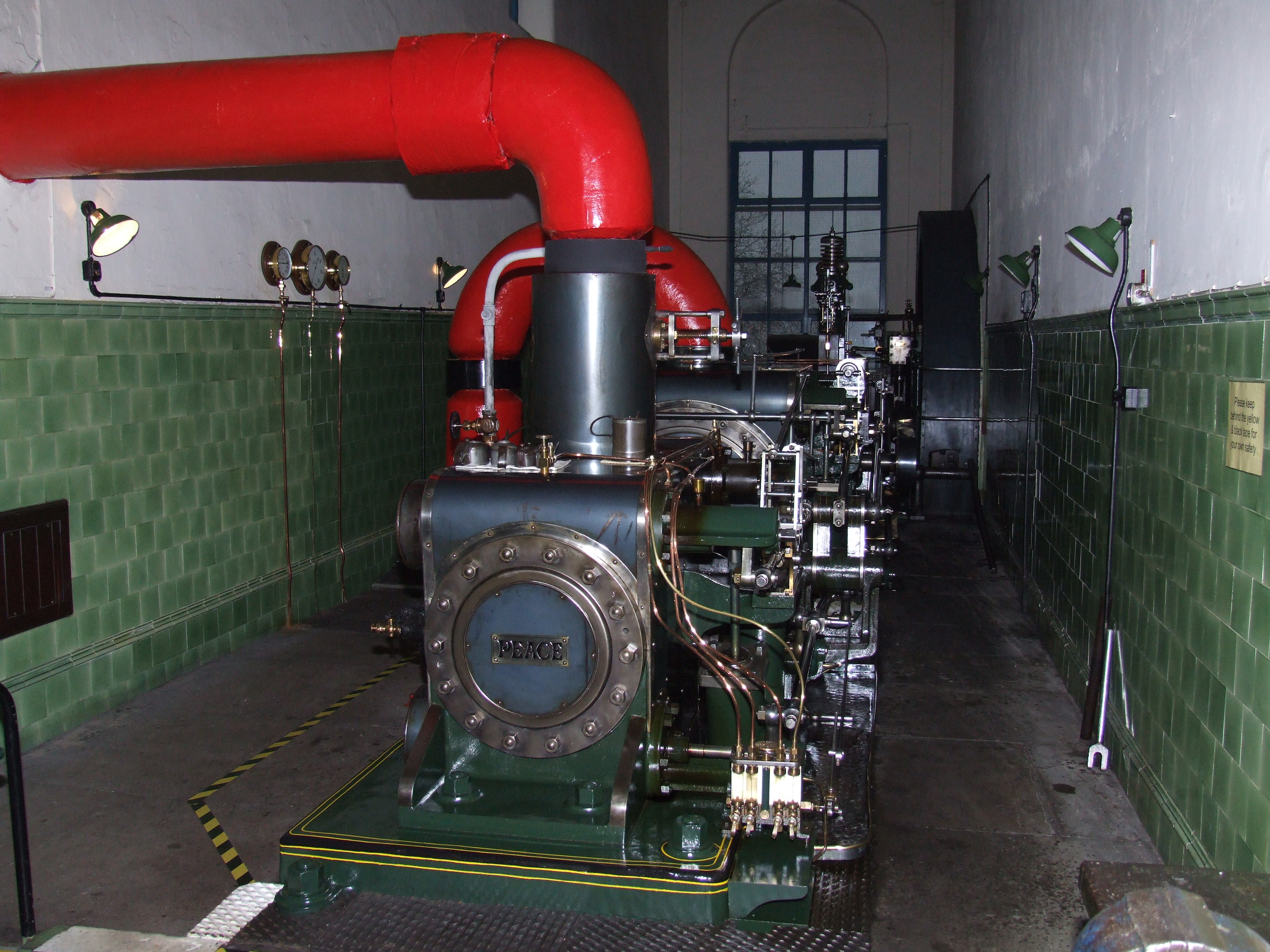
An 1895 stationary steam engine built by William Roberts & Co of Nelson installed at Queen Street Mill Textile Museum, Burnley

There was a worsted mill at Lomeshaye close to a "cotton factory" and another cotton mill along the canal at Reedyford by 1848. Walverden Mill in Leeds Road was built in 1850, and it was soon followed by others. From 1862, Phoenix Foundry, the steam engine factory of William Roberts, stood at the site of the shopping centre's car park, and has been called "Nelson's most significant engineering site". By 1891, there were 57 cotton spinners and manufacturers listed in Nelson. The largest had 1,950 looms and the smallest only 8.

The cotton industry was the most important in the town, and by 1910, more than 12,000 local workers were members of the Nelson and District Power-Loom Weavers' Association.

Nelson is considered part of the Burnley Coalfield. There is evidence of old bell pits and surface mining at Swinden Clough and Castercliff, and as early as 1465 there was a complaint of people unlawfully digging coal in the area. Clough Head Colliery, also known as Town House Pit, was on Clough Head Beck on the eastern edge of the town and it had a troubled history. While under construction in 1845, an accident during assembly of the steam pumping engine resulted in the death of one worker. On 12 April 1850, six men were working in the pit when one man went to check for gas with a safety lamp, but before he had signalled it was safe, another man opened his lamp causing an explosion that killed them all. Another explosion in November 1856 resulted in two fatalities. A surface tramroad connected it to railway sidings at Bradley Lane Head. It is uncertain when the colliery closed, but it was possibly in the late 1880s.

The town became associated in the 20th century with the production of confectionery, including Jelly Babies and Victory V, and it was where the package holiday company Airtours (formerly Pendle Travel and now part of Thomas Cook) began life as an independent travel agent. The textile industry, in particular, has now sharply declined, leaving the town with low property prices and higher than average unemployment.

== Governance ==
Nelson was granted its charter of incorporation as a municipal borough by Queen Victoria in 1890. Radical left wing politics in the early 20th century led to it being labelled "Little Moscow" by both the local and national press; indeed, the Nelson Leader ran the headline "Moscow calling" during the lock-out of 1928. There was significant Communist Party influence in the town between the wars. When the Labour Party came to power in the town, they responded to local political feeling by placing utilities such as gas and water under the control of the municipal council, anticipating by decades the nationalisation of such utilities after World War II. The council refused, moreover, to participate in celebrations for King George V's silver jubilee in 1935, saying that they would rather spend public money on free dinners for school children and the jobless.

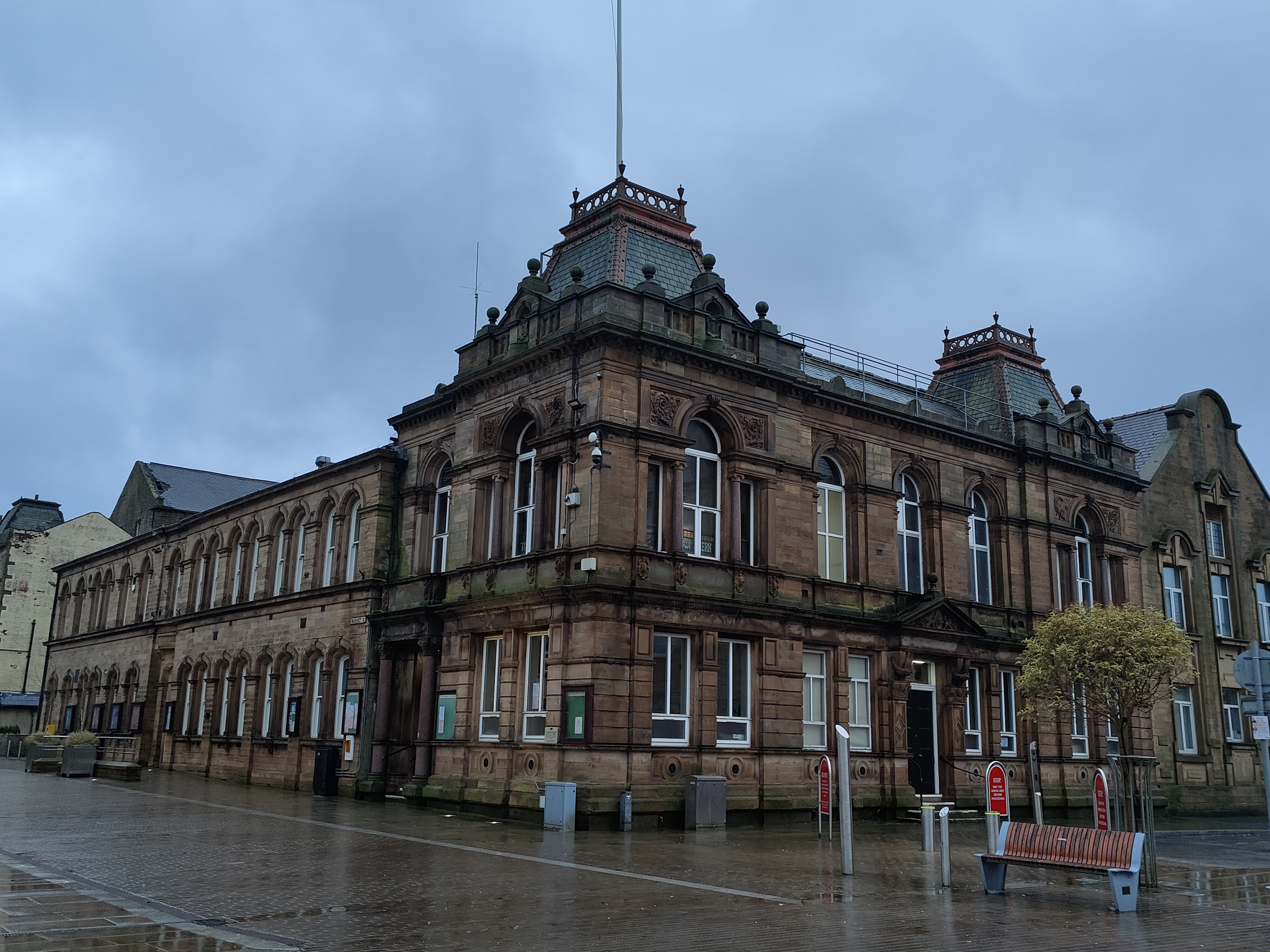
Nelson Town Hall

Under the Local Government Act 1972, the town became part of the non-metropolitan district of Pendle on 1 April 1974. Initially forming part of an unparished area, a new Nelson civil parish was formed in 2008, covering a similar area to the old municipal borough. It currently has three tiers of local government, Lancashire County Council, Pendle Borough Council and a town council, with 24 councillors, which was elected for the first time on 1 May 2008. Nelson Town Council and the wider Pendle Borough Council are situated at Nelson Town Hall on Market Square.

After boundary changes in 2020 which reduced the number of wards in the borough to 12, four cover parts of Nelson parish – Bradley, Brierfield East & Clover Hill, Marsden & Southfield and Whitefield & Walverden. Pendle Borough Council is currently under 'No Overall Control' and governed by a coalition of independents and Liberal Democrats, led by Councillor Mohammed Iqbal. The mayor is a ceremonial post, rotated annually.

Lancashire County Council was governed from 1994 to 2009 by Labour, at which point it switched to Conservative control, then to no overall control in 2013, and back to Conservative in 2017. The town is represented on the council in three divisions: Brierfield & Nelson North, Nelson South, and Pendle Central.

The Member of Parliament for Pendle and Clitheroe, the constituency into which the town falls, is Jonathan Hinder (Labour), who was first elected in 2024.

== Demography ==
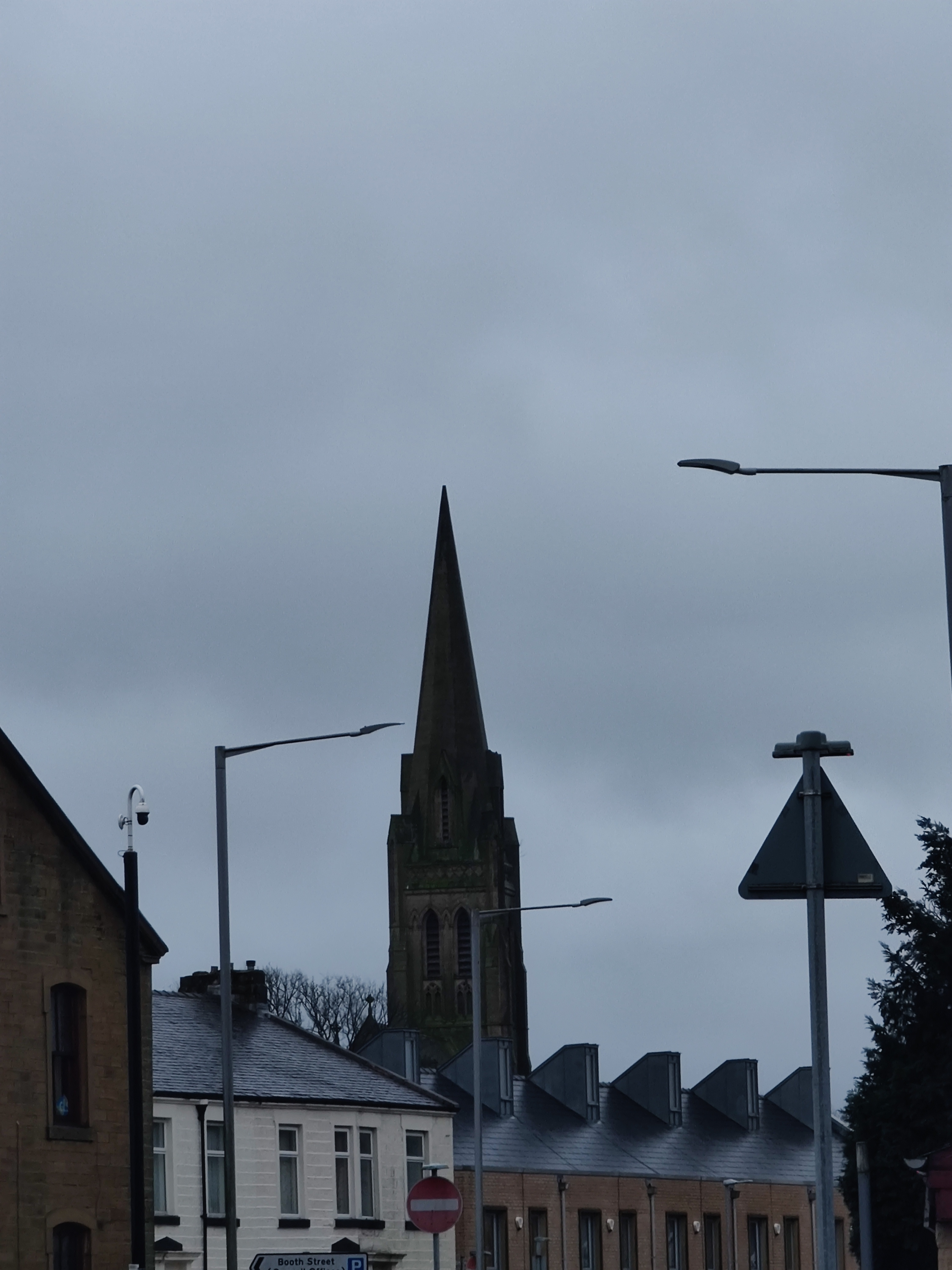
Spire of the former St Mary's Church

Year	1911	1921	1931	1939	1951	1961	1971	2001	2011
Population	39,479	39,841	38,304	34,803	34,384	32,292	31,286	28,998	29,135

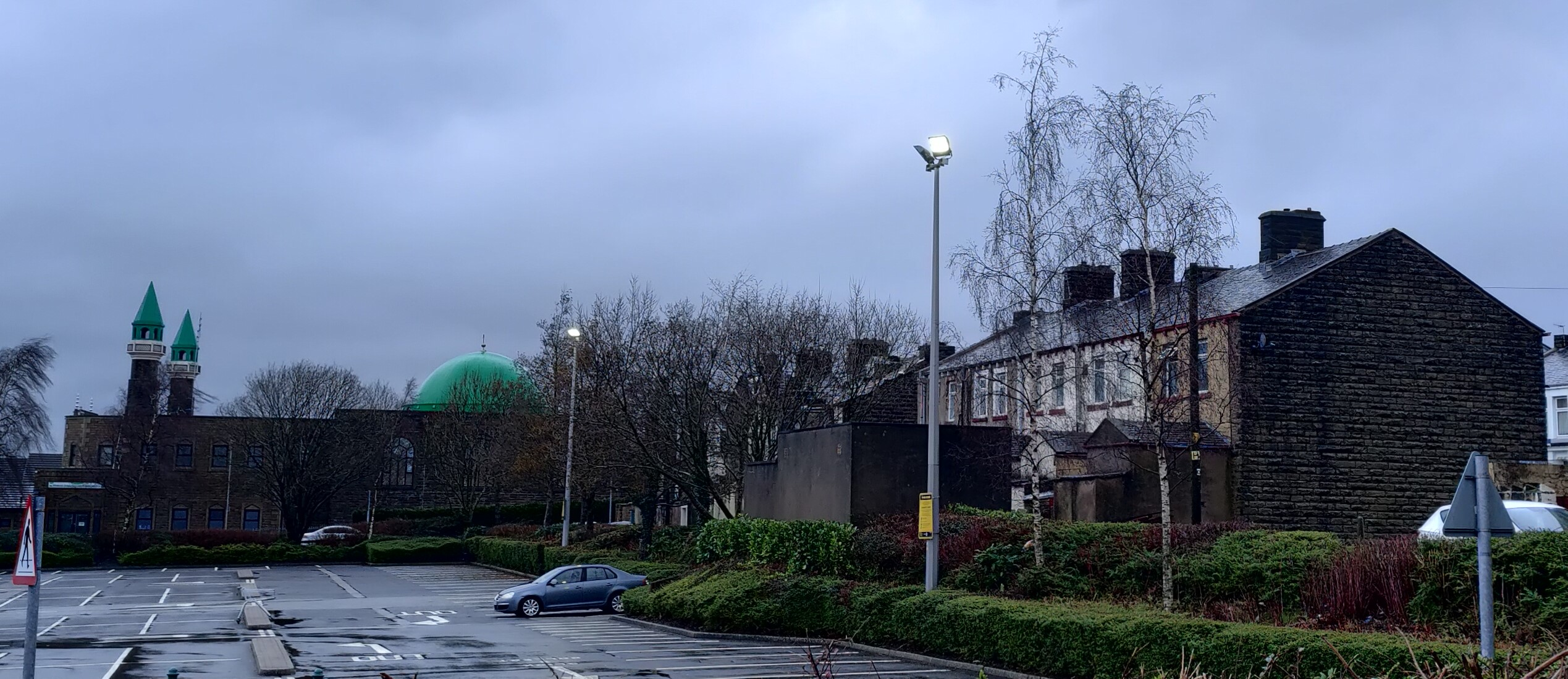
Nelson Central Mosque

In the 2011 Census the Middle-layer Super Output Areas (MSOAs) of Nelson East, Nelson West and Nelson Bradley, making up the bulk of the town of Nelson, had Asian populations of 4,615, 6,818 and 4,489 respectively, compared to White populations of 5,370, 2,216 and 2,891. In total, the Asian population of the three MSOAs came to 57.5% of the total population, with the White population making up 37.8% of total population.

== Economy ==
The Pendle Rise Shopping Centre has been the focal point of the town centre for over 50 years. It opened as the Arndale Centre in June 1967 and was rebranded as the Admiral Shopping Centre before taking its current name. Nelson Market (previously Admiral's Market) is a covered market below the Pendle Rise Shopping Centre. The Victory Centre opened on the site of the former Salem Chapel in 1993. Of the 12 units only one remained occupied in 2017, by a branch of William Hill.

The main road through the town centre, pedestrianised in the early 1990s, was reopened to traffic in August 2011, to help boost trade. In 2012, Nelson was among twelve English towns chosen to participate in the Portas Pilot Areas initiative, receiving £100,000 to help rejuvenate the shopping area.

The largest business park in the town is located at Lomeshaye, by Junction 12 of the M65. The original 15-hectare site was designated as an Enterprise Zone on 7 December 1983. The estate currently occupies 53 hectares and is home to more than 80 businesses. Between them they employ approximately 4,000 people on the estate. A 31-hectare site was taken out of the Green Belt when the council's new Local Plan was adopted in December 2015, to facilitate a further extension to the west and north. The Lomeshaye Business Village, a refurbished former cotton mill to the east of the estate, contains a further 151 units, principally occupied by small and medium-sized enterprises engaged in office and light industrial uses.

== Transport ==
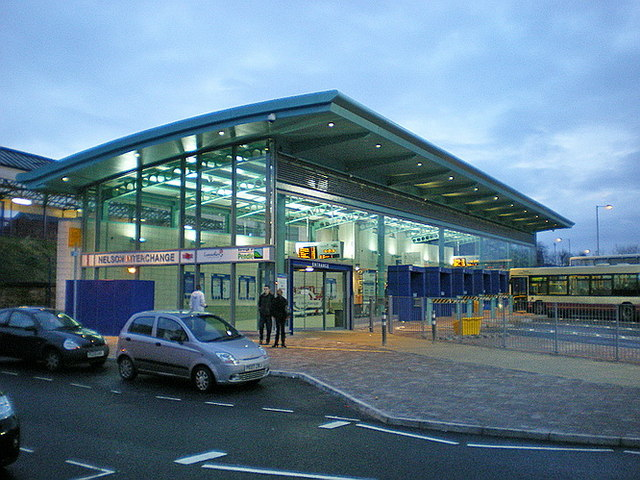
Nelson Interchange

Nelson is served by Junction 13 of the M65 motorway, which runs west to Burnley, Accrington, Blackburn and Preston, and north-east to Colne. From the town centre, the A56 runs southwest to the M65 at Brierfield and north-east to Colne and beyond, while the A682 – Britain's most dangerous road – heads north into the Yorkshire Dales.

In November 1969, a multi-storey car park with space for 350 cars was opened in Nelson. The car park was demolished in 2019 to make way for a McDonalds.

In December 2008, the town's new bus and rail interchange was opened at a site which used the existing railway station. The new interchange facility cost £4.5 million and included enhancements such as cycle stands, taxi and car drop-off facilities, electronic information displays, a direct link to the railway station including a passenger lift and an enclosed passenger concourse with 10 bus stands.

Rail services to and from Nelson are provided by Northern. The Interchange has an hourly stopping service 7 days a week west to Preston via Blackburn, and east to Colne.

The main bus operator in Nelson is Burnley Bus Company, although Vision Bus operate some services. The town has good bus links into Burnley with limited services on to Manchester: X43 Witch Way service (operated by Burnley Bus Company) runs from Burnley and Rawtenstall to Manchester city centre, using a fleet of specially branded double-decker buses. Some early morning X43 journeys to/from Manchester start at Nelson instead of Burnley. Mainline services run up to every 10 minutes west to Burnley and east to Colne, Keighley and Skipton.

== Sport and leisure ==
=== Football ===
Nelson F.C. were Football League members from 1921 until 1931 and played in the lower semi-professional leagues until resigning from the North West Counties League in 2010 (returning in 2011). Nelson F.C were the first English team to beat Real Madrid in Spain, in 1923.

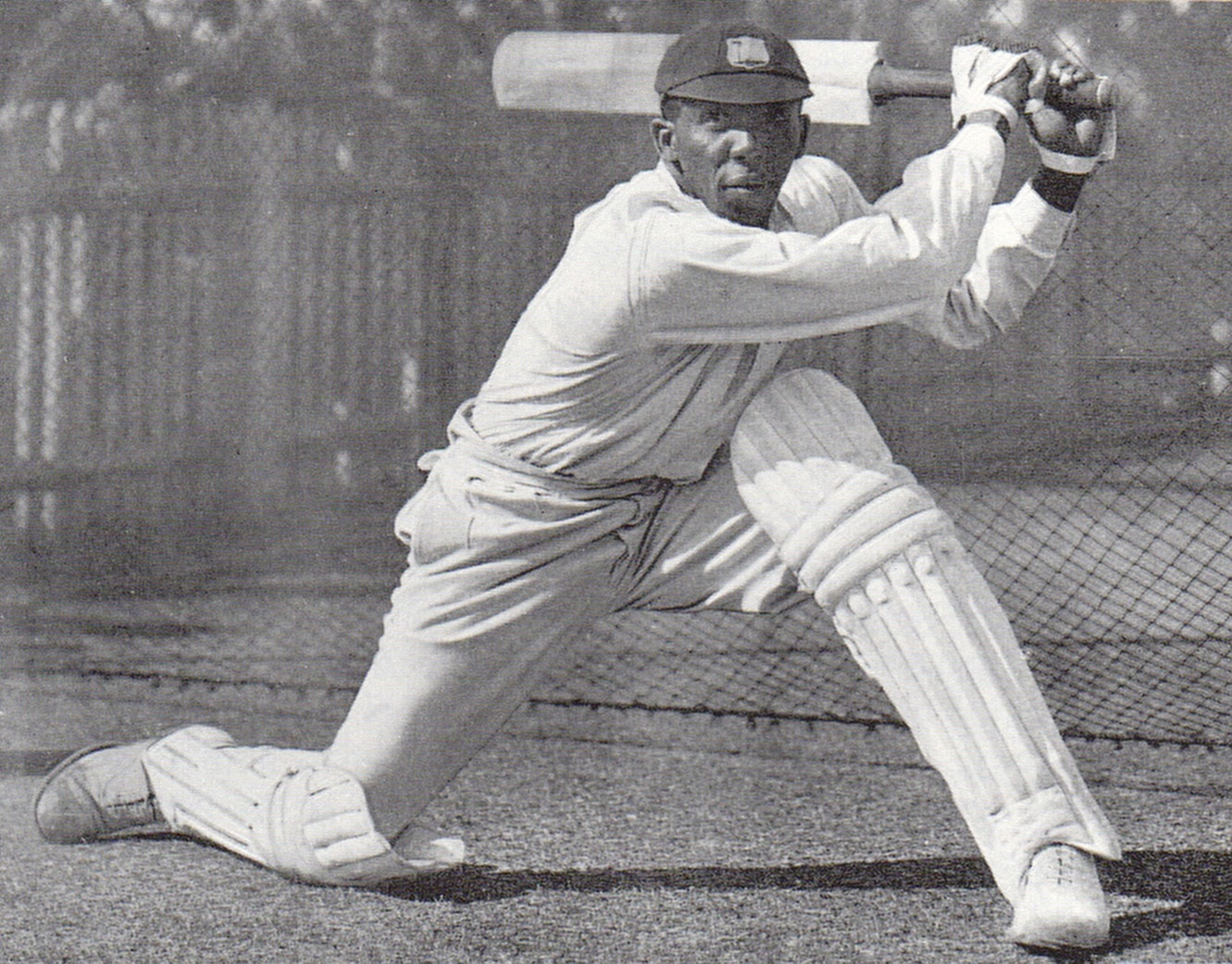
Learie Constantine (1930)

=== Cricket ===
Nelson Cricket Club was established in 1861 and was a founding member of the Lancashire League in 1892. Nelson Cricket club has a significant success record, with 21 Lancashire League championship titles to its name. During the inter-war period, when the club enjoyed the services of Learie Constantine, the West Indian cricketer; when in 1969 Constantine became the first person of African descent to be given a life peerage, he chose to be gazetted as Baron Constantine, of Maraval in Trinidad and Tobago and of Nelson in the County Palatine of Lancaster. Nelson field three senior teams in the Lancashire League and an established junior training section that play competitive cricket in the Lancashire Junior League.

=== Speedway racing ===
Speedway racing was staged at Seedhill Stadium from 1967 to 1970. The Nelson Admirals were founder members of the British League Division Two. The team later moved en bloc to Odsal Stadium, Bradford. The track was also used for stock car racing.

=== Golf ===
The town also has two golf clubs. Marsdon Park Golf Club on Townhouse Road in an 18 hole municipal, par 70 parkland golf course that opened in 1968. Nelson Golf Club, founded in 1902, is private club with an 18-hole moorland golf course in Kings Causeway.

=== Wrestling ===
Nelson Wrestling Club is affiliated the British Wrestling Association.

== Recreation ==
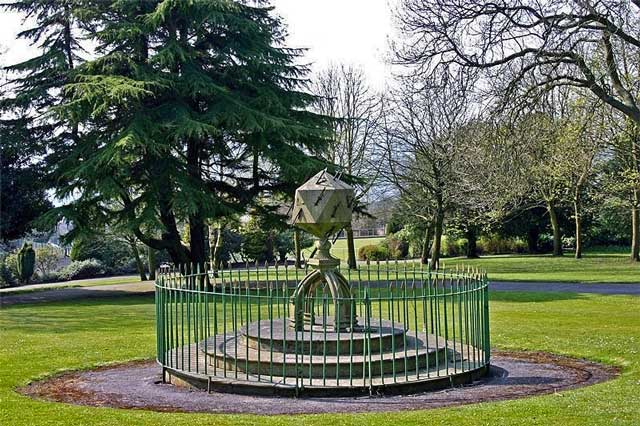
Marsden Park

The town is home to several parks the most notable of which are Victoria Park and Marsden Park. The Heritage Trust for the North West have numerous campaigns and projects in the area. One has resulted in the restoration and conservation of a whole street of Victorian workers housing, a former primary school and cotton mill, as it was feared that the industrial heritage of the town was at risk. St Mary's Church is also another major project in the town, which is planned to open as an exhibition centre in Summer 2012.

== Media ==
Nelson along with the neighbouring town of Colne are mentioned in the 1991 song It's Grim Up North by the band KLF.

Local news and television programmes are provided by BBC North West and ITV Granada. Television signals are received from the Winter Hill TV transmitter and the local relay TV transmitter located in the Forest of Pendle.

Local radio for Nelson is currently provided by Capital Manchester and Lancashire formerly 2BR and BBC Radio Lancashire, and – since September 2007 – by community radio service Pendle Community Radio, aimed primarily at the local Asian community. There are two local newspapers: the Nelson Leader, published on Fridays, and the daily Lancashire Telegraph, which publishes a local edition for Burnley and Pendle.

== Notable people ==
- George Faucett Pitts Abbott (1897−1977), British sailor during the First World War
- Margaret Aldersley (1852−1940), suffragist and feminist lived and campaigned in the town
- Bernie Calvert (born 1942), musician, The Hollies
- David Fishwick (born 1971), businessman
- Sir Frank Hartley (1911−1997), pharmacist, vice-chancellor of the University of London 1976–78
- Tony Hicks (born 1945), musician, The Hollies
- C. L. R. James (1901−1989), author, intellectual and writer on cricket, lived in Nelson before moving to London
- Ted Koppel (born 1940), British-American broadcast journalist, was born in Nelson
- Eric Knowles (born 1953), a British antiques expert whose main interest is in ceramics
- Graham Thomson Lyall (1892−1941), English-born officer in the Canadian army, awarded the Victoria Cross, lived in Nelson, 1900−1912
- John Pickles, distinguished professor of geography, University of North Carolina, USA
- John Simm (born 1970), actor
- Albert Smith (1867−1942), MP, trade unionist, Justice of the Peace and Captain in the British Army during WWI
- Kevin Smith (born 1954), entrepreneur
- Kathryn Stott (born 1958), classical pianist
- Thomas Stuttard Tattersall, recipient of the Edward Medal in silver during WWI
- Nicola Wheeler (born 1974), actress, Emmerdale; lived in Nelson and went to Walton High School

=== Sport ===
- Learie Constantine (1901−1971), West Indian cricketer, played 18 Test cricket matches and 119 First-class cricket matches, also lawyer and politician who played for Nelson cricket club with great distinction between 1929 and 1938
- Jimmy Hogan (1882−1974), footballer and manager, played 131 games
- Mike Phelan (born 1962), footballer and coach, played 485 games
- Duncan Spencer (born 1972), cricketer, played 16 First-class cricket games
- Harold Whalley (1923–1997), professional footballer, played 27 games

== See also ==
- Listed buildings in Nelson, Lancashire
- Nelson Corporation Tramways
- Nelson power station
