= Listed buildings in Nelson, Lancashire =

Nelson is a town and civil parish in Pendle, Lancashire, England. It contains 38 listed buildings that are recorded in the National Heritage List for England. Of these, one is at Grade II*, the middle grade, and the others are at Grade II, the lowest grade. The parish contains the town of Nelson and surrounding countryside. Originally an agricultural area, the first mill arrived in 1780, and by the 19th century cotton weaving, which has since declined, was the dominant industry. Most of the listed buildings are houses, farmhouses, and farm buildings. The Leeds and Liverpool Canal passes through the parish, and the listed building associated with this are three bridges and a canalside warehouse. Other than the warehouse, there are no listed industrial buildings. The other listed buildings include a medieval stone, three churches, a set of stocks, a hotel, cemetery buildings, and a memorial.

== Key ==
Grade	Criteria
II*	Particularly important buildings of more than special interest
II	Buildings of national importance and special interest

== Buildings ==
Name and location	Photograph	Date	Notes	Grade
Scholefield House; 53.82428°N 2.20556°W	—	1617	Part of a former high status house, subsequently reduced and altered. It is in sandstone with a stone-slate roof, in two storeys, and with an irregular plan. On the front is a two-storey gabled porch with a moulded surround and a painted inscribed lintel. The doorway into the house is chamfered and has large quoins. The windows on the front are mullioned, and at the rear they are sashes.	II
Scholefield Farmhouse; 53.82432°N 2.20548°W	—	1617	The farmhouse is attached to Scholefield House. It has square stone mullioned windows with leaded lights. There is also a large staircase window with an arched head.	II
Southfield Fold Farmhouse and cottage 53.82945°N 2.18540°W	—	Early 17th century	The building is in stone with a stone-slate roof. It has two storeys, and an L-shaped plan, consisting of a main range and a cross wing. The windows are mullioned, although some mullions have been lost. In the main front is a doorway with a plain surround. Inside there is a cellar with a vaulted roof.	II
Lower Town House; 53.83322°N 2.18732°W		17th century	A stone house with large quoins and a stone-slate roof. It has a three-bay main range and a rear wing. On the front is a single-storey porch with a slate roof and a moulded Tudor arched doorway. The windows are mullioned, those in the ground floor having drip labels.	II*
Packhorse bridge 53.82284°N 2.17598°W		17th century (possible)	The former packhorse bridge carries pedestrians over Catlow Brook. It is in sandstone, and has a small semicircular arch with voussoirs, and a battlemented parapet.	II
Ringstone Hill Farmhouse; 53.82578°N 2.16679°W		17th century	The house is rendered with a stone-slate roof, and has two storeys. On the front is a modern porch and a doorway with a plain surround. The windows are mullioned, and there is a later lean-to extension to the right.	II
Cold Weather House Farmhouse; 53.82269°N 2.20215°W	—	Mid to late 17th century	A stone house with quoins and a stone-slate roof in two storeys and threebays. The windows are mullioned. On the front is a two-storey porch with a moulded doorway, above which is a datestone.	II
Catlow Fold Farm and Catlow Hall; 53.82439°N 2.17899°W		1666 (probable)	A stone house that is partly pebbledashed, with a stone-slate roof, in two storeys with an attic. It consists of a main range, a cross wing, and a rear wing. On the entrance front are three gables and a round-headed doorway. Some windows are mullioned, some are sashes, and others are modern.	II
Marsden Hall; 53.83899°N 2.18597°W		c 1700	The house, later used for other purposes, is in stone with a hipped stone-slate roof and has two storeys. Most of the windows are mullioned, and the doorway has a plain surround. At the rear is a large window with a moulded surround, including a lion's head, and a sundial showing the time in 17 different locations.	II
Further Clough Head Cottage; 53.83222°N 2.19606°W	—	Early 18th century (probable)	The house is in stone with a stone-slate roof. Some of the windows have lost their mullions, and others are later fixed windows.	II
Higher Scholefield Cottage; 53.82412°N 2.20562°W	—	Early 18th century (probable)	A house, originally two cottages, in stone with a stone-slate roof. The windows are mullioned, and there are two doorways with chamfered jambs and heads, one of which has been blocked.	II
Edge End House; 53.82674°N 2.22229°W	—	Mid 18th century (probable)	A stone house with rusticated quoins and a stone-slate roof. It has two storeys and a symmetrical three-bay front. The windows are mullioned and transomed, and the doorway is round-headed with a triple keystone.	II
Stocks; 53.82851°N 2.21639°W		18th century	The stocks are in St Paul's churchyard. They consist of two stone uprights each containing two grooves. The heads are rounded and contain sockets.	II
Chapel House and Cottage; 53.82999°N 2.21636°W	—	Mid to late 18th century	Originally one house, later two dwellings, it is in stone with a stone-slate roof. There are two storeys with a symmetrical front that has a central round-headed doorway with a moulded architrave and a pediment. Above the doorway is a semicircular-headed window with a keystone. The other windows are sashes with stepped heads.	II
Coach House, Marsden Hall; 53.83871°N 2.18480°W	—	Mid to late 18th century	The former coach house is in sandstone with a stone-slate roof, and has two storeys. It has an L-shaped plan, and contains round-headed wagon entrances, windows, some of which are mullioned, external steps leading up to a balcony, various doorways, and a sundial with a frieze and an inscribed panel. On one gable is an urn finial, and on another is a three-dimensional cruciform finial.	II
Marsden Park Cottage, Marsden Hall Cottage and archway 53.83907°N 2.18583°W	—	Mid to late 18th century	A pair of cottages linked by a wagon archway. They are in sandstone, the cottages have concrete tile roofs and two storeys, and between them is a tall. elliptical archway. Features include gables, one of which has an urn on the apex, openings with plain surrounds, and windows with altered glazing.	II
Walverden Cottage; 53.82704°N 2.20245°W	—	Mid to late 18th century	A former farmhouse in stone with quoins and a stone-slate roof. It has two storeys and a central doorway with a deep plain lintel. The windows are sashes, most of which have retained their mullions.	II
2 and 4 Church Street; 53.82868°N 2.21664°W	—	Late 18th century	A pair of stone cottages with a stone-slate roof. Each cottage has a plain doorway with a sash window to the right, and two sash windows in the upper floor.	II
Catlow House; 53.82529°N 2.17931°W		Late 18th century	A stone house with quoins and a stone-slate roof, it has two storeys and a symmetrical front. The doorway has a moulded pediment, and the windows are sashes, some with mullions.	II
Cold Weather House; 53.82275°N 2.20171°W	—	Late 18th century (probable)	The house is in stone with a stone-slate roof, with two storeys and three bays. In the centre is a doorway with a plain surround. Most of the windows are sashes, and there is a stair window with a semicircular head.	II
Cottage, Scholefield House; 53.82431°N 2.20576°W	—	Late 18th century (probable)	The cottage has been used later for agricultural purposes. It is in stone with quoins and has a stone-slate roof, The building contains mullioned windows and a doorway with a plain surround. There is an external stone staircase leading to two first floor doorways.	II
Farm building, Scholefield House; 53.82450°N 2.20553°W	—	Late 18th century	The farm building is in sandstone with a stone-slate roof. It has two storeys and a south front of five bays, and contains doorways and windows.	II
Southfield Cottages; 53.82772°N 2.18589°W	—	Late 18th century	A row of four former weavers' cottages, in stone with quoins and a stone-slate roof. No 4 has two storeys, and the others have three. The windows are mullioned.	II
Lomeshaye Bridge (No 140); 53.83467°N 2.22397°W		1795	The bridge carries Lomeshaye Road over the Leeds and Liverpool Canal. It is in stone and consists of a single elliptical arch with rusticated voussoirs. The bridge has a plain parapet that ends in piers.	II
Whitefield Bridge (No 141); 53.83704°N 2.22276°W		1795	The bridge carries Victoria Street over the Leeds and Liverpool Canal. It is in stone and consists of a single elliptical arch with rusticated voussoirs. The bridge has a plain parapet and curved abutments that end in piers.	II
Swinden Bridge (No 142); 53.84859°N 2.20620°W		1795	A roving bridge over the Leeds and Liverpool Canal. It is in stone and consists of a single elliptical arch with rusticated voussoirs. The bridge has a plain parapet and curved abutments that end in piers.	II
Southfield Methodist Church and barn 53.82778°N 2.18625°W		1797	The barn is in stone with a stone-slate roof. It contains a wide segmental-arched entrance with an inscribed keystone and Venetian windows. Part of it was converted into a Methodist chapel in about 1800. On the building is a plaque inscribed with details of John Wesley's preaching there in 1786.	II
Southfield House; 53.82753°N 2.18576°W	—	Late 18th or early 19th century	The house has been divided into three dwellings. It is in stone with a stone-slate roof, and has two storeys and a five-bay front. The doorway has moulded jambs and a canopy.	II
St Paul's Church; 53.82874°N 2.21631°W		1809	The church is in stone with a slate roof. It consists of a nave, a small chancel, and a tower incorporating the south porch. The tower has a moulded doorway and a pyramidal spire with a finial. On the south side of the church are two tiers of windows with pointed heads, and on the north side are two tall lancet windows. Inside is a gallery on three sides carried on cast iron columns with foliated capitals.	II
Spring Cottage; 53.83304°N 2.22177°W		Early 19th century	A large house, later altered, in sandstone with a Welsh slate roof. It has an extended U-plan, later infilled, with two storeys and attics. The entrance front has six bays and three gables. Features include mullioned windows, a doorway with a moulded surround, bay windows, one of which is crenellated, and decorative chimney pots.	II
Leeds and Liverpool Canal Warehouse; 53.83845°N 2.21934°W		c. 1876	The warehouse is in red brick with a sandstone plinth, quoins, and dressings, and a slate roof, and is in three storeys. It contains loading bays, canopies, and windows with segmental heads and keystones. (Note: Street View in June 2011 shows that the warehouse has been converted for other uses.)	II
St Mary's Church; 53.83436°N 2.22018°W		1879	The church was extended by the addition of a bay and a tower in 1905–08. It is in stone with a slate roof, and is in Early English style. The church consists of a nave with a clerestory, aisles, a chancel, and a west steeple. The steeple consists of a three-stage tower with buttresses rising to pinnacles, and an octagonal spire with lucarnes. It is now redundant and has been converted for other uses.	II
Station Hotel; 53.83533°N 2.21483°W		1893	A hotel and public house in sandstone with a slate roof, in free Jacobean style. The entrance front has five bays, and is in two storeys other than the middle bay, which has three storeys and is gabled. The doorway is in the second bay, and the windows are mullioned and transomed. Flanking the front are turrets with tiled roofs, that on the left having a polygonal roof, and on the right a conical roof. On the right return is a canted oriel window.	II
Cemetery Chapel; 53.84132°N 2.19454°W	—	1893–95	A pair of similar chapels in stone with slate roofs joined by an archway to form a symmetrical composition. The arch is moulded with voussoirs, and is surmounted by a square tower and an octagonal crocketed spire. Each chapel has a gabled porch, an embattled parapet, a balustrade, and buttresses rising to crocketed pinnacles. There are finials on all peaks.	II
Cemetery gateway and railings 53.84196°N 2.19744°W	—	1895	The gateway consists of a pair of gate piers flanking the main entrance, outside which are smaller piers flanking the pedestrian entrances. These are linked by a curved wall to a pair of terminal piers. The entrances contain ornate wrought iron gates. The piers are in stone, rusticated in the lower part and elaborately decorated above.	II
Old Library; 53.83632°N 2.21603°W		1908	The former library by architects John Rigby Poyser and William Brandreth Savidge is clad in ashlar Yorkshire stone, much of it rusticated, with slate roofs. It is in Edwardian Baroque style, and has a rectangular plan with one storey and a semi-basement. The main northwest front is symmetrical with three bays, each with a broken segmental pediment; the entrance in the centre bay has a triangular pediment. The southwest front is also symmetrical with three bays. The central bay contains a three-light window, with a Diocletian window above, and a broken triangular pediment at the top. In the outer bays are Venetian windows.	II
Former Union Bank of Manchester; 53.83689°N 2.21430°W		1913	The bank, on a corner site in the centre of the town, is in Edwardian Baroque style. It is built in rusticated sandstone on a plinth, with moulded string courses, a moulded roof cornice, and a slate roof. There are two storeys and an irregular polygon plan, with a front of three canted bays. In the central bay is a portico with Ionic columns, above which is a five-light oriel window, over which is a balustrade, and a pedimented gable containing a lunette window with voussoirs and a keystone. In the flanking bays are bow windows. At the rear is a two-stage clock tower on which is a rotunda with eight Ionic columns carrying an entablature, above which is a lead dome with four clock faces.	II
Boy Scout War Memorial; 53.83728°N 2.21622°W		1919	The memorial by Job Davies commemorates the local Boy Scouts who were lost in the First World War. It is in Yorkshire gritstone and depicts a Bot Scout in the uniform of the time standing on a square pedestal itself on a square plinth. There are inscriptions on the sides of the pedestal, and a laurel wreath on the base of the front face.	II

== Notes and references ==
=== Sources ===
- Hartwell, Clare; Pevsner, Nikolaus (2009) [1969], Lancashire: North, The Buildings of England, New Haven and London: Yale University Press, ISBN 978-0-300-12667-9
- Historic England, "Scholefield House, Nelson (1073375)", National Heritage List for England
- Historic England, "Scholefield Farmhouse, Nelson (1243566)", National Heritage List for England
- Historic England, "Southfield Fold Farmhouse and cottage adjoining, Nelson (1361733)", National Heritage List for England
- Historic England, "Lower Town House, Nelson (1073369)", National Heritage List for England
- Historic England, "Packhorse bridge at SD 884 362, Nelson (1072665)", National Heritage List for England
- Historic England, "Ringstone Hill Farmhouse, Nelson (1243475)", National Heritage List for England
- Historic England, "Cold Weather House Farmhouse, Nelson (1073372)", National Heritage List for England
- Historic England, "Catlow Fold Farm and Catlow Hall, Nelson (1361731)", National Heritage List for England
- Historic England, "Marsden Hall, Nelson (1073342)", National Heritage List for England
- Historic England, "Further Clough Head Cottage, Nelson (1073341)", National Heritage List for England
- Historic England, "Higher Scholefield Cottage, Nelson (1361713)", National Heritage List for England
- Historic England, "Edge End House, Nelson (1272825)", National Heritage List for England
- Historic England, "Stocks 20 metres south of Church of St Paul, Nelson (1073371)", National Heritage List for England
- Historic England, "Chapel House and Chapel House Cottage, Nelson (1073373)", National Heritage List for England
- Historic England, "Former Coach-house to Marsden Hall, Nelson (1271878)", National Heritage List for England
- Historic England, "Marsden Park Cottage, Marsden Hall Cottage and linking archway, Nelson (1245394)", National Heritage List for England
- Historic England, "Walverden Cottage, Nelson (1243471)", National Heritage List for England
- Historic England, "Nos 2 and 4 Church Street, Nelson (1073370)", National Heritage List for England
- Historic England, "Catlow House, Nelson (1073338)", National Heritage List for England
- Historic England, "Cold Weather House, Nelson (1243538)", National Heritage List for England
- Historic England, "Cottage immediately west of Scholefield House, Nelson (1073337)", National Heritage List for England
- Historic England, "Farm outbuilding to the north of Scholefield House, Nelson (1245395)", National Heritage List for England
- Historic England, "Southfield Cottages, Nelson (1361732)", National Heritage List for England
- Historic England, "Lemeshaye Bridge No 140, Nelson (1243541)", National Heritage List for England
- Historic England, "Whitefield Bridge No 141, Nelson (1073374)", National Heritage List for England
- Historic England, "Swinden Bridge No 142, Nelson (1361712)", National Heritage List for England
- Historic England, "Southfield Methodist Church and barn at Southfield House, Nelson (1073340)", National Heritage List for England
- Historic England, "Southfield House, Nelson (1073339)", National Heritage List for England
- Historic England, "Church of St Paul, Nelson (1272862)", National Heritage List for England
- Historic England, "Spring Cottage, Nelson (1390765)", National Heritage List for England
- Historic England, "Leeds and Liverpool Canal Warehouse, Nelson (1243866)", National Heritage List for England
- Historic England, "Church of St Mary, Nelson (1243542)", National Heritage List for England
- Historic England, "The Station Hotel, Nelson (1113186)", National Heritage List for England
- Historic England, "Cemetery Chapel, Nelson (1361734)", National Heritage List for England
- Historic England, "Gateway and railings to cemetery, Nelson (1272824)", National Heritage List for England
- Historic England, "Former Nelson Old Library, Nelson (1440566)", National Heritage List for England
- Historic England, "Former Union Bank of Manchester, Nelson (1472844)", National Heritage List for England
- Historic England, "Boy Scout War Memorial, Nelson (1424664)", National Heritage List for England
- Historic England, Listed Buildings
