= George Abbott (GC) =

George Faucett Pitts Abbott
- Born: 18 September 1897; Nelson, Lancashire
- Died: 10 June 1977 (aged 79); Higham, Lancashire
- Military career
- Allegiance: United Kingdom
- Branch: Royal Navy
- Rank: Deckhand
- Conflicts: First World War
- Awards: Albert Medal (later George Cross)
- Other work: Factory worker, shopkeeper

George Faucett Pitts Abbott, GC (18 September 1897 – 10 June 1977) was a British sailor and a recipient of the Albert Medal, later exchanged for the George Cross.

== Early life ==
Abbott was born in Nelson, Lancashire, educated at Whitefield School, and was working in a textile factory on the outbreak of the First World War, eventually enlisting into the Royal Naval Reserve (Trawler Section) in August 1916.

== Albert Medal ==
On 14 December 1917, dated 12 December 1917, Abbott was gazetted for his actions on 14 September 1917. His citation read:

The King has been pleased to award the Albert Medal in Gold to Nicholas Rath, Seaman, R.N.R., and the Albert Medal to Richard Knoulton, Ordinary Seaman, R.N., and George Faucett Pitts Abbott, Deckhand, R.N.R. (Trawler Section), in recognition of their gallantry in saving life in the following circumstances: On the 14th September, 1917, a seaplane collided with a Poulsen mast and remained wedged in it, the pilot (Acting Flight Commander E. A. de Ville) being rendered unconscious and thrown out of his seat on to one of the wings. The three men above mentioned at once climbed up the mast for 100 feet (30 m), when Rath, making use of the boatswain's chair, which moves on the inside of the mast, was hoisted up by men at the foot of the mast to the place, over 300 feet (91 m) from the ground, where the seaplane was fixed. He then climbed out on the plane, and held the pilot until the arrival of Knoulton and Abbott, who passed the masthead gantline out to him. Having secured the pilot with the gantline, Rath, with the assistance of Knoulton and Abbott, lifted him from the plane to the inside of the mast and lowered him to the ground. The three men were very well aware of the damaged and insecure condition of the mast, which was bent to an angle where the seaplane had become wedged. One of the three supports of the mast was fractured, and, so far as the men knew, the mast or seaplane might at any time have collapsed.

Abbott was presented with his medal by the King at Buckingham Palace on 16 February 1918.

== Post-war life ==
After the war Abbot moved to Coventry, and during the Second World War worked in a munitions factory. He married Alice Emily Harris in 1946, and had a daughter. He ran a fish and chip shop in Northfleet, Kent, before moving back to Nelson in 1961 to run a grocery shop. He died in Higham, Lancashire, in 1977.
