= 2026 Pendle Borough Council election =

2026 English local government election

- 7 May 2026

10 out of 33 seats to Pendle Borough Council 17 seats needed for a majority
	First party	Second party
Leader	Asjad Mahmood (Note: Leader of the Independent Group.)	Ash Sutcliffe
Party	Independent	Conservative
Last election	12 seats, 34.3%	13 seats, 33.5%
Seats before	12 (Note: Of the 12 Independent councillors before the election, 10 sat in the Independent Group and 2 sat in the Pendle's True Independents (PTI) group.)	11
Seats won	4	1
Seats after	13	8
	Third party	Fourth party
Leader	David Whipp
Party	Liberal Democrats	Reform
Last election	8 seats, 14.6%	Did not stand
Seats before	9	1
Seats won	1	4
Seats after	7	5
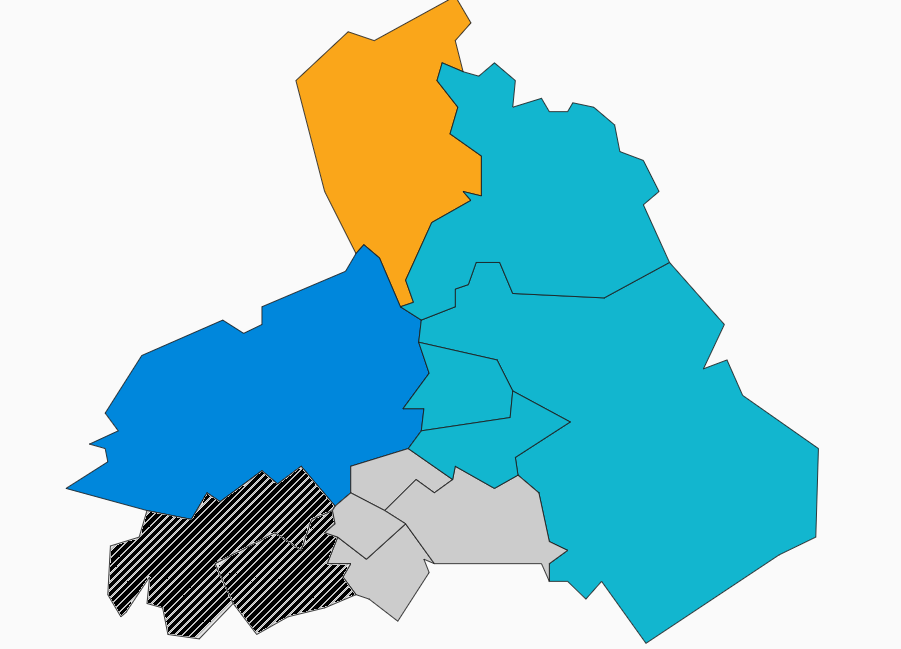
- 2026 Results Map
Leader before election
David Whipp
Liberal Democrats
No overall control (Note: Independent–Liberal Democrat coalition.)
Leader after election
Asjad Mahmood
Independent
No overall control (Note: Independent–Liberal Democrat coalition.)

The 2026 Pendle Borough Council election took place on 7 May 2026 to elect members of Pendle Borough Council in Lancashire, England. This was on the same day as other local elections.

Prior to the election, the council was under no overall control, being run by a coalition of the Liberal Democrats and most of the independent councillors, led by Liberal Democrat councillor David Whipp. The council remained under no overall control at this election. The same coalition of independent councillors and Liberal Democrats continued after the election, but David Whipp lost his seat. Independent councillor Asjad Mahmood was appointed as the new leader of the council at the subsequent annual meeting on 21 May 2026.

== Summary ==
=== Council composition ===
After 2024 election		Before 2026 election	
Party	Seats	Party	Seats
Conservative	13	Conservative	11
Liberal Democrats	8	Liberal Democrats	9
Reform	0	Reform	1
Independent	12	Independent	12

Changes 2024–2026:

- January 2025: Kieran McGladdery (Conservative) resigns – by-election held March 2025
- February 2025: Tom Ormerod (Conservative) resigns – by-election held May 2025
- March 2025: Andy Bell (Liberal Democrats) gains by-election from Conservatives
- May 2025: Marion Atkinson (Reform) gains by-election from Conservatives
- October 2025: Mick Strickland (Liberal Democrats) resigns – by-election held November 2025
- November 2025: Bryony Hartley (Liberal Democrats) wins by-election

== Incumbents ==
Ward	Incumbent councillor	Party	Re-standing
Barnoldswick	Chris Church	Liberal Democrats	Yes
Barrowford & Pendleside	Martyn Stone	Conservative	Yes
Boulsworth & Foulridge	Kevin Salter	Conservative	No
Bradley	Mohammad Kaleem	Conservative	No
Brierfield East & Clover Hill	Sajjad Ahmed	Independent	Yes
Earby & Coates	David Whipp	Liberal Democrats	Yes
Marsden & Southfield	Mohammad Ammer	Independent	No
Vivary Bridge	Andy Bell	Liberal Democrats	Yes
Waterside & Horsfield	Neil Butterworth	Conservative	No
Whitefield & Walverden	Ruby Anwar	Independent	No

== Election result ==
Council composition after the 2024 election

Council composition after the 2026 election

2026 Pendle Borough Council election
Party	This election				Full council			This election		
Party	Candidates	Seats	Net	Seats %	Other	Total	Total %	Votes	Votes %	+/−
Reform	{{{candidates}}}	4	▲4	40.00	1	5	15.15	7,380	31.71	
Independent	{{{candidates}}}	4	▲4	40.00	9	13	39.39	4,173	17.93	
Conservative	{{{candidates}}}	1	▼3	10.00	7	8	24.24	4,095	17.59	
Liberal Democrats	{{{candidates}}}	1	▼2	10.00	6	7	21.21	3,645	15.66	
Green	{{{candidates}}}	0	Steady	0.00	0	0	0.00	2,038	8.75	
Labour	{{{candidates}}}	0	Steady	0.00	0	0	0.00	1,945	8.36	

== Ward results ==
=== Barnoldswick ===
Barnoldswick
Party	Candidate	Votes	%	±%
Liberal Democrats	Chris Church *	970	40.0	−14.0
Reform	Sean Robertson	889	36.6	N/A
Conservative	Julie Sutcliffe	235	9.7	−18.4
Green	Richard Whiteley	230	9.5	+3.7
Labour	Euan Clouston	103	4.2	−8.0
Majority		81	3.4	−22.5
Rejected ballots		4		
Turnout			36.8	+6.4
Registered electors		6,597		
Liberal Democrats hold		Swing		

=== Barrowford & Pendleside ===
Barrowford & Pendleside
Party	Candidate	Votes	%	±%
Conservative	Martyn Stone *	1,115	36.5	−21.6
Reform	Vanessa Robinson	1,100	36.0	N/A
Labour	Susan Nike	461	15.1	−25.6
Green	Elektra Ellis	273	8.9	N/A
Liberal Democrats	Anthony Chamberlain	105	3.4	N/A
Majority		15	0.5	−16.9
Rejected ballots		6		
Turnout			50.1	+10.2
Registered electors		6,105		
Conservative hold		Swing		

=== Boulsworth & Foulridge ===
Boulsworth & Foulridge
Party	Candidate	Votes	%	±%
Reform	Alan Whitehead	1,151	39.3	N/A
Conservative	Alexander Hustwit	1,048	35.8	−18.8
Green	Lyndsey Taylor	279	9.5	+2.7
Labour	David Johns	230	7.8	−12.5
Liberal Democrats	Patricia Hannah-Wood	223	7.6	−10.6
Majority		103	3.5	
Rejected ballots		2		
Turnout			45.9	+10.5
Registered electors		6,385		
Reform gain from Conservative		Swing		

=== Bradley ===
Bradley
Party	Candidate	Votes	%	±%
Independent	Mohammad Ammer	990	50.2	N/A
Reform	Drew Dixon	365	18.5	N/A
Green	Ryan Brown	192	9.7	N/A
Labour	Muhammad Huzaifa	187	9.5	−39.0
Conservative	Nigel Pearson-Asher	173	8.8	−42.7
Liberal Democrats	Howard Thomas	65	3.3	N/A
Majority		625	31.7	
Rejected ballots		9		
Turnout			32.7	−20.0
Registered electors		6,063		
Independent gain from Conservative		Swing		

=== Brierfield East & Clover Hill ===
Brierfield East & Clover Hill
Party	Candidate	Votes	%	±%
Independent	Sajjad Ahmed *	1,253	53.7	N/A
Reform	John Metcalfe	483	20.7	N/A
Conservative	Pauline McCormick	215	9.2	−35.8
Green	Benjamin Harrop	163	7.0	N/A
Labour	Adam Walsh	155	6.6	−41.7
Liberal Democrats	Mary Thomas	65	2.8	−4.0
Majority		770	33.0	
Rejected ballots		6		
Turnout			39.5	−11.1
Registered electors		5,932		
Independent gain from Labour		Swing		

=== Earby & Coates ===
Earby & Coates
Party	Candidate	Votes	%	±%
Reform	Glenn Whittaker	1,067	38.9	N/A
Liberal Democrats	David Whipp *	1,060	38.6	−18.4
Conservative	Jane Pratt	294	10.7	−23.4
Green	Jane Wood	203	7.4	−1.5
Labour	David Hunter	119	4.3	N/A
Majority		7	0.3	
Rejected ballots		3		
Turnout			42.4	+8.0
Registered electors		6,486		
Reform gain from Liberal Democrats		Swing		

=== Marsden & Southfield ===
Marsden & Southfield
Party	Candidate	Votes	%	±%
Independent	Riaz Bashir	777	38.8	N/A
Reform	Gary Hood	603	30.1	N/A
Conservative	Marie Stone	232	11.6	−25.5
Green	Claire Brightley	167	8.3	+3.6
Labour Co-op	Sheila Wicks	160	8.0	−47.6
Liberal Democrats	Philip Berry	66	3.3	+0.6
Majority		174	8.7	
Rejected ballots		3		
Turnout			33.2	−1.8
Registered electors		6,042		
Independent gain from Labour		Swing		

=== Vivary Bridge ===
Vivary Bridge
Party	Candidate	Votes	%	±%
Reform	Michael Waddington	716	41.4	
Liberal Democrats	Andy Bell *	483	27.9	
Conservative	Karen Clark	310	17.9	
Green	Kelly Whiteside	130	7.5	
Labour	Mark Porter	91	5.3	
Majority		233	13.5	
Rejected ballots		1		
Turnout			32.4	+5.5
Registered electors		5,352		
Reform gain from Liberal Democrats		Swing		

=== Waterside & Horsfield ===
Waterside & Horsfield
Party	Candidate	Votes	%	±%
Reform	Nathan McCollum	798	39.9	N/A
Liberal Democrats	Alice Mann	570	28.5	+0.2
Conservative	Reece Bailey	318	15.9	−30.3
Green	Jacky McGeoch	192	9.6	+3.7
Labour	Philip Heyworth	121	6.1	−13.5
Majority		228	11.4	
Rejected ballots		5		
Turnout			35.7	+6.4
Registered electors		5,613		
Reform gain from Conservative		Swing		

=== Whitefield & Walverden ===
Whitefield & Walverden
Party	Candidate	Votes	%	±%
Independent	Mohammad Sakib	982	47.2	N/A
Labour	Manzar Iqbal	318	15.3	−41.4
Green	Gemma Taylor	209	10.0	+6.4
Reform	Sean Eastwood	208	10.0	N/A
Independent	Ajaz Ditta	171	8.2	N/A
Conservative	Adrian Mitchell	155	7.4	−22.3
Liberal Democrats	David Sparrow	38	1.8	N/A
Majority		664	31.9	
Rejected ballots		13		
Turnout			29.7	−11.7
Registered electors		7,408		
Independent gain from Labour		Swing		
