= Boulsworth =

- Shown within Pendle
- Area: 43.83 km^{2} (16.92 sq mi)
- Population: 5,262 (2011)
  - Density: 120/km^{2} (310/sq mi)
- District: Pendle
- Ceremonial county: Lancashire
- Region: North West
- Country: England
- Sovereign state: United Kingdom
- UK Parliament: Pendle and Clitheroe
- Councillors: George Askew (Conservative); Mike Calvert (Conservative); Paul White (Conservative)

Boulsworth is one of the 20 electoral wards that form the Parliamentary constituency of Pendle, Lancashire, England. The ward represents the area surrounding Boulsworth Hill, including the villages of Trawden, Laneshaw Bridge and Wycoller, and returns three councillors to sit on Pendle Borough Council. As of the May 2011 Council election, Boulsworth had an electorate of 4,217.

== Demographics ==
Boulsworth has a lower-than-average percentage of residents aged under 16 compared to both Pendle and England; its population has an average age of 39.7 years. The ward also has a considerably higher proportion (98.6 per cent) of white residents than the local and national averages.

== Election results ==
Year elected	Councillor	Majority	%
2008	Mike Calvert (Conservative)	183	5.0
2010	George Askew (Conservative)	822	26.5
2011	Paul White (Conservative)	488	26.1
