= Nelson Town Hall =

Municipal building in Nelson, Lancashire, England

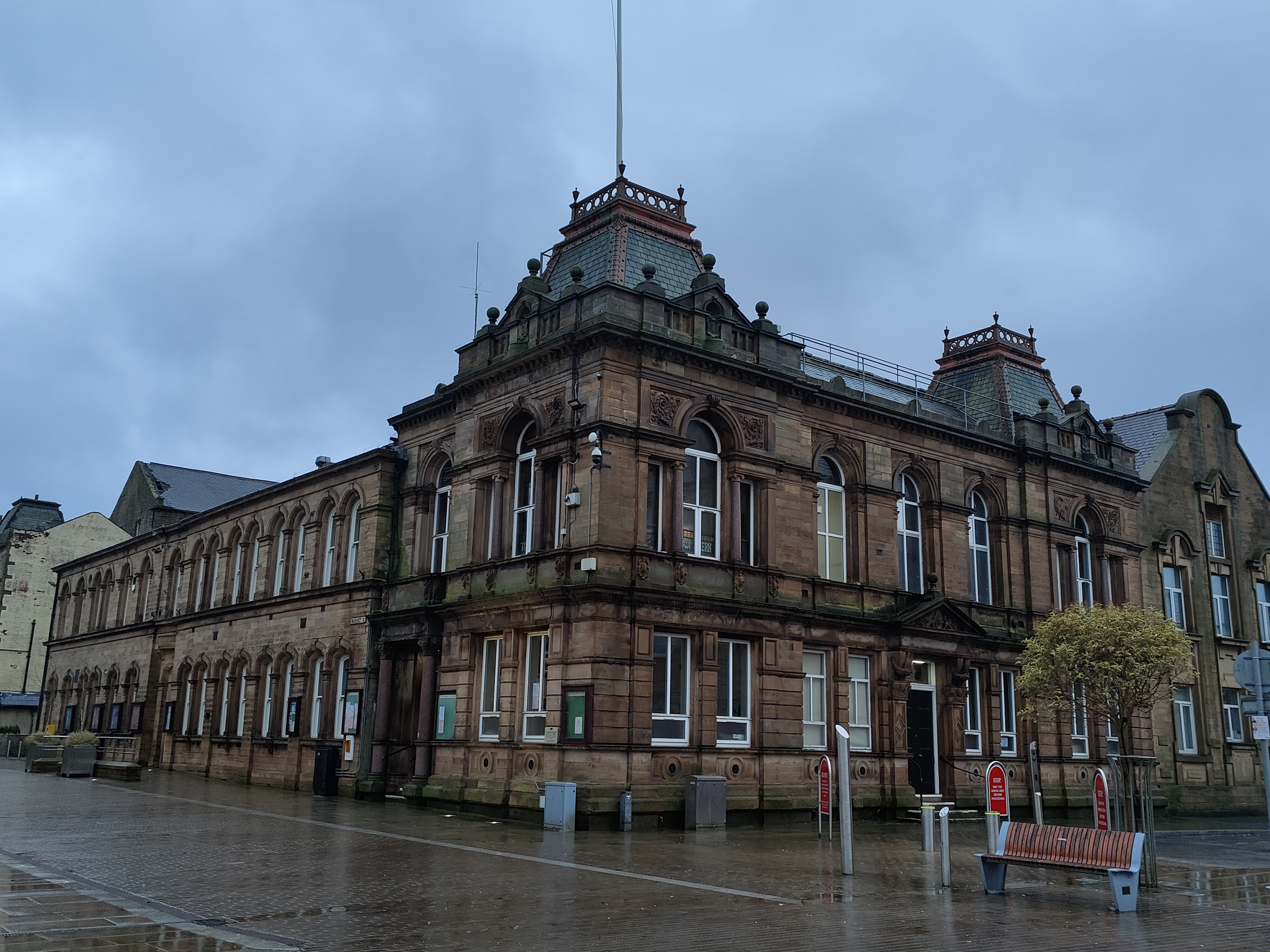
- Nelson Town Hall

- Shown in Lancashire Location in Borough of Pendle
- 53.8371°N 2.2159°W
- Location: Market Square, Nelson

History
- Built: 1881

Site notes
- Architect: Alfred Waterhouse
- Architectural style: Renaissance style with Gothic features
- Website: www.pendle.gov.uk

Nelson Town Hall is a municipal building in Market Square, Nelson, Lancashire, England. The building is the headquarters for both Pendle Borough Council and Nelson Town Council.

== History ==
After significant population growth associated with the increasing number of cotton mills in the area, a local board of health was appointed to manage public services in the town in 1864. In this context the local board decided to procure some municipal offices: the site they chose had previously been open land on the north west side of the Long Preston trust road (now Scotland Road).

The new building was designed by Alfred Waterhouse in the Renaissance style with Gothic features, built in ashlar stone and was completed in 1881. The design involved a symmetrical main frontage with five bays facing onto the Market Square with the end bays slightly projected forward as pavilions; the central section of three bays featured a doorway flanked by carved pilasters supporting an entablature, a pediment containing a carved coat of arms in the tympanum and a ball-shaped finial at its apex. There were rounded headed windows on the first floor with stone surrounds flanked by pilasters with prominent mansard roofs at the corners. Internally, the principal rooms were the council chamber and the mayor's parlour. Pevsner was clearly unimpressed by the position of the town hall in the Market Square and commented on "what a depressing square it is."

The town was advanced to the status of municipal borough with the municipal offices becoming a town hall in 1890. A procession through the town, which started at the town hall, was organised to celebrate the event. An hour bell, designed and cast by John Taylor & Co of Loughborough, was installed in the town hall in 1904.

The building continued to serve as the headquarters of the local borough council for much of the 20th century and remained the local seat of government after the enlarged Pendle Borough Council was formed in 1974. Following its formation in May 2008, the town hall also became the regular meeting place of Nelson Town Council.

== See also ==
- List of city and town halls in England
