= Harold Whalley =

English footballer

Personal information
- Date of birth: 4 April 1923
- Place of birth: Nelson, England
- Date of death: 1 January 1997 (aged 73)
- Place of death: Burnley, England
- Position: Left winger

Senior career*
Years	Team	Apps	(Gls)
1946–1947	Accrington Stanley	3	(0)
1947–1949	Barnoldswick Town	24	(10)
Total		27	(10)
- * Club domestic league appearances and goals

Harold Whalley (4 April 1923 – 1 January 1997) was an English professional footballer who played in the Football League as a left winger. He was born in Nelson and played for the Nelson under 18s winning the U-18s League 2. However, he was not satisfied with Nelson and signed for Accrington Stanley. He made his first team debut in a 1–0 loss to Northampton Town and only made 3 appearances in a year. He then moved to non-league side Barnoldswick Town and instantly became a favourite with the fans, netting 5 in his first five appearances but an injury ruled him out. He only played until the next season, when he netted a hattrick that replenished Barnoldswick's survival hopes in that league. They did stay in the division but Whalley decided to retire. However, he did become head coach at Brierfield Central and guided them to a third successive title a well as the Morrison Cup. He died, aged 73, at his home in Burnley.
