= Clover Hill (Brookeville, Maryland) =

Historic house in Maryland, United States

- U.S. National Register of Historic Places
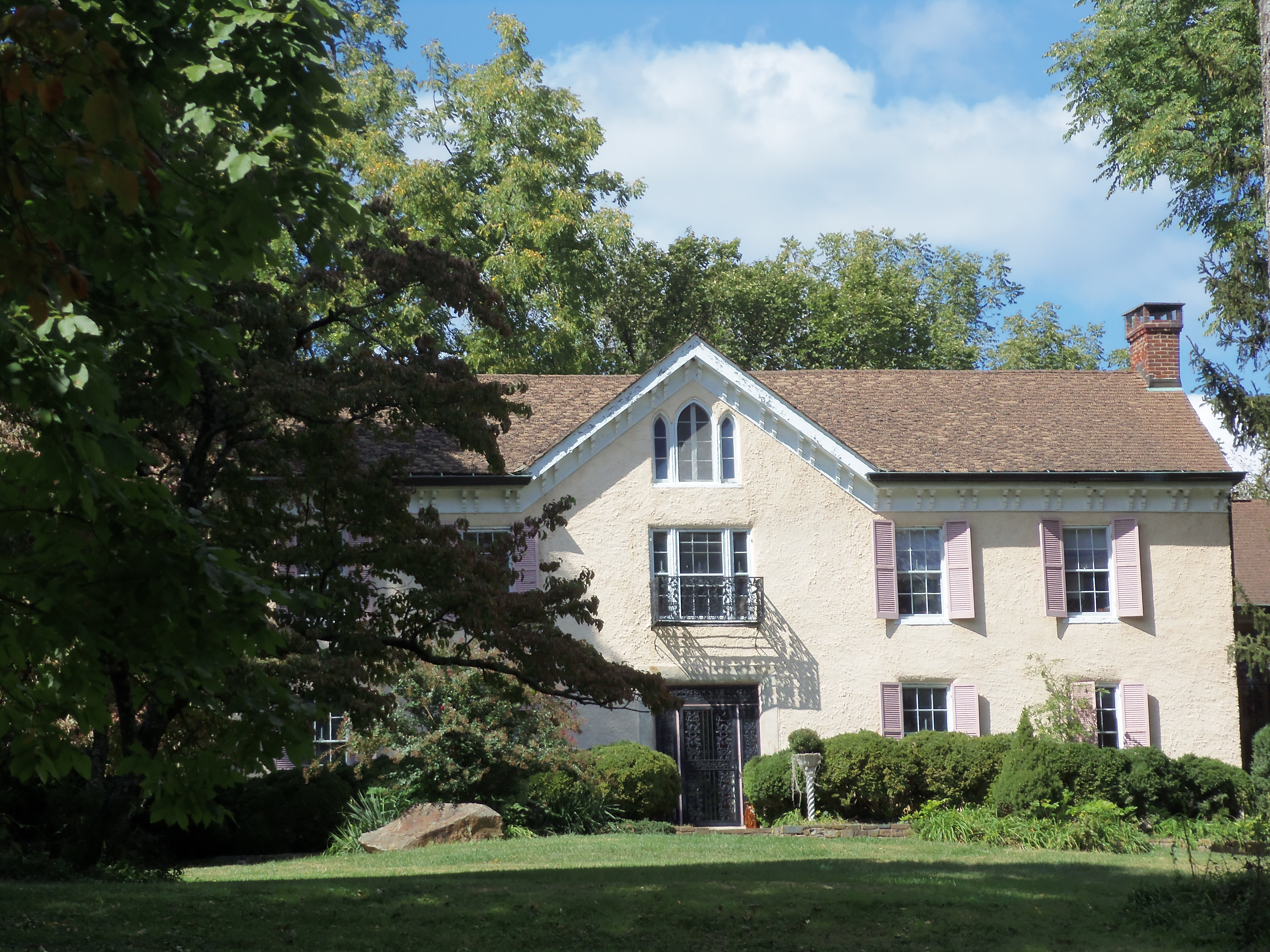
- September 2012

- Location within Maryland Location within the United States
- Location: 21310 Zion Rd., Brookeville, Maryland
- Coordinates: 39°12′26″N 77°5′41″W
- Area: 12.1 acres (4.9 ha)
- Built: 1764-1857
- NRHP reference No.: 82002817
- Added to NRHP: July 20, 1982

Clover Hill is a historic home located at Brookeville, Montgomery County, Maryland, United States. It is a large, 2 1/2-story, five bay Italianate-style residence originally constructed as a log cabin in the 1760s, then reconstructed as a stone farmhouse in the 1790s, and then rebuilt in the current form in 1857. Evidence of the earlier building campaigns are still visible. The ruins of a large bank barn and a stone springhouse stand on the property. The house was built by Ephraim Gaither, a Maryland legislator (1817–1820) and locally prominent citizen.

Clover Hill was listed on the National Register of Historic Places in 1982.
