= Brierfield Swifts F.C. =

- Full name: Brierfield Swifts Football Club
- Founded: 1907
- Dissolved: 1910

Brierfield Swifts Football Club was an English association football club based in Brierfield, Lancashire. The team entered the FA Cup, the major English cup competition, for the first time in the 1907–08 but were knocked out in the preliminary round, losing 1–7 away at Rossendale United. In the next two years, Brierfield were beaten at the same stage by Darwen and Nelson. The team's furthest progression in the tournament occurred during their last entry into the Cup in 1910–11, when they defeated Padiham before losing to Haslingden in the first qualifying round.

== FA Cup results ==
Date	Round	Opponents	H/A	Result
21 September 1907	Preliminary Round	Rossendale United	Away	1–7
19 September 1908	Preliminary Round	Darwen	Away	1–4
18 September 1909	Preliminary Round	Nelson	Home	2–3
17 September 1910	Preliminary Round	Padiham	Home	2–1
1 October 1910	First Qualifying Round	Haslingden	Home	1–5
