= Cloverhill, New Jersey =

Unincorporated community in New Jersey, US

- Unincorporated community
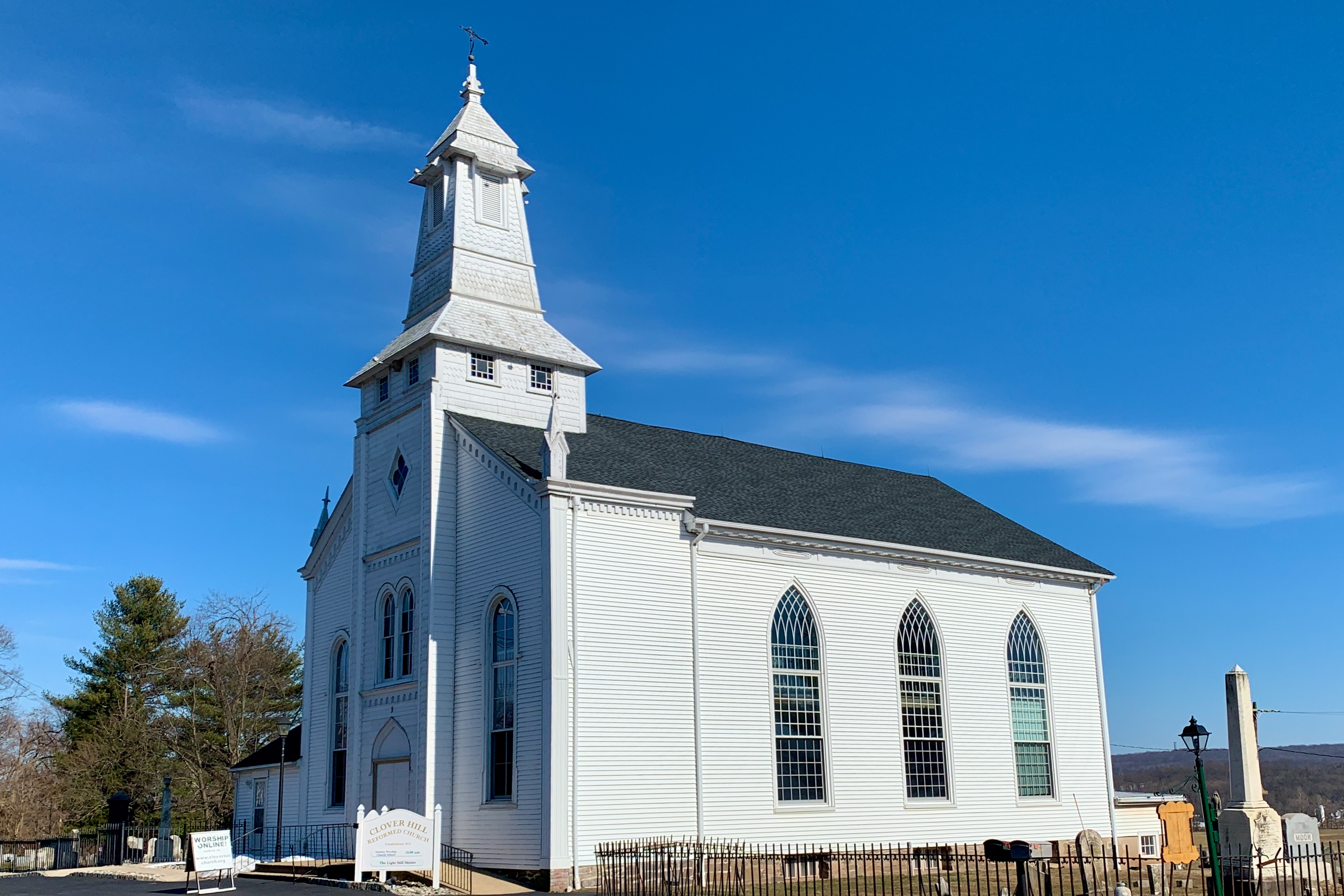
- Clover Hill Reformed Church

- Location within Hunterdon County, New Jersey Location within New Jersey Location within the United States
- Coordinates: 40°29′17″N 74°46′56″W
- Country: United States
- State: New Jersey
- County: Hunterdon and Somerset
- Township: East Amwell, Raritan and Hillsborough
- Named for: Peter Clover
- Elevation: 187 ft (57 m)
- GNIS feature ID: 875522

Cloverhill (or Clover Hill) is an unincorporated community located at the intersection of the boundaries of East Amwell and Raritan townships in Hunterdon County and Hillsborough Township in Somerset County, in the U.S. state of New Jersey. The Clover Hill Historic District was listed on the state and national registers of historic places in 1980.

== History ==
John Bennett purchased several hundred acres of land here in 1683. The Clover Hill Reformed Church was built in 1834 as a Dutch Reformed Church. By the late 19th century, the community had a hotel, store, church, blacksmith and post office. The community is named after Peter Clover, a blacksmith who worked across from the church.

== Historic district ==
- Clover Hill Historic District
- U.S. National Register of Historic Places
- U.S. Historic district
- New Jersey Register of Historic Places
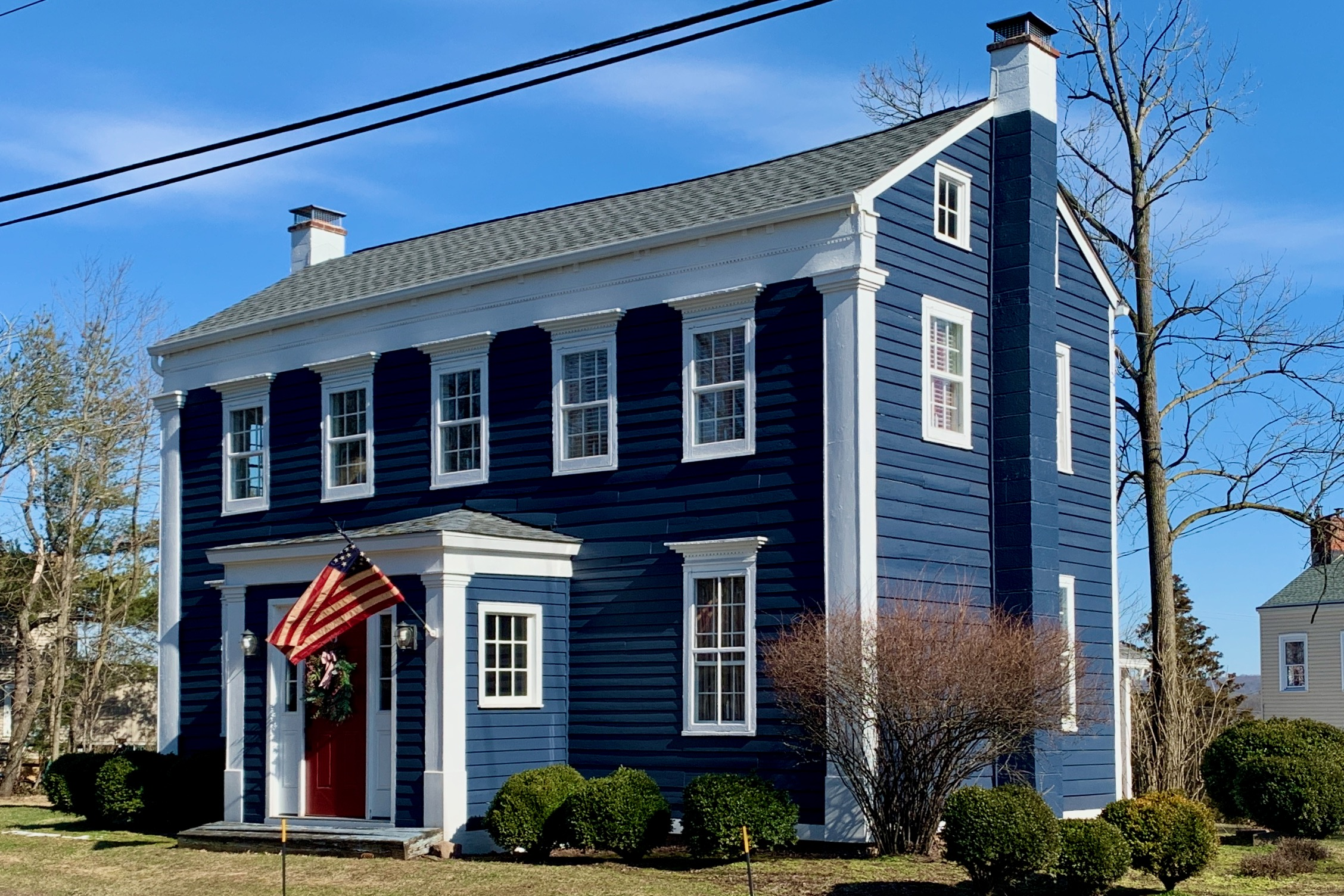
- J. B. French House
- Location: Amwell and Wertsville-Clover Hill Roads
- Area: 25.6 acres (10.4 ha)
- Architectural style: Greek Revival, Late Victorian, Gothic Revival
- NRHP reference No.: 80002492
- NJRHP No.: 2511

Significant dates
- Added to NRHP: September 29, 1980
- Designated NJRHP: October 16, 1979

The Clover Hill Historic District is a 25.6-acre (10.4 ha) historic district encompassing the community along Amwell and Wertsville-Clover Hill Roads. It was added to the National Register of Historic Places on September 29, 1980, for its significance in religion and exploration/settlement. The district includes 21 contributing buildings.

The Clover Hill Reformed Church features short spires on the corners in the Gothic Revival style. The steeple was replaced in 1885 after having been blown down. The J. B. French House was built in 1873 with Greek Revival style. The E. Bartow Farm / John Cruser House was built in three stages, starting c. 1840. It features knee wall windows on the third floor.

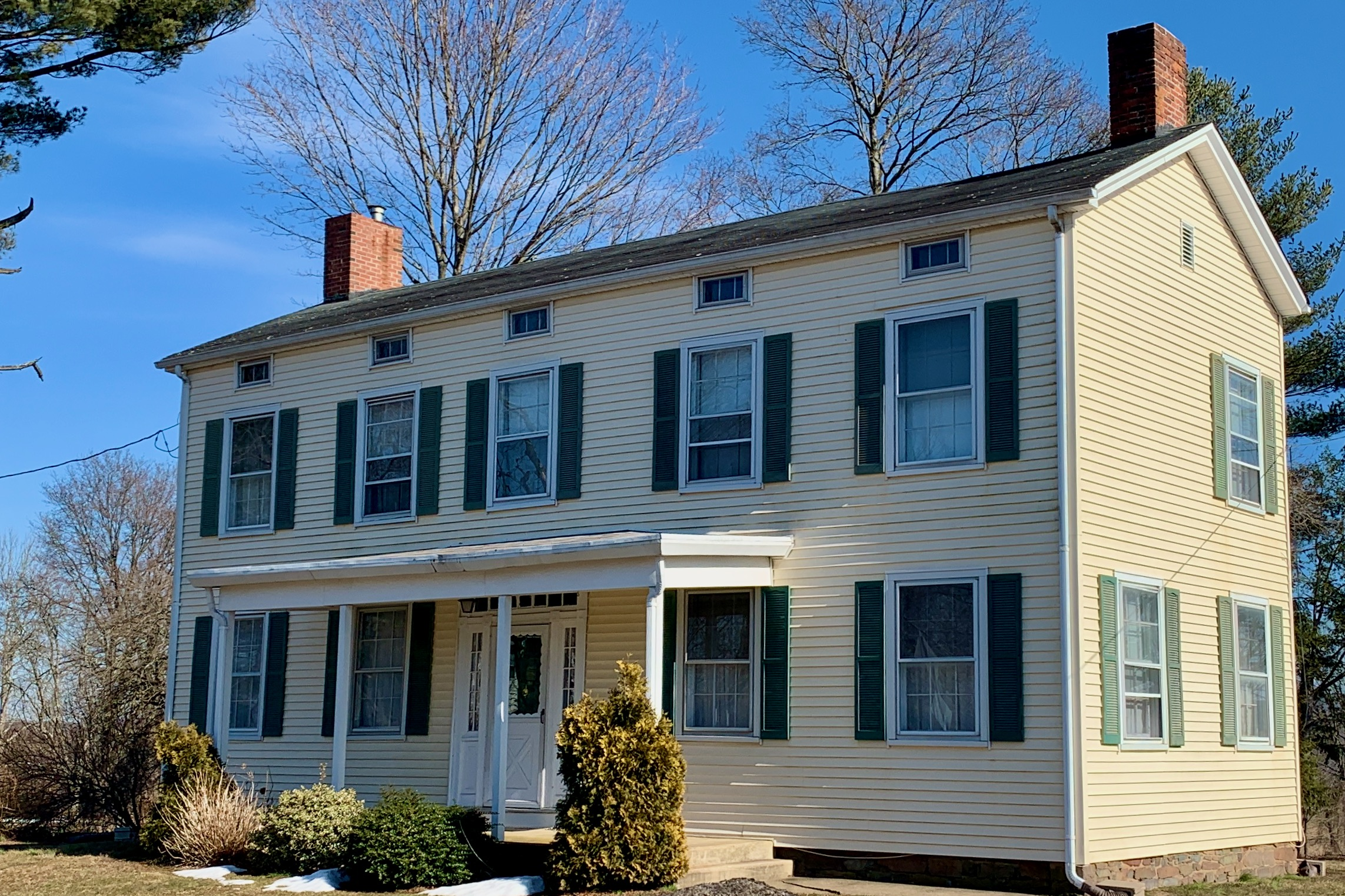
E. Bartow Farm / John Cruser House
