= 2011 Pendle Borough Council election =

2011 UK local government election

Map of the results of the 2011 Pendle Borough Council election. Conservatives in blue, Labour in red and Liberal Democrats in yellow. Wards in dark grey were not contested in 2011.

The 2011 Pendle Borough Council election took place on 5 May 2011 to elect members of Pendle Borough Council in Lancashire, England. One third of the council was up for election and the council stayed under no overall control.

After the election, the composition of the council was

- Conservative 18
- Labour 16
- Liberal Democrats 12
- British National Party 2
- Independent 1

== Background ==
Before the election there were 17 Conservatives, 16 Liberal Democrats, 13 Labour, 2 British National Party and 1 independent councillors. At the last election in 2010 the Liberal Democrats lost the leadership of the council and an agreement between the Conservative and Labour parties took control of the council, with Conservative Mike Blomeley becoming leader of the council, after attempts at forming an all party cabinet failed. However Labour withdrew from the agreement with the Conservatives in February 2011.

17 seats were contested at the election, with 6 sitting councillors standing down, Martin Bell from Craven ward, Carol Belshaw from Foulridge ward, Gary Bird from Clover Hill ward, Allan Buck from Coates ward, Sonia Robinson from Southfield ward and Violet Vaughan from Boulsworth ward.

== Election result ==
After having run the council until the 2010 election, the Liberal Democrats fell to third on the council with 12 seats, behind the Conservatives on 18 seats and Labour on 16 seats. The Liberal Democrats lost 4 seats, Craven and Vivary Bridge to the Conservatives, and Clover Hill and Southfield to Labour, with the Liberal Democrat leader on the council John David holding his seat in Old Laund Booth by only 10 votes. Labour picked up 3 seats, taking Reedley from the Conservatives, in addition to the party's 2 gains from the Liberal Democrats, while the Conservatives ended up with 1 extra seat on the council. Overall turnout at the election was 43.7%.

Following the election, Conservative Mike Blomeley remained as leader of the council with an all Conservative cabinet, meanwhile Liberal Democrat Nadeem Ahmed became the youngest mayor of Pendle at the age of 32.

Pendle local election result 2011
Party	Seats	Gains	Losses	Net gain/loss	Seats %	Votes %	Votes	+/−
Conservative	8	2	1	+1	47.1	41.2	10,577	+7.1%
Labour	5	3	0	+3	29.4	37.2	9,551	+9.2%
Liberal Democrats	4	0	4	-4	23.5	18.0	4,618	-11.3%
BNP	0	0	0	0	0	1.8	452	-6.2%
English Democrat	0	0	0	0	0	1.0	263	+1.0%
England First	0	0	0	0	0	0.7	172	+0.0%
UKIP	0	0	0	0	0	0.2	62	+0.2%

== Ward results ==
Barrowford
Party	Candidate	Votes	%	±%
Conservative	Linda Crossley	1,045	57.8	+2.8
Labour	Sue Nike	763	42.2	+10.3
Majority		282	15.6	−7.5
Turnout		1,808	45.0	−25.3
Conservative hold		Swing		

Blacko and Higherford
Party	Candidate	Votes	%	±%
Conservative	Shelagh Derwent	583	79.8	+0.0
Labour	John Pope	148	20.2	+8.9
Majority		435	59.5	−9.0
Turnout		731	49.7	+0.2
Conservative hold		Swing		

Boulsworth
Party	Candidate	Votes	%	±%
Conservative	Paul White	1,000	53.6	+5.6
Labour	Julian Jordan	512	27.4	+6.5
Liberal Democrats	James Kerrigan	355	19.0	−2.5
Majority		488	26.1	−0.4
Turnout		1,867	44.7	−29.5
Conservative hold		Swing		

Bradley
Party	Candidate	Votes	%	±%
Labour	Nadeem Younis	1,339	70.5	+22.1
Conservative	Tim Eyre	218	11.5	−1.8
England First	David Geddes	172	9.1	−0.6
Liberal Democrats	Kenneth Massey	171	9.0	−19.5
Majority		1,121	59.0	+39.1
Turnout		1,900	41.7	−20.4
Labour hold		Swing		

Brierfield
Party	Candidate	Votes	%	±%
Labour	Nawaz Ahmed	1,161	64.1	+21,3
Conservative	Jack Gregory	650	35.9	+7.7
Majority		511	28.2	+13.6
Turnout		1,811	49.0	−24.4
Labour hold		Swing		

Clover Hill
Party	Candidate	Votes	%	±%
Labour	Richard Smith	775	51.4	+19.1
Conservative	Janice Taylor	358	23.8	−0.6
Liberal Democrats	James Wood	213	14.1	−15.8
BNP	Julie Fairless	161	10.7	−2.7
Majority		417	27.7	+25.3
Turnout		1,507	40.3	−23.6
Labour gain from Liberal Democrats		Swing		

Coates
Party	Candidate	Votes	%	±%
Liberal Democrats	Janine Throupe	775	45.5	+0.1
Conservative	Stephanie Clarke	593	34.8	+2.3
Labour	Ian Tweedie	336	19.7	+7.7
Majority		182	10.7	−2.3
Turnout		1,704	41.7	−26.4
Liberal Democrats hold		Swing		

Craven
Party	Candidate	Votes	%	±%
Conservative	Jennifer Purcell	768	42.5	+1.8
Liberal Democrats	David Stead	719	39.8	−7.8
Labour	Bill Roberts	321	17.8	+6.1
Majority		49	2.7	
Turnout		1,808	42.7	−25.5
Conservative gain from Liberal Democrats		Swing		

Earby
Party	Candidate	Votes	%	±%
Conservative	Morris Horsfield	1,145	53.7	2.8
Labour	Hazel Rycroft	513	24.1	+9.7
English Democrat	James Jackman	263	12.3	+12.3
Liberal Democrats	Jackie Taylforth	210	9.9	−10.9
Majority		632	29.7	−0.4
Turnout		2,131	44.6	−24.6
Conservative hold		Swing		

Foulridge
Party	Candidate	Votes	%	±%
Conservative	Graham Waugh	551	78.7	+22.6
Labour	Denzil Metcalfe	149	21.3	+13.4
Majority		402	57.4	+23.0
Turnout		700	51.6	+6.9
Conservative hold		Swing		

Higham and Pendleside
Party	Candidate	Votes	%	±%
Conservative	James Starkie	625	80.4	+18.0
Labour	Robert Oliver	152	19.6	+13.7
Majority		473	60.9	+30.2
Turnout		777	56.1	−4.8
Conservative hold		Swing		

Horsfield
Party	Candidate	Votes	%	±%
Liberal Democrats	Anne Kerrigan	555	37.9	+3.9
Conservative	Rachel Pearson	490	33.4	−1.2
Labour	David Foat	421	28.7	+10.5
Majority		65	4.4	
Turnout		1,466	37.2	−22.9
Liberal Democrats hold		Swing		

Old Laund Booth
Party	Candidate	Votes	%	±%
Liberal Democrats	John David	367	48.5	−17.5
Conservative	Jill Hartley	357	47.2	+16.9
Labour	Peter Maltby	32	4.2	+0.5
Majority		10	1.3	−34.4
Turnout		756	61.3	+3.2
Liberal Democrats hold		Swing		

Reedley
Party	Candidate	Votes	%	±%
Labour	Robert Allen	1,218	53.4	+25.7
Conservative	Tonia Barton	1,062	46.6	−2.6
Majority		156	6.8	
Turnout		2,280	54.8	−17.9
Labour gain from Conservative		Swing		

Southfield
Party	Candidate	Votes	%	±%
Labour	David Whalley	866	53.9	+15.8
Conservative	Paul McKenna	363	22.6	−7.7
Liberal Democrats	Judith Robinson	204	12.7	−18.9
BNP	Lee Karmer	112	7.0	+7.0
UKIP	John Banks	62	3.9	+3.9
Majority		503	31.3	+24.8
Turnout		1,607	40.2	−19.6
Labour gain from Liberal Democrats		Swing		

Vivary Bridge
Party	Candidate	Votes	%	±%
Conservative	Joe Cooney	555	37.9	+8.7
Labour	Anthony Hargreaves	464	31.7	+10.6
Liberal Democrats	Howard Thomas	444	30.3	−3.9
Majority		91	6.2	
Turnout		1,463	35.9	−23.7
Conservative gain from Liberal Democrats		Swing		

Waterside
Party	Candidate	Votes	%	±%
Liberal Democrats	Graham Roach	605	43.9	−0.2
Labour	David Johns	381	27.6	+8.3
Conservative	Maureen Regan	214	15.5	−6.3
BNP	John Rowe	179	13.0	−1.7
Majority		224	16.2	−6.1
Turnout		1,379	36.2	−21.9
Liberal Democrats hold		Swing		
