= Pendle Borough Council =

Non-metropolitan district council in Lancashire, England

Type
- Type: Non-metropolitan district

History
- Founded: 1 April 1974

Leadership
- Mayor: Nadeem Ahmed, Independent since 21 May 2026
- Leader: Asjad Mahmood, Independent since 21 May 2026
- Chief Executive: Dean Langton since October 2025

Structure
- Seats: 33 councillors
- Graph of the party split among 33 seats.
- Political groups: Administration (18) Liberal Democrats (7) Independent (11) Other parties (15) Conservative (8) Reform (5) Independent (2)

Elections
- Voting system: First past the post
- Last election: 7 May 2026

Meeting place
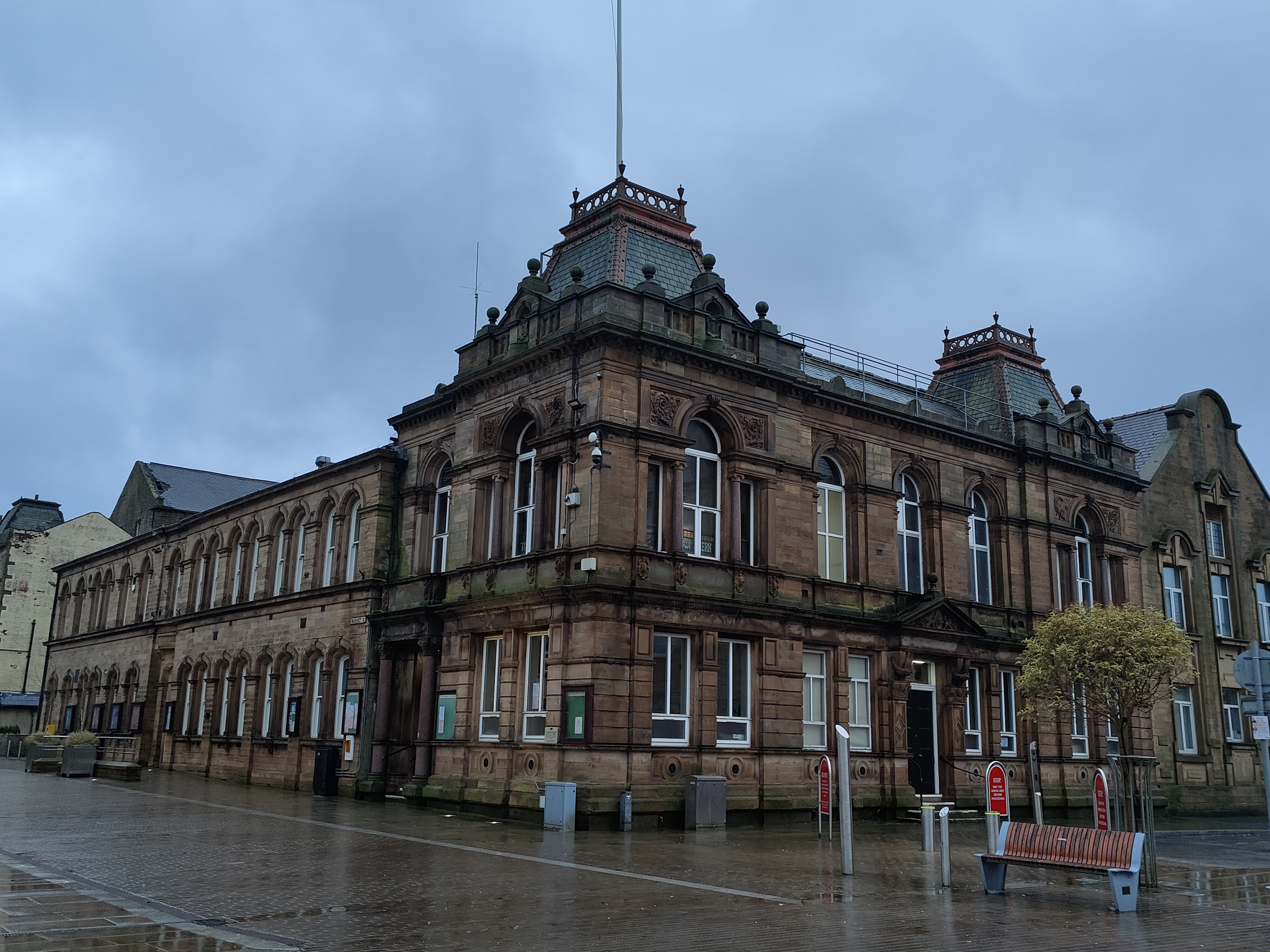
- Town Hall, Market Street, Nelson, BB9 7LG

Website
- www.pendle.gov.uk

Pendle Borough Council provides district-level services for the Borough of Pendle, in Lancashire, in North West England. County-level services are provided by Lancashire County Council. The whole borough is also covered by civil parishes, which form a third tier of local government.

== History ==
The borough and its council were created in 1974 under the Local Government Act 1972.

In March 2013, Brian Cookson retired from his position as Executive Director for Regeneration, a post he had held for nine years, in parallel with that of President of British Cycling from 2007 onwards. He subsequently became the President of the Union Cycliste Internationale (UCI), the world governing body for sports cycling from 2013-2017.

In June 2017, a Conservative councilor, Rosemary Carroll, was suspended after sending a racist post on social media comparing Asians to dogs. This controversy expanded after the local elections in 2018, when the councilor was readmitted into the Conservative Party, allowing the Conservative party to gain a majority on the council. The Pendle Labour party accused the Pendle Conservative Party of condoning racism after the reinstatement. The Shadow Minister for Women and Equalities, Dawn Butler, called upon the Conservative Party Chairman, Brandon Lewis, to issue a statement saying that the councillor in question would not be part of the Conservative group on the council. This followed a statement from Lewis congratulating the Pendle Conservatives on winning a majority on the council.

In April 2024, all of Labour's 11 borough councillors in Pendle, including the leader of the council, quit the party.

=== Political control ===
The council has been under no overall control since the 2023 election.

The first election to the council was held in 1973, initially operating as a shadow authority alongside the outgoing authorities until the new arrangements came into effect on 1 April 1974. Political control of the council since 1974 has been as follows:

Party in control	Years
No overall control	1974–1976
Conservative	1976–1979
No overall control	1979–1987
Liberal Democrats	1987–1990
No overall control	1990–1991
Labour	1991–1994
No overall control	1994–1995
Liberal Democrats	1995–1999
No overall control	1999–2004
Liberal Democrats	2004–2008
No overall control	2008–2018
Conservative	2018–2019
No overall control	2019–2021
Conservative	2021–2023
No overall control	2023–present

=== Leadership ===
The role of mayor is largely ceremonial in Pendle. Political leadership is instead provided by the leader of the council. The leaders since 2010 have been:

Councillor	Party	From	To
Mike Blomeley	Conservative	20 May 2010	May 2012
Joe Cooney	Conservative	May 2012	2015
Mohammed Iqbal	Labour	May 2015	May 2018
Paul White	Conservative	17 May 2018	May 2019
Mohammed Iqbal	Labour	16 May 2019	May 2021
Nadeem Ahmed	Conservative	20 May 2021	May 2023
Asjad Mahmood	Labour	18 May 2023	1 Apr 2024
Asjad Mahmood	Independent	1 Apr 2024	May 2025
David Whipp	Liberal Democrats	15 May 2025	May 2026
Asjad Mahmood	Independent	May 2026	

=== Composition ===
Following the 2026 election, the composition of the council was:

Party	Seats
Conservative	8
Liberal Democrats	7
Reform	5
Independent	13
Total	33

Eleven of the independent councillors sit as the "Pendle Community Independents" group, which forms the council's administration with the Liberal Democrats. The other two independents form the "Pendle's True Independents" group. The next election is scheduled for 2027.

=== Premises ===
The council meets at Nelson Town Hall on Market Street in the centre of Nelson, which had been completed in 1881 for the old Nelson Local Board, predecessor of the Nelson Borough Council created in 1890. It has its main administrative offices in a modern building at Number One Market Street, opposite the town hall.

== Elections ==
Since the last full review of boundaries took effect in 2021 the council has comprised 33 councillors representing 12 wards, with each ward electing one, two or three councillors. Elections are held three years out of every four, with roughly a third of the council being elected each time for a four-year term. Lancashire County Council elections are held in the fourth year of the cycle when there are no borough council elections.

=== Wider politics ===
The Pendle constituency was represented in Parliament by the Conservative Member of Parliament, Andrew Stephenson, from 2010-2024.

From the 2024 General Election, the constituency no longer covers the same area as the borough and is now represented by two MPs, Jonathan Hinder the Labour member for Pendle and Clitheroe and Oliver David Ryan the MP for Burnley, whose constituency includes parts of Reedley and Brierfield, which are in Pendle.
