= Alcohol (drug) =

Active ingredient in fermented drinks

Ethanol

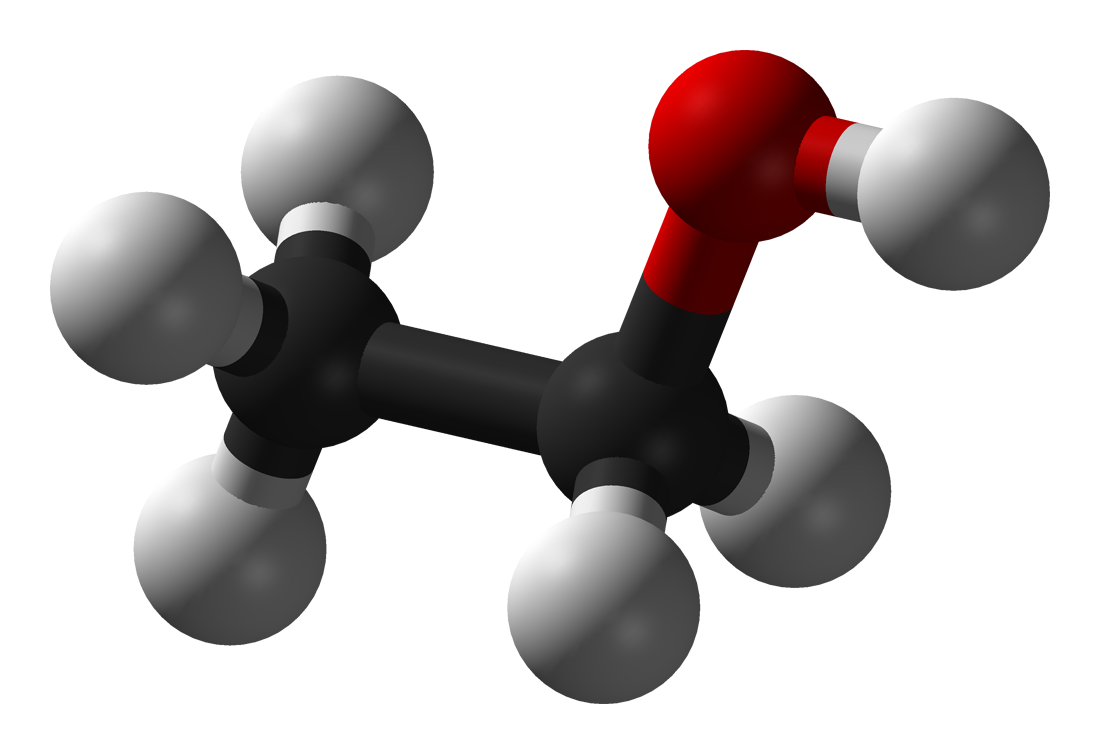

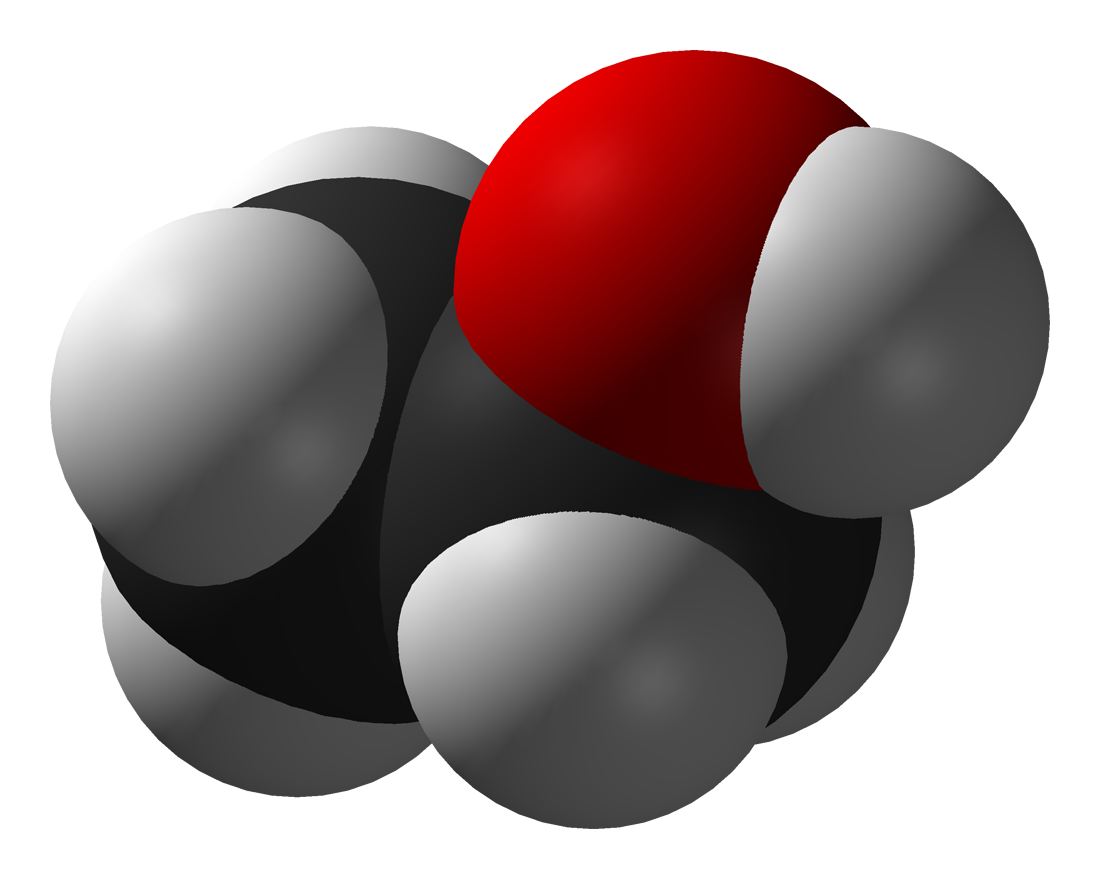

Clinical data
- Pronunciation: /ˈɛθənɒl/
- Other names: Absolute alcohol; alcohol (USP); cologne spirit; drinking alcohol; ethanol (JAN); ethylic alcohol; EtOH; ethyl alcohol; ethyl hydrate; ethyl hydroxide; ethylol; grain alcohol; hydroxyethane; methylcarbinol
- Pregnancy category: X (Contraindicated in pregnancy)
- Dependence liability: Moderate
- Addiction liability: Moderate (10–15%)
- Routes of administration: Common: By mouth Uncommon: Inhalation, ophthalmic, insufflation, rectal, injection
- Drug class: Depressant; anxiolytic; analgesic; euphoriant; sedative; emetic; diuretic; general anesthetic
- ATC code: V03AZ01 (WHO)

Legal status
- Legal status: AU: Unscheduled; BR: Unscheduled; CA: Unscheduled; DE: Unscheduled; NZ: Unscheduled; UK: General sales list (GSL, OTC); US: Unscheduled; UN: Unscheduled; SE: Age-restricted (Note: The minimum age to purchase alcoholic beverages above 3,5% alcohol by volume for off-premises consumption is 20, while the minimum age to be served alcoholic beverages is 18. The minimum age to purchase "folköl" beer containing more than 2,25% but no more than 3,5% alcohol by volume is 18. Drinks containing no more than 2,25% alcohol by volume are not subject to the statutory age restriction.); In general: Legal for recreational use, except in Muslim countries of the Middle East and parts of North Africa and South Asia

Pharmacokinetic data
- Bioavailability: 80%+
- Protein binding: Weakly or not at all
- Metabolism: Liver (90%): • Alcohol dehydrogenase • MEOS (CYP2E1)
- Metabolites: Acetaldehyde; acetic acid; acetyl-CoA; carbon dioxide; water; ethyl glucuronide; ethyl sulfate
- Onset of action: Peak concentrations: • Range: 30–90 minutes • Mean: 45–60 minutes • Fasting: 30 minutes
- Elimination half-life: Constant-rate elimination at typical concentrations: • Range: 10–34 mg/dL/hour • Mean: 15-18 mg/dL/hr; At very high concentrations (t_{1/2}): 4.0–4.5 hours
- Duration of action: 6–16 hours (amount of time that levels are detectable)
- Excretion: • Major: metabolism (into carbon dioxide and water) • Minor: urine, breath, sweat (5–10%)

Identifiers
- IUPAC name: ethanol
- CAS Number: 64-17-5
- PubChem CID: 702
- IUPHAR/BPS: 2299
- DrugBank: DB00898
- ChemSpider: 682
- UNII: 3K9958V90M
- KEGG: D00068
- ChEBI: CHEBI:16236
- ChEMBL: ChEMBL545
- PDB ligand: EOH (PDBe, RCSB PDB)

Chemical and physical data
- Formula: C_{2}H_{6}O
- Molar mass: 46.069 g·mol^{−1}
- 3D model (JSmol): Interactive image
- Density: 0.7893 g/cm^{3} (at 20 °C)
- Melting point: −114.14 ± 0.03 °C (−173.45 ± 0.05 °F)
- Boiling point: 78.24 ± 0.09 °C (172.83 ± 0.16 °F)
- Solubility in water: Miscible mg/mL (20 °C)
- SMILES: CCO
- InChI: InChI=1S/C2H6O/c1-2-3/h3H,2H2,1H3; Key:LFQSCWFLJHTTHZ-UHFFFAOYSA-N

Alcohol, sometimes referred to by the chemical name ethanol, is the active ingredient in alcoholic drinks such as beer, wine, and distilled spirits (hard liquor). Alcohol is a central nervous system (CNS) depressant, decreasing electrical activity of neurons in the brain, which causes the characteristic effects of alcohol intoxication ("drunkenness"). Among other effects, alcohol produces euphoria, decreased anxiety, increased sociability, sedation, and impairment of cognitive, memory, motor, and sensory function.

Alcohol has a variety of adverse effects. Short-term adverse effects include generalized impairment of neurocognitive function, dizziness, nausea, vomiting, and symptoms of hangover. Alcohol is addictive and can result in alcohol use disorder, dependence, and withdrawal upon cessation. The long-term effects of alcohol are considered to be a major global public health issue and include liver disease, hepatitis, cardiovascular disease (e.g., cardiomyopathy), polyneuropathy, alcoholic hallucinosis, long-term impact on the brain (e.g., brain damage, dementia, and Marchiafava–Bignami disease), and cancers; alcohol and some of its metabolites (such as acetaldehyde) are IARC group 1 carcinogens. The adverse effects of alcohol on health are most significant when it is used in excessive quantities or with heavy frequency. However, in 2023, the World Health Organization published a statement in The Lancet Public Health that concluded, "no safe amount of alcohol consumption for cancers and health can be established". In high amounts, alcohol may cause loss of consciousness or, in severe cases, death. Many governmental agencies and organizations issue alcohol consumption recommendations.

Alcohol has been produced and consumed by humans for its psychoactive effects since at least 13,000 years ago, when the earliest known beer was brewed by the Natufian culture in the Middle East. Alcohol is the second-most consumed psychoactive drug globally, behind caffeine, with global sales of alcoholic beverages exceeding US$1.5 trillion in 2017. Drinking alcohol is generally socially acceptable and is legal in most countries, unlike with many other recreational substances. However, there are often restrictions on alcohol sale and use, for instance a minimum age for drinking and laws against public drinking and drinking and driving. Alcohol has considerable societal and cultural significance and has important social roles in much of the world. Drinking establishments, such as bars and nightclubs, revolve primarily around the sale and consumption of alcoholic beverages, and parties, festivals, and social gatherings commonly involve alcohol consumption. Alcohol is related to various societal problems, including drunk driving, accidental injuries, sexual assaults, domestic abuse, and violent crime. Alcohol remains illegal for sale and consumption in a number of countries, mainly in the Middle East. While some religions, including Islam, prohibit alcohol consumption, other religions, such as Christianity and Shinto, utilize alcohol in sacrament and libation.

== Uses ==
=== Recreational ===
Ethanol is commonly consumed as the recreational active substance of alcoholic beverages such as beer, wine, and spirits. Consumption in social settings may enhance sociability. While research on the societal benefits of alcohol is rare, in a study from the UK, regular but moderate drinking was correlated with happiness, feeling that life was worthwhile, and satisfaction with life. Community pubs had less variation in visible group sizes and longer, more focused conversations than those in city centre bars. Drinking regularly at a community pub led to higher trust in others and better networking with the local community, compared to non-drinkers and city centre bar drinkers. However, according to a causal path analysis, alcohol consumption was not the cause, but rather satisfaction with life resulted in greater happiness and an inclination to visit pubs and develop a regular drinking venue.

=== Food energy ===
The US Department of Agriculture (USDA) uses a figure of 6.93 kilocalories (29.0 kJ) per gram of alcohol (5.47 kcal or 22.9 kJ per mL) for calculating food energy. For distilled spirits, a standard serving in the United States is 44 mL (1.5 US fl oz), which at 40% ethanol (80 proof), would be 14 grams and 98 calories. Alcoholic drinks are considered empty calorie foods because other than food energy they contribute no essential nutrients. However, alcohol is a significant source of food energy for individuals with alcoholism and those who engage in binge drinking. For example, individuals with drunkorexia engage in the combination of self-imposed malnutrition and binge drinking. In alcoholics who get most of their daily calories from alcohol, a deficiency of thiamine (vitamin B_{1}) can produce Korsakoff syndrome, which is associated with serious brain damage.

=== Medical ===
When fomepizole is not available, ethanol can be used to treat or prevent methanol or ethylene glycol poisoning. The rate-limiting steps for the elimination of ethanol are in common with these substances, so it competes with other alcohols for the alcohol dehydrogenase enzyme. Methanol itself is not highly toxic, but its metabolites formaldehyde and formic acid are; therefore, to reduce the rate of production and concentration of these harmful metabolites, ethanol can be ingested or injected. This avoids the production of toxic aldehyde and carboxylic acid derivatives, and reduces the more serious toxic effects of the glycols when crystallized in the kidneys. Ethylene glycol poisoning can be treated in the same way.

=== Warfare ===
Alcohol has a long association of military use, and has been called "liquid courage" for its role in preparing troops for battle, anesthetizing injured soldiers, and celebrating military victories. It has also served as a coping mechanism for combat stress reactions and a means of decompression from combat to everyday life.

=== Self-medication ===
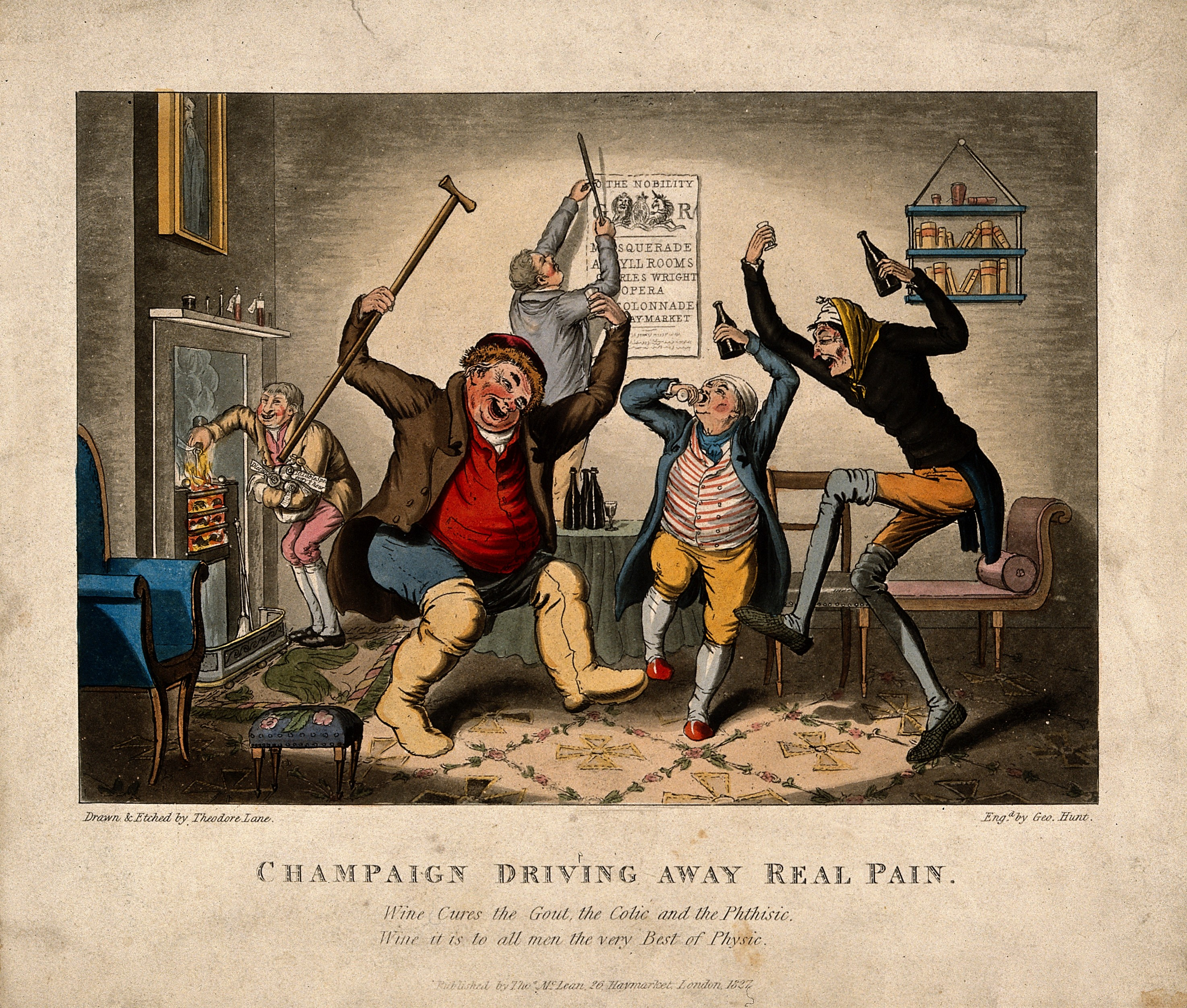
A group of merry, dancing invalids discarding their medicines in favour of alcohol as a cure. Coloured aquatint by G. Hunt, 1827, after T. Lane.

Alcohol can have analgesic (pain-relieving) effects, which is why some people with chronic pain turn to alcohol to self-medicate and try to alleviate their physical discomfort.

People with social anxiety disorder commonly self-medicate with alcohol to overcome their highly set inhibitions. However, self-medicating excessively for prolonged periods of time with alcohol often makes the symptoms of anxiety or depression worse. This is believed to occur as a result of the changes in brain chemistry from long-term use. A 2023 systematic review highlights the non-addictive use of alcohol for managing developmental issues, personality traits, and psychiatric symptoms, emphasizing the need for informed, harm-controlled approaches to alcohol consumption within a personalized health policy framework.

== Adverse effects ==
Deaths rates from alcohol use disorders, by country

Alcohol has a variety of short-term and long-term adverse effects. Alcohol has both short-term, and long-term effects on the memory, and sleep. It also has reinforcement-related adverse effects, including alcoholism, dependence, and withdrawal. Alcohol use is directly related to considerable morbidity and mortality, for instance due to intoxication and alcohol-related health problems. The World Health Organization advises that there is no safe level of alcohol consumption. Many of the toxic and unpleasant actions of alcohol in the body are mediated by its carcinogenic byproduct acetaldehyde.

=== Short-term effects ===
Symptoms of varying BAC levels. Additional symptoms may occur.

The amount of ethanol in the body is typically quantified by blood alcohol content (BAC); weight of ethanol per unit volume of blood. Small doses of ethanol, in general, are stimulant-like and produce euphoria and relaxation; people experiencing these symptoms tend to become talkative and less inhibited, and may exhibit poor judgement. At higher dosages (BAC > 1 gram/liter), ethanol acts as a central nervous system (CNS) depressant, producing at progressively higher dosages, impaired sensory and motor function, slowed cognition, stupefaction, unconsciousness, and possible death.

=== Hangover ===
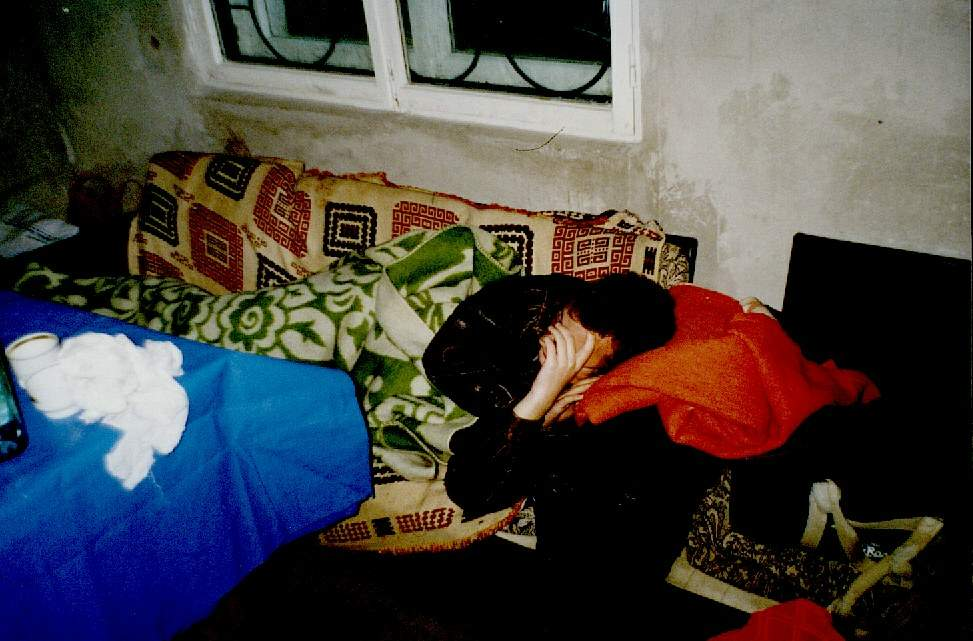
One of the signs of a severe hangover is a headache

A hangover is the experience of various unpleasant physiological and psychological effects usually following the consumption of alcohol, such as wine, beer, and liquor. Hangovers can last for several hours or for more than 24 hours. Typical symptoms of a hangover may include headache, drowsiness, concentration problems, dry mouth, dizziness, fatigue, gastrointestinal distress (e.g., nausea, vomiting, diarrhea), absence of hunger, light sensitivity, depression, sweating, hyper-excitability, irritability, and anxiety (often referred to as "hangxiety").

=== Long-term effects ===
The long-term effects of alcohol have been extensively researched. The health effects of long-term alcohol consumption vary depending on the amount consumed. Even light drinking poses health risks, but atypically small amounts of alcohol may have health benefits. Alcoholism causes severe health consequences which outweigh any potential benefits.

Long-term alcohol consumption is capable of damaging nearly every organ and system in the body. Risks include malnutrition, cirrhosis, chronic pancreatitis, erectile dysfunction, hypertension, coronary heart disease, ischemic stroke, heart failure, atrial fibrillation, gastritis, stomach ulcers, alcoholic liver disease, certain types of dementia, and several types of cancer, including oropharyngeal cancer, esophageal cancer, liver cancer, colorectal cancer, and female breast cancers. In addition, damage to the central nervous system and peripheral nervous system (e.g., painful peripheral neuropathy) can occur from chronic heavy alcohol consumption. There is also an increased risk for accidental injuries, for example, those sustained in traffic accidents and falls. Excessive alcohol consumption can have a negative impact on aging.

Conversely, light intake of alcohol may have some beneficial effects. The association of alcohol intake with reduced cardiovascular risk has been noted since 1904 and remains even after adjusting for known confounders. Light alcohol intake is also associated with reduced risk of type 2 diabetes, gastritis, and cholelithiasis. However, these are only observational studies and high-quality evidence for the beneficial effects of alcohol is nonexistent.

=== Social harms ===
The 2010 DrugScience study ranking various illegal and legal drugs based on statements by drug-harm experts. Alcohol was rated to be the 4th most harmful drug to users, the drug most harmful to others, and the most harmful drug overall.

Alcohol causes a plethora of detrimental effects in society. Addiction experts in psychiatry, chemistry, pharmacology, forensic science, epidemiology, and the police and legal services engaged in delphic analysis regarding 20 popular recreational substances. Alcohol was ranked 6th in dependence, 11th in physical harm, and 2nd in social harm. Alcohol use is stereotypically associated with crime, more so than other drugs like marijuana. Many emergency room visits involve alcohol use. As many as 15% of employees show problematic alcohol-related behaviors in the workplace, such as drinking before going to work or even drinking on the job. Drunk dialing refers to an intoxicated person making phone calls that they would not likely make if sober. Alcohol availability and consumption rates and alcohol rates are positively associated with nuisance, loitering, panhandling, and disorderly conduct in open spaces.

=== Binge drinking ===
Binge drinking, or heavy episodic drinking, is drinking alcoholic beverages with an intention of becoming intoxicated by heavy consumption of alcohol over a short period of time. Specific definitions vary considerably. Binge drinking is associated with risks such as suicide, sexual assault, cardiovascular issues, and brain damage, more acutely than alcohol use in general.

=== Alcohol use disorder ===
Rate of premature deaths due to alcohol

Alcoholism or its medical diagnosis alcohol use disorder refers to alcohol addiction, alcohol dependence, dipsomania, and/or alcohol abuse. It is a major problem and many health problems as well as death can result from excessive alcohol use. Alcohol dependence is linked to a lifespan that is reduced by about 12 years relative to the average person. In 2004, it was estimated that 4% of deaths worldwide were attributable to alcohol use. Deaths from alcohol are split about evenly between acute causes (e.g., overdose, accidents) and chronic conditions. The leading chronic alcohol-related condition associated with death is alcoholic liver disease. Alcohol dependence is also associated with cognitive impairment and organic brain damage. Some researchers have found that even one alcoholic drink a day increases an individual's risk of health problems by 0.4%.

Two or more consecutive alcohol-free days a week have been recommended to improve health and break dependence.

=== Withdrawal ===
Discontinuation of alcohol after extended heavy use and associated tolerance development (resulting in dependence) can result in alcohol withdrawal. Alcohol is one of the most dangerous drugs to withdraw from. Alcohol withdrawal can cause confusion, paranoia, anxiety, insomnia, agitation, tremors, fever, nausea, vomiting, autonomic dysfunction, seizures, and hallucinations. In severe cases, death can result.

Delirium tremens is a condition that develops in some cases of severe withdrawal, with onset typically 48–72 hours after discontinuation. It is considered a medical emergency and should be treated in an inpatient or intensive care unit.

=== Pregnancy ===
Baby with fetal alcohol syndrome, showing some of the characteristic facial features

Ethanol is classified as a teratogen—a substance known to cause birth defects; according to the U.S. Centers for Disease Control and Prevention (CDC), alcohol consumption by women who are not using birth control increases the risk of fetal alcohol spectrum disorders (FASDs). This group of conditions encompasses fetal alcohol syndrome, partial fetal alcohol syndrome, alcohol-related neurodevelopmental disorder, static encephalopathy, and alcohol-related birth defects. The CDC currently recommends complete abstinence from alcoholic beverages for women of child-bearing age who are pregnant or trying to become pregnant.

=== Peptic ulcer disease ===
In patients who have a peptic ulcer disease (PUD), the mucosal layer is broken down by ethanol. PUD is commonly associated with the bacteria Helicobacter pylori, which secretes a toxin that weakens the mucosal wall, allowing acid and protein enzymes to penetrate the weakened barrier. Because alcohol stimulates the stomach to secrete acid, a person with PUD should avoid drinking alcohol on an empty stomach. Drinking alcohol causes more acid release, which further damages the already-weakened stomach wall. Complications of this disease could include a burning pain in the abdomen, bloating, and, in severe cases, the presence of dark black stools indicating internal bleeding. A person who drinks alcohol regularly is strongly advised to reduce their intake to prevent PUD aggravation.

=== Allergic-like reactions ===
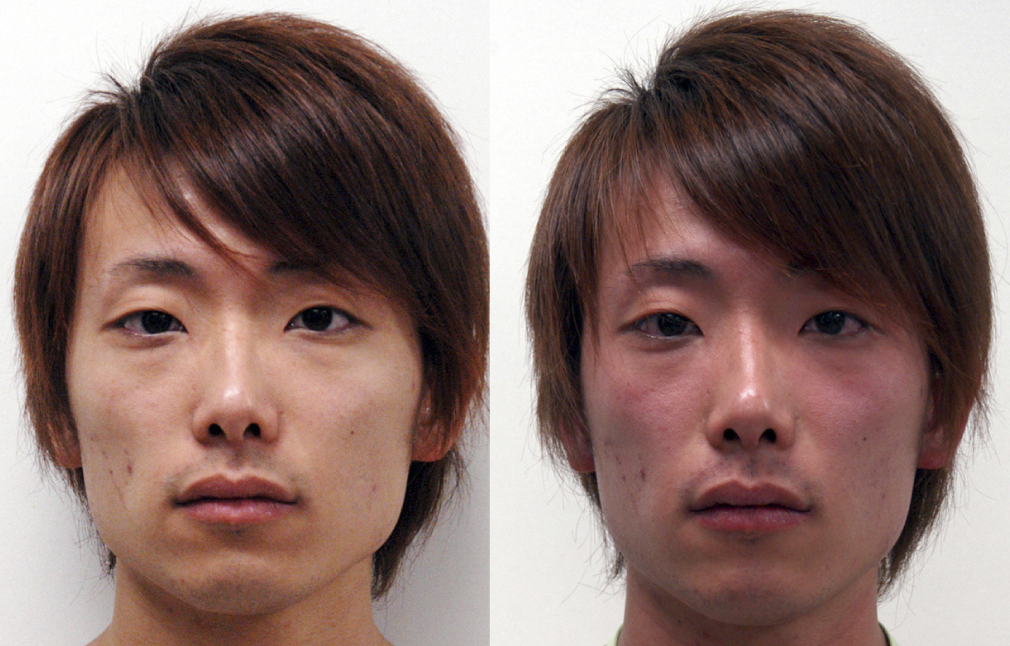
Facial flushing. Before (left) and after (right) drinking alcohol. A 22-year-old East Asian man who is ALDH2 heterozygous showing the reaction.

Ethanol-containing beverages can cause alcohol flush reactions, exacerbations of rhinitis, and, more seriously and commonly, bronchoconstriction in patients with a history of asthma, and in some cases, urticarial skin eruptions, and systemic dermatitis. Such reactions can occur within 1–60 minutes of ethanol ingestion, and may be caused by:

- genetic abnormalities in the metabolism of ethanol, which can cause the ethanol metabolite, acetaldehyde, to accumulate in tissues and trigger the release of histamine, or
- true allergy reactions to allergens occurring naturally in, or contaminating, alcoholic beverages (particularly wine and beer), and
- other unknown causes.

=== Diabetes ===
Alcohol consumption can cause hypoglycemia in diabetics on certain medications, such as insulin or sulfonylurea, by blocking gluconeogenesis. Alcohol increases insulin response to glucose promoting fat storage and hindering carbohydrate and fat oxidation. This excess processing in the liver of acetyl CoA can lead to fatty liver disease and eventually alcoholic liver disease. This progression can lead to further complications, alcohol-related liver disease may cause exocrine pancreatic insufficiency, the inability to properly digest food due to a lack or reduction of digestive enzymes made by the pancreas.

== Overdose ==
Alcohol is the leading cause of direct deaths from drug overdoses.

Symptoms of ethanol overdose may include nausea, vomiting, CNS depression, coma, acute respiratory failure, or death. Levels of even less than 0.1% can cause intoxication, with unconsciousness often occurring at 0.3–0.4%. Death from ethanol consumption is possible when blood alcohol levels reach 0.4%. A blood level of 0.5% or more is commonly fatal. The oral median lethal dose (LD_{50}) of ethanol in rats is 5,628 mg/kg. Directly translated to human beings, this would mean that if a person who weighs 70 kg (150 lb) drank a 500 mL (17 US fl oz) glass of pure ethanol, they would have an estimated 50% risk of dying. The highest blood alcohol level ever recorded, in which the subject survived, is 1.41%.

== Interactions ==
=== Alcohol-induced dose dumping (AIDD) ===
Alcohol-induced dose dumping (AIDD) is an unintended rapid release of large amounts of a given drug, when administered through a modified-release dosage while co-ingesting ethanol. This is considered a pharmaceutical disadvantage due to the high risk of causing drug-induced toxicity by increasing the absorption and serum concentration above the therapeutic window of the drug. The best way to prevent this interaction is by avoiding the co-ingestion of both substances or using specific controlled-release formulations that are resistant to AIDD. Particular drugs of concern are antipsychotics and certain antidepressants.

=== Hypnotics and sedatives ===
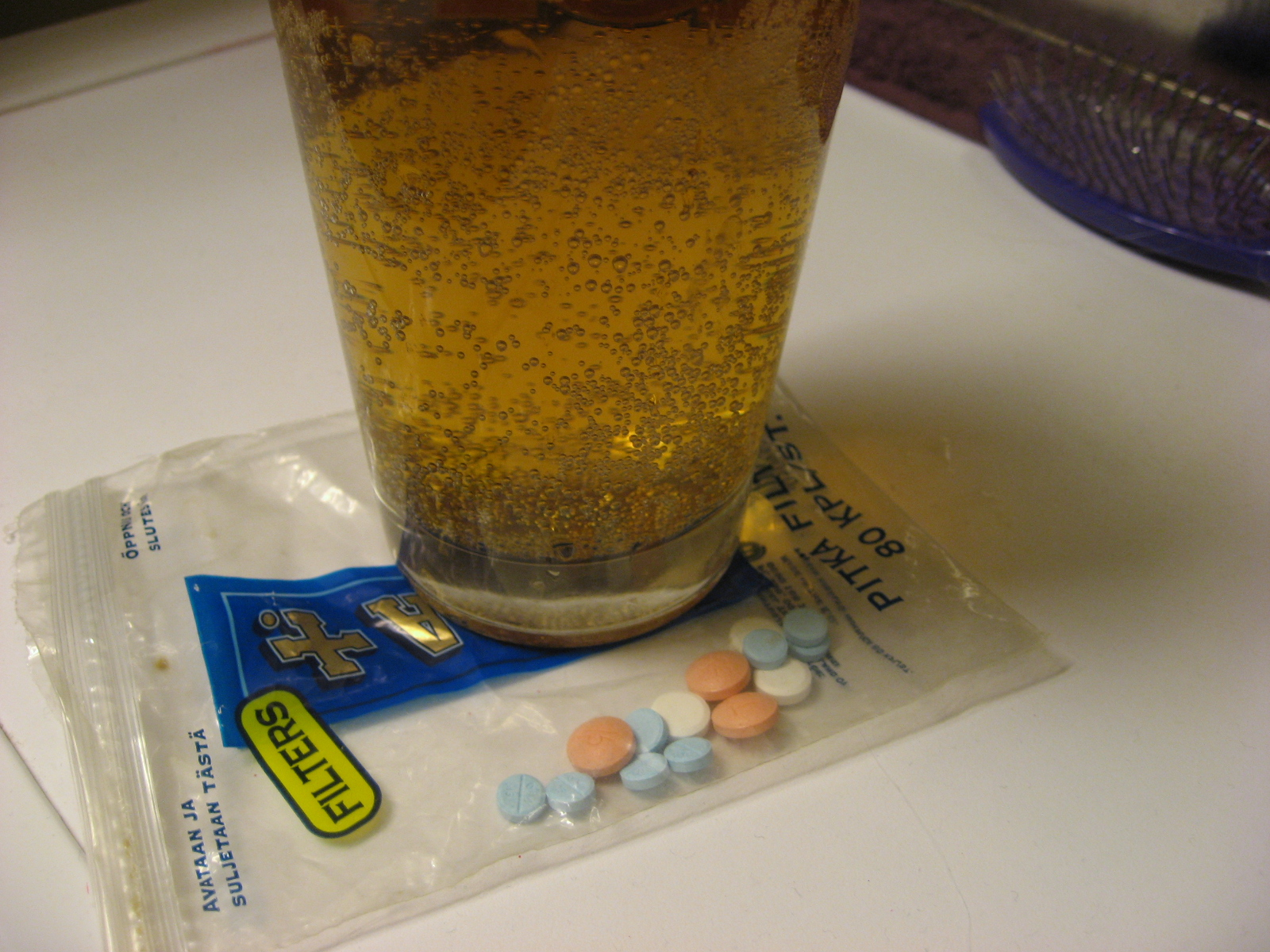
Tranquillizers, sleeping pills, opiates, and alcohol. Opioid-related deaths often involve alcohol.

Alcohol can intensify the sedation caused by hypnotics and sedatives such as barbiturates, benzodiazepines, sedative antihistamines, opioids, nonbenzodiazepines/Z-drugs (such as zolpidem and zopiclone).

=== Disulfiram ===
Disulfiram inhibits the enzyme acetaldehyde dehydrogenase, which in turn results in buildup of acetaldehyde, a toxic metabolite of ethanol with unpleasant effects. The medication or drug is commonly used to treat alcohol use disorder, and results in immediate hangover-like symptoms upon consumption of alcohol, this effect is widely known as disulfiram effect.

=== Metronidazole ===
Metronidazole is an antibacterial agent that kills bacteria by damaging cellular DNA and hence cellular function. Metronidazole is usually given to people who have diarrhea caused by Clostridioides difficile bacteria. Patients who are taking metronidazole are sometimes advised to avoid alcohol, even after 1 hour following the last dose. Although older data suggested a possible disulfiram-like effect of metronidazole, newer data has challenged this and suggests it does not actually have this effect.

=== NSAIDs ===
Nonsteroidal anti-inflammatory drugs (NSAIDs) and alcohol both increase gastrointestinal events such as gastrointestinal bleeding and peptic ulcers. Taking the two together further increases the risk additively.

The risk of stomach bleeding is still increased when aspirin is taken with alcohol or warfarin.

=== Methylphenidate ===
Ethanol enhances the bioavailability of methylphenidate (elevated plasma dexmethylphenidate). Ethylphenidate formation appears to be more common when large quantities of methylphenidate and alcohol are consumed at the same time, such as in non-medical use or overdose scenarios. However, only a small percent of the consumed methylphenidate is converted to ethylphenidate.

=== Nicotine ===
While nicotinis mimic the name of classic cocktails like the appletini (their name deriving from "martini"), combining nicotine with alcohol may cause adverse effects. Tobacco and nicotine actually heighten cravings for alcohol, making this a risky mix.

=== Caffeine ===
Controlled animal and human studies showed that caffeine (energy drinks) in combination with alcohol increased the craving for more alcohol more strongly than alcohol alone. These findings correspond to epidemiological data that people who consume energy drinks generally showed an increased tendency to take alcohol and other substances.

=== Cocaine ===
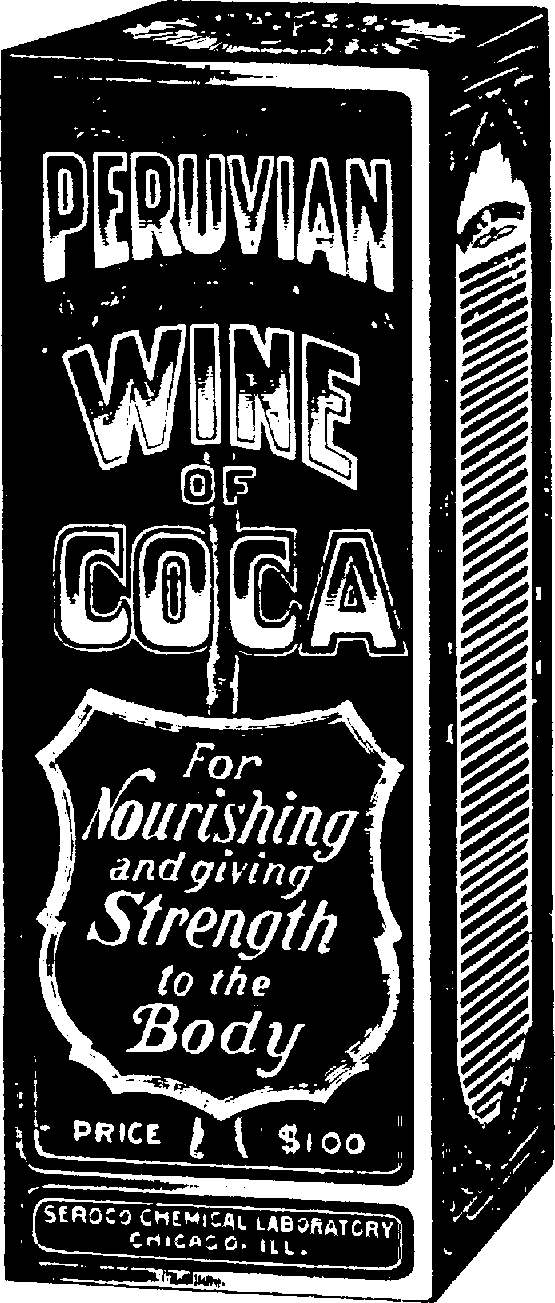
Coca wine

Ethanol interacts with cocaine in vivo to produce cocaethylene, another psychoactive substance which may be substantially more cardiotoxic than either cocaine or alcohol by themselves.

=== Cannabis ===
In combination with cannabis, ethanol increases plasma tetrahydrocannabinol levels, which suggests that ethanol may increase the absorption of tetrahydrocannabinol.

=== Warfarin ===
Excessive use of alcohol is known to affect the metabolism of warfarin and can elevate the INR, and thus increase the risk of bleeding. The U.S. Food and Drug Administration (FDA) product insert on warfarin states that alcohol should be avoided. The Cleveland Clinic suggests that when taking warfarin one should not drink more than "one beer, 6 oz of wine, or one shot of alcohol per day".

=== Isoniazid ===
Use of isoniazid should be carefully monitored in daily alcohol drinkers since they may be more likely to develop isoniazid-associated hepatitis.

== Pharmacology ==
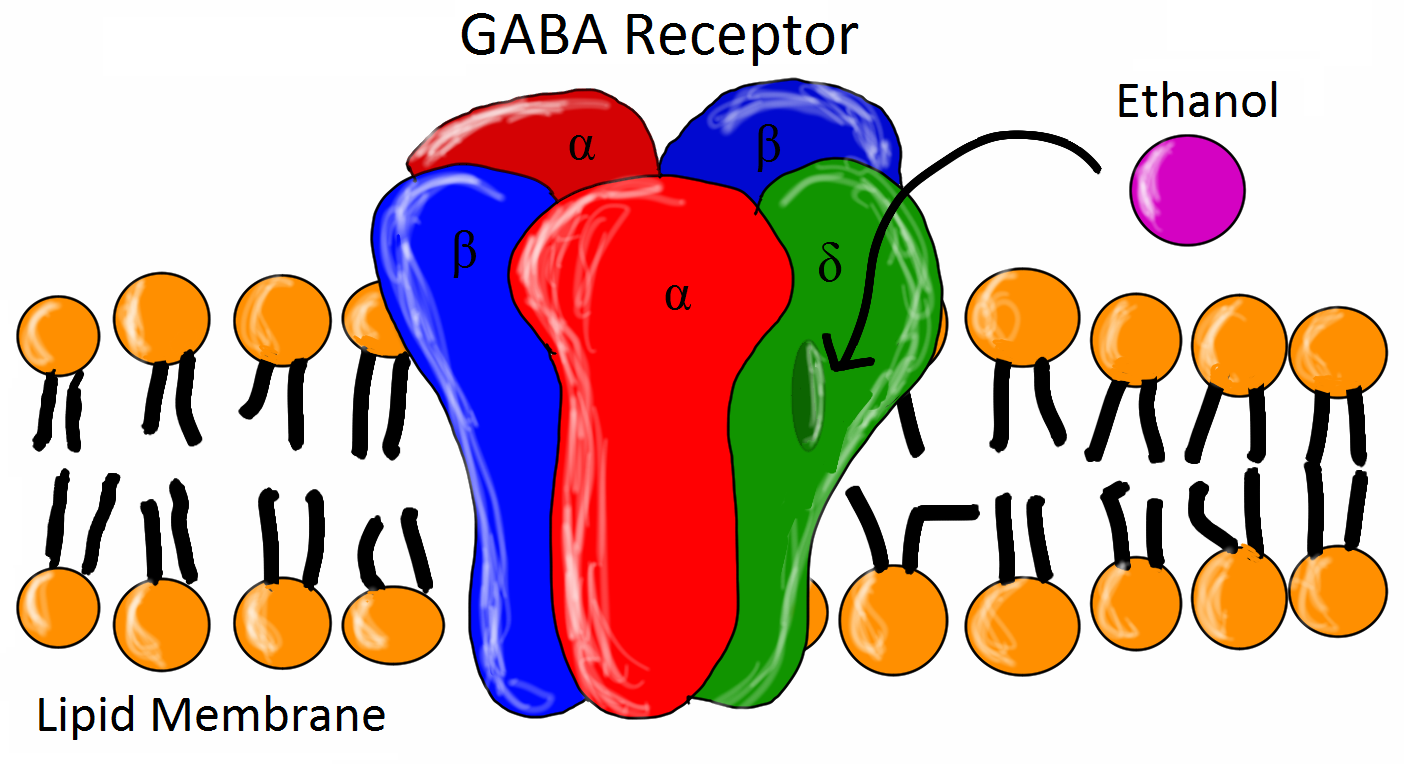
Ethanol binding to GABA_{A} receptor

Alcohol works in the brain primarily by increasing the effects of GABA (γ-aminobutyric acid), the major inhibitory neurotransmitter in the brain; by facilitating GABA's actions in the GABA_{A} receptor, alcohol suppresses the activity of the central nervous system. Alcohol also directly affects a number of other neurotransmitter systems including those of glutamate, glycine, acetylcholine, and serotonin. The pleasurable effects of alcohol ingestion are the result of increased levels of dopamine and endogenous opioids in the reward pathways of the brain.

After oral ingestion, ethanol is absorbed via the stomach and intestines into the bloodstream. Ethanol is highly water-soluble and diffuses passively throughout the entire body, including the brain. Soon after ingestion, it begins to be metabolized, 90% or more by the liver. One standard drink is sufficient to almost completely saturate the liver's capacity to metabolize alcohol. The main metabolite is acetaldehyde, a toxic carcinogen. Acetaldehyde is then further metabolized into ionic acetate by the enzyme aldehyde dehydrogenase (ALDH). Acetate is not carcinogenic and has low toxicity, but has been implicated in causing hangovers. Acetate is further broken down into carbon dioxide and water and eventually eliminated from the body through urine and breath. 5 to 10% of ethanol is excreted unchanged in the breath, urine, and sweat.

== Chemistry ==
Ethanol is also known chemically as alcohol, ethyl alcohol, or drinking alcohol. It is a simple alcohol with a molecular formula of C_{2}H_{6}O and a molecular weight of 46.0684 g/mol. The molecular formula of ethanol may also be written as CH_{3}−CH_{2}−OH or as C_{2}H_{5}−OH. The latter can also be thought of as an ethyl group linked to a hydroxyl (alcohol) group and can be abbreviated as EtOH. Ethanol is a volatile, flammable, colorless liquid with a slight characteristic odor. Aside from its use as a psychoactive and recreational substance, ethanol is also commonly used as an antiseptic and disinfectant, a chemical and medicinal solvent, and a fuel.

=== Analogues ===
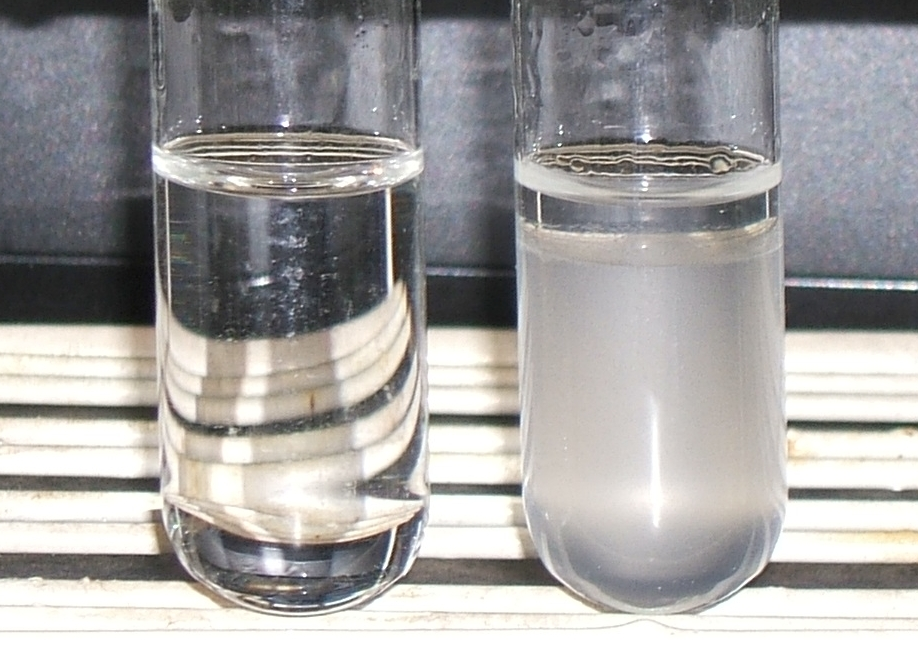
Lucas test: negative (left) with ethanol and positive with t-butanol.

Ethanol is only one of several types of chemical alcohols, and has a variety of analogues. Most other alcohols are considered poisonous. In general, higher alcohols are less toxic. Alcoholic beverages are sometimes laced with toxic alcohols.

The toxicity of isopropyl alcohol is about twice that of ethanol; a mild, brief exposure to isopropyl alcohol is unlikely to cause any serious harm, although ingesting significant quantities can lead to vomiting, abdominal pain, and internal bleeding. Methanol is the most toxic alcohol. Ingestion of as little as 3.16 grams of methanol can cause irreversible optic nerve damage, and the oral LD50 for humans is estimated to be 56.2 grams. Many methanol poisoning incidents have occurred through history. n-Butanol is reported to produce similar effects to those of ethanol and relatively low toxicity (one-sixth of that of ethanol in one rat study). However, its vapors can produce eye irritation, and inhalation can cause pulmonary edema. Acetone (propanone) is a ketone rather than an alcohol, and is reported to produce similar toxic effects; it can be extremely damaging to the cornea.

Although ethanol is the most prevalent alcohol in alcoholic beverages, alcoholic beverages contain several types of psychoactive alcohols, that are categorized as primary, secondary, or tertiary. Primary and secondary alcohols, are oxidized to aldehydes, and ketones, respectively, while tertiary alcohols are generally resistant to oxidation. The Lucas test differentiates between primary, secondary, and tertiary alcohols. The tertiary alcohol tert-amyl alcohol (TAA), also known as 2-methylbutan-2-ol (2M2B), has a history of use as a hypnotic and anesthetic, as do other tertiary alcohols such as methylpentynol, ethchlorvynol, and chloralodol. Unlike primary alcohols like ethanol, these tertiary alcohols cannot be oxidized into aldehyde or carboxylic acid metabolites, which are often toxic, and for this reason, these compounds are safer in comparison. Other relatives of ethanol with similar effects include chloral hydrate, paraldehyde, and many volatile and inhalational anesthetics (e.g., chloroform, diethyl ether, and isoflurane).

== Manufacturing ==
Ethanol is produced naturally as a byproduct of the metabolic processes of yeast and hence is present in any yeast habitat, including even endogenously in humans, but it does not cause raised blood alcohol content as seen in the rare medical condition auto-brewery syndrome (ABS). It is manufactured through hydration of ethylene or by brewing via fermentation of sugars with yeast (most commonly Saccharomyces cerevisiae). The sugars are commonly obtained from sources like steeped cereal grains (e.g., barley), grape juice, and sugarcane products (e.g., molasses, sugarcane juice). Ethanol–water mixture which can be further purified via distillation.

== History ==
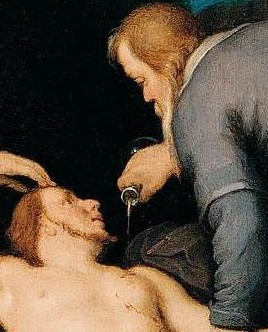
Detail from The Good Samaritan by Cornelis van Haarlem (1627) showing the Samaritan pouring oil and wine on the injured man's wounds

Alcohol is one of the oldest recreational drugs. The word "Alcohol" originates from the Arabic word al-kuhul, which refers to a fine metallic powder that was used to paint the eyelids darker. Alcoholic beverages have been produced since the Neolithic period, as early as 7000 BC in China. Alcohol was brewed as early as 7,000 to 6,650 BCE in northern China. The earliest evidence of winemaking was dated at 6,000 to 5,800 BCE in Georgia in the South Caucasus. Beer was likely brewed from barley as early as 13,000 years ago in the Middle East. Pliny the Elder wrote about the golden age of winemaking in Rome, the 2nd century BCE (200–100 BCE), when vineyards were planted.

=== Early modern period ===
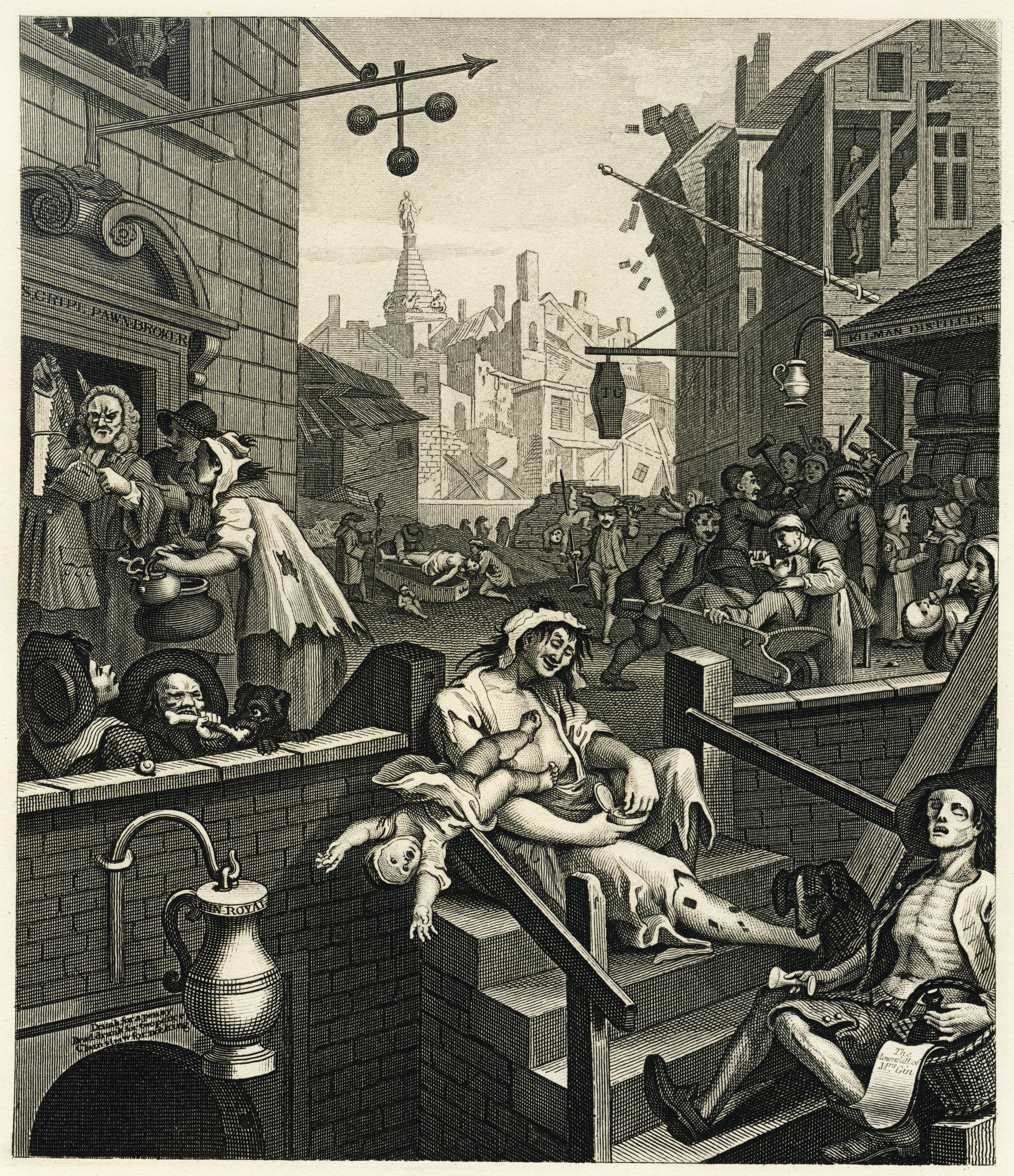
Gin Lane by William Hogarth, 1751

The Gin Craze was a period in the first half of the 18th century when the consumption of gin increased rapidly in Great Britain, especially in London. By 1743, The average English person was drinking 2.2 gallons (10 litres) of gin per year. The Sale of Spirits Act 1750 (commonly known as the Gin Act 1751) was an Act of the Parliament of Great Britain (24 Geo. 2. c. 40) which was enacted to reduce the consumption of gin and other distilled spirits, a popular pastime that was regarded as one of the primary causes of crime in London.

=== Modern period ===
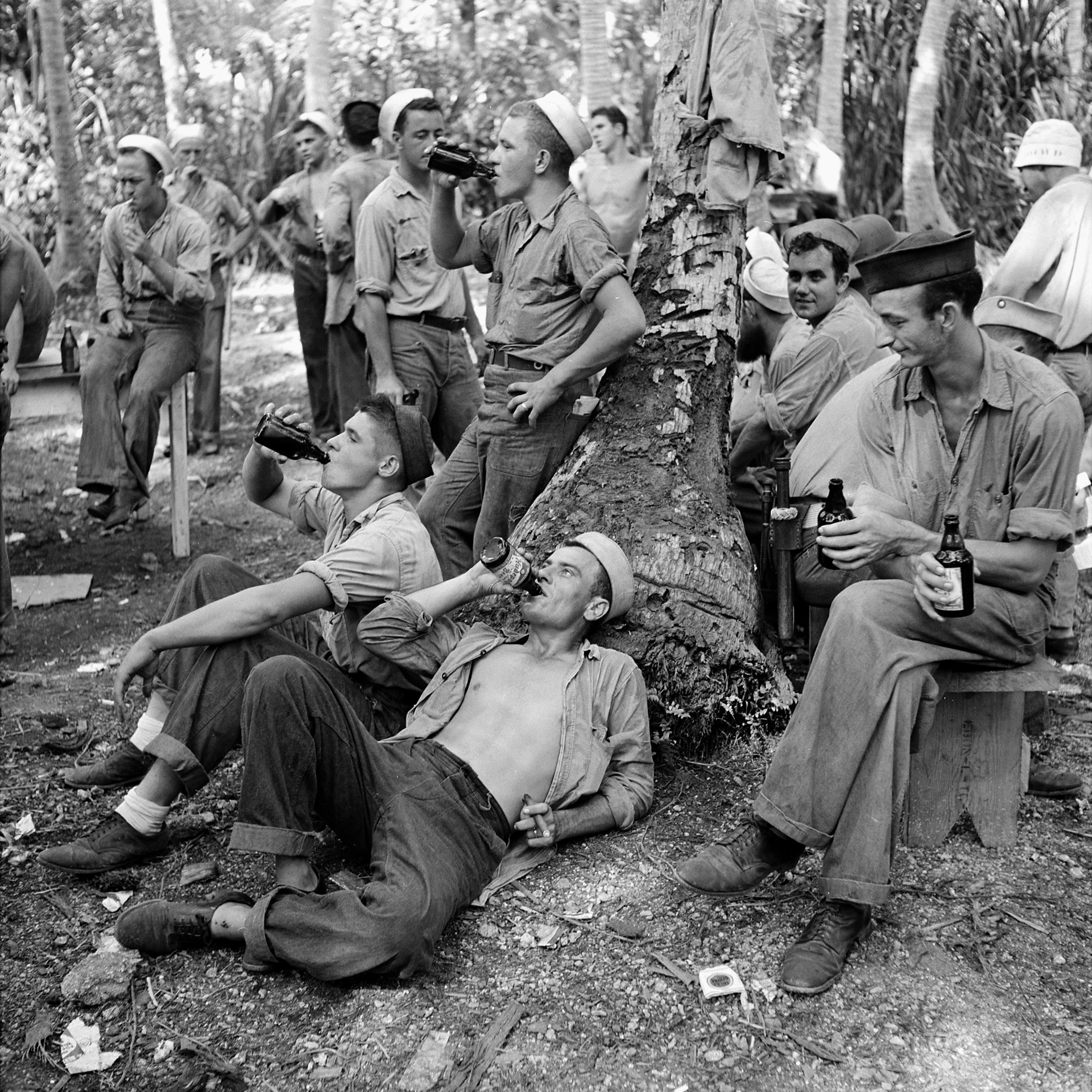
Navy personnel on liberty at Mogmog Island. Enlisted men lounge about a tiny island with plenty of beer.

The rum ration (also called the tot) was a daily amount of rum given to sailors on Royal Navy ships. It started 1866 and was abolished in 1970 after concerns that the intake of strong alcohol would lead to unsteady hands when working machinery.

The Andrew Johnson alcoholism debate is the dispute, originally conducted among the general public, and now typically a question for historians, about whether or not Andrew Johnson, the 17th president of the United States (1865–1869), drank to excess.

The prohibition in the United States era was the period from 1920 to 1933 when the United States prohibited the production, importation, transportation, and sale of alcoholic beverages. The nationwide ban on alcoholic beverages, was repealed by the passage of the Twenty-first Amendment to the United States Constitution on 5 December 1933.

The Bratt System was a system that was used in Sweden (1919–1955) and similarly in Finland (1944–1970) to control alcohol consumption, by rationing of liquor. Every citizen allowed to consume alcohol was given a booklet called a motbok (viinakortti in Finland), in which a stamp was added each time a purchase was made at Systembolaget (in Sweden) and Alko (in Finland). A similar system also existed in Estonia between 1 July 1920, to 31 December 1925. The stamps were based on the amount of alcohol bought. When a certain amount of alcohol had been bought, the owner of the booklet had to wait until next month to buy more.

The Medicinal Liquor Prescriptions Act of 1933 was a law passed by Congress in response to the abuse of medicinal liquor prescriptions during Prohibition.

Gilbert Paul Jordan (aka The Boozing Barber) was a Canadian serial killer who is believed to have committed the so-called "alcohol murders" between 1965–c. 2004 in Vancouver, British Columbia.

== Society and culture ==
The consumption of alcohol is deeply embedded in social practices and rituals, often celebrated as a cornerstone of community gatherings and personal milestones. Drinking culture is the set of traditions and social behaviours that surround the consumption of alcoholic beverages as a recreational drug and social lubricant.

=== Legal status ===
Alcohol consumption is fully legal and available in most countries of the world. Home made alcoholic beverages with low alcohol content like wine, and beer is also legal in most countries, but distilling moonshine outside of a registered distillery remains illegal in most of them.

Some majority-Muslim countries, such as Saudi Arabia, Kuwait, Pakistan, Iran, and Libya prohibit the production, sale, and consumption of alcoholic beverages because they are forbidden by Islam. Also, laws banning alcohol consumption are found in some Indian states as well as some Native American reservations in the U.S.

In addition, there are regulations on alcohol sales and use in many countries throughout the world. For instance, the majority of countries have a minimum legal drinking age to purchase or consume alcoholic beverages, although there are often exceptions such as underage consumption of small amounts of alcohol with parental supervision. Also, some countries have bans on public intoxication. Drinking while driving or intoxicated driving is frequently outlawed, and it may be illegal to have an open container of alcohol or liquor bottle in an automobile, bus, or aircraft. The legality of sex under alcohol influence varies by country and the threshold of "too drunk" for sexual consent can be ambiguous.

=== Religion ===
Religion and alcohol have a complex history. The world's religions have had different relationships with alcohol, reflecting diverse cultural, social, and religious practices across different traditions. While some religions strictly prohibit alcohol consumption, viewing it as sinful or harmful to spiritual and physical well-being, others incorporate it into their rituals and ceremonies. Throughout history, alcohol has held significant roles in religious observances, from the use of sacramental wine in Christian sacraments to the offering and moderate drinking of omiki (sacramental sake) in Shinto purification rituals.

=== Impact ===
A study in 2015 found that alcohol and tobacco use combined resulted in a significant health burden, costing over a quarter of a billion disability-adjusted life years. Illicit drug use caused tens of millions more disability-adjusted life years.

According to The Lancet, 'four industries (tobacco, unhealthy food, fossil fuel, and alcohol) are responsible for at least a third of global deaths per year'. In 2024, the World Health Organization published a report including these figures.

Many Native Americans in the United States have been harmed by, or become addicted to, drinking alcohol.

Qualitative analysis reveals that the alcohol industry likely misinforms the public about the dangers of alcohol, similar to the tobacco industry. The alcohol industry influences alcohol policy and health messages, including those for schoolchildren.

=== Standard drink ===
The alcohol consumption recommendations (or safe limits) varies from no intake, to daily, weekly, or daily/weekly guidelines provided by health agencies of governments. The WHO published a statement in The Lancet Public Health in April 2023 that "there is no safe amount that does not affect health."

A standard drink is a measure of alcohol consumption representing a fixed amount of pure ethanol, used in relation to recommendations about alcohol consumption and its relative risks to health. The size of a standard drink varies from 8g to 20g across countries, but 10g alcohol (12.7 millilitres) is used in the World Health Organization (WHO) Alcohol Use Disorders Identification Test (AUDIT)'s questionnaire form example, and has been adopted by more countries than any other amount.

== See also ==
- Alcohol myopia
- Binge drinking
- Drug-related crime
- GABAergic
- GABRD (δ subunit-containing receptors)
- Holiday heart syndrome
- List of countries by alcohol consumption per capita
- Pigouvian taxes, to pay for the damage to society caused by these goods
- Rum-running
- Sin taxes increase the price in an effort to lower their use, or, failing that, to increase and find new sources of revenue.

== Notes ==
Pathophysiology of ethanol
Pharmacology of ethanol
