= Drunkorexia =

Term for a food and drink disorder

Drunkorexia is a term for anorexia or bulimia combined with an alcohol use disorder. While at first a colloquialism, the term later found its way into clinical literature. The term is generally used to denote the utilization of extreme weight control methods to compensate for planned binge drinking. Research on the combination of an eating disorder and binge drinking has primarily focused on college-aged women, though the phenomenon has also been noted among young men. Studies suggest that individuals engage in this combination of self-imposed malnutrition and binge drinking to avoid weight gain from alcohol, to save money for purchasing alcohol, and to facilitate alcohol intoxication.

== Link between binge drinking and eating disorders ==
Studies reveal that individuals experiencing an eating disorder are at a higher risk of developing substance use disorders. It is reported that up to half of individuals with eating disorders misuse alcohol or illicit substances, with anorexia and bulimia being the disorders most commonly linked to substance use. The National Association of Anorexia Nervosa and Associated Disorders reports that 72% of women who admit to inappropriate alcohol use also classify as suffering from an eating disorder.

== Symptoms ==
Drunkorexia consists of three major aspects: alcohol use/misuse, food intake restriction, and excessive physical activity. It is commonly summarized in the following activities:

- Counting daily calorie intake (commonly known as "calorie counting") to ensure no weight is gained when consuming alcohol.
- Missing or skipping meals to conserve calories to consume alcoholic beverages.
- Over-exercising to compensate calories consumed from alcoholic beverages.
- Consuming an extreme amount of alcohol to vomit previously ingested food.

== Treatment ==
Drunkorexia is not a medically diagnosed disorder; therefore, there is no specific treatment. However, as drunkorexia is a combination of two different disorders, binge drinking and eating disorders such as anorexia and bulimia, the treatment needs to address both.

== Effects ==
The combination of self-starvation and excessive consumption of alcohol can lead to an array of physical and psychological consequences. Drinking in a state of malnutrition can predispose individuals to a higher rate of blackouts, alcohol poisoning, alcohol-related injury, violence, or illness. Drinking on an empty stomach allows ethanol to reach the blood system faster and raises one's blood alcohol content at a dangerous speed, which can render the drinker more vulnerable to alcohol-related brain damage. In addition, excessive alcohol consumption can have a detrimental impact on hydration and mineral and nutrient retention, which exacerbates the consequences of malnutrition and compromises an individual's cognitive faculties. These effects are more pronounced in women as women usually metabolize alcohol slower than men.

== At-risk populations ==
In the United States, drunkorexia is found to be most common among university students, as they are faced with the conflicting pressure of heavy drinking and maintaining a slim physique. First-year college students are said to be especially predisposed to eating disorders as an attempt to avoid the fabled "Freshman 15", defined as the weight gain that results from adjusting to a college lifestyle.

The National Eating Disorder Association disclosed that approximately 20% of college students of both sexes admitted to suffering from an eating disorder at some point in their life. In addition, a 2002 study reported 70%, of participating college students, reported consumed alcohol within the prior month and 40% had engaged in binge drinking.

A 2013 survey observed 107 female university students in order to study the frequency and correlation of self-induced vomiting after consuming alcohol. Results showed that 59.8% of the participants who reported drinking alcohol also appeared to have engaged in self-induced vomiting after alcohol consumption. Participants that reported self-induced vomiting after alcohol consumption also reported more bulimia nervosa symptomatology.

In Australia, a 2013 study surveyed 139 Australian women between the ages of 18 and 29 enrolled in an undergraduate degree at university. These women were asked to complete a survey regarding compensatory eating and behaviors in response to alcohol consumption to test for drunkorexia symptomatology. In the sample tested, 79% of participants demonstrated engaging in characterized drunkorexia behavior. Further analysis of the results showed that the social norms of drinking and the social norms associated with body image and thinness impacted heavily upon the motivation for these behaviors.

Other research has shown that a further correlation exists between college students who participate in physical activity and alcohol dependence. Individuals who were more physically active than their peers had a higher tendency to be alcohol dependent or to engage in regular binge drinking. Excessive exercise is often perceived as a symptom of anorexia nervosa and other associated eating disorders, which further exemplifies the existence of drunkorexia, particularly in college-age individuals.

Another study found that there was little difference between drunkorexia rates among students, non students and former students.

== Motivations ==
The motivations behind drunkorexia as a pattern of behavior is one of the lesser understood aspects of the condition. It is suspected that the predominant factors in the development of drunkorexia are a distorted self-perception congruent with unrealistic standards of body image, peer pressure to assimilate to the norm in terms of social drinking and societal standards of beauty, a coping mechanism against anxiety and depression, and as a means of getting intoxicated rapidly in response to stress and or peer pressure.

Other motivations for drunkorexia include; preventing weight gain, saving money that would be spent on food to buy alcohol, and getting intoxicated faster.

== Drunkorexia as a diagnosis ==
Co-existing, and self-reinforcing starvation and alcohol disorders are gaining recognition in the fields of dual diagnosis, psychiatry, and addictionology.
