= Long-term impact of alcohol on the brain =

Effect of alcohol consumption on the brain

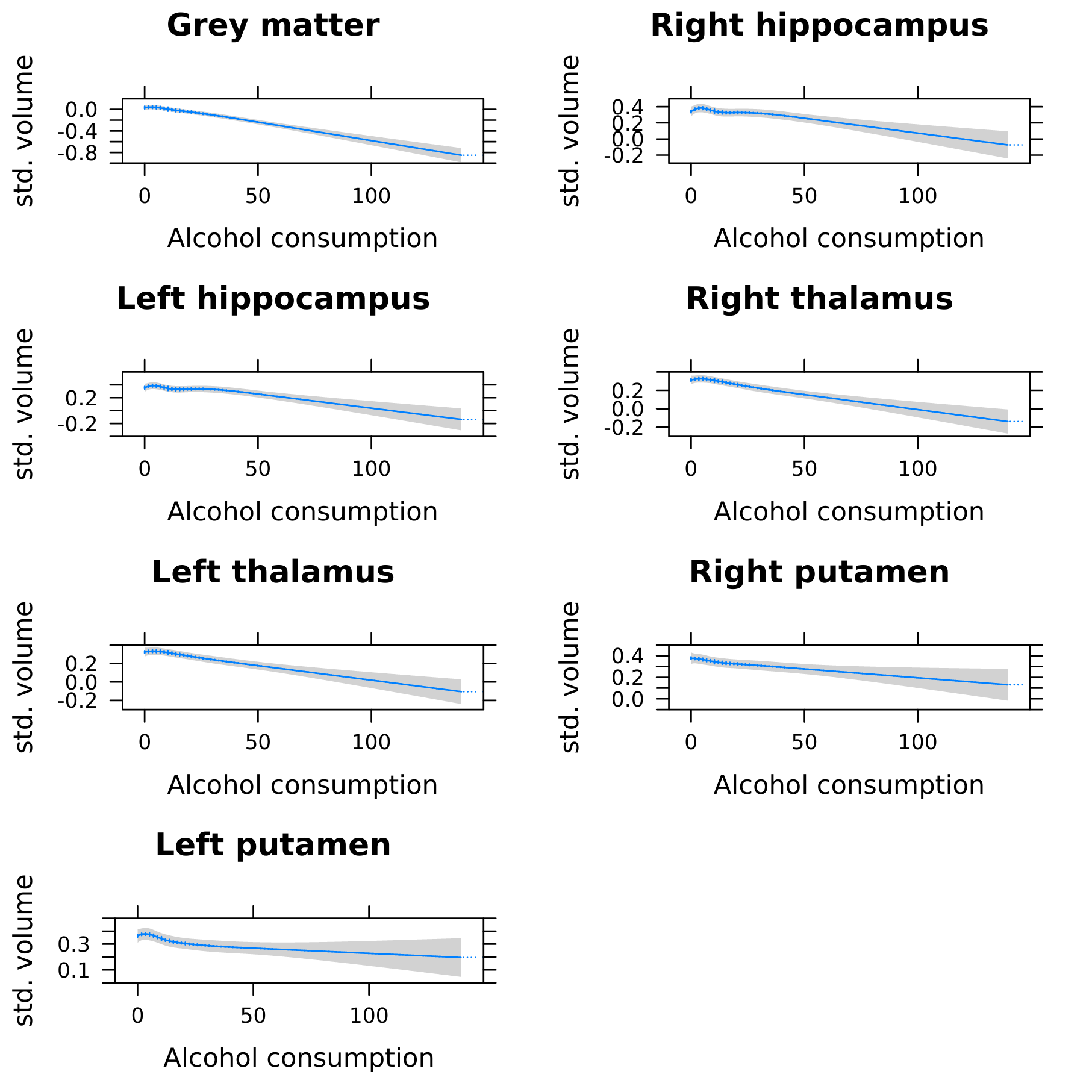
Results of alcohol consumption levels

The long-term impact of alcohol on the brain encompasses a wide range of effects, varying by drinking patterns, age, genetics, and other health factors. Among the many organs alcohol affects, the brain is particularly vulnerable. Heavy drinking causes alcohol-related brain damage, with alcohol acting as a direct neurotoxin to nerve cells, while low levels of alcohol consumption can cause decreases in brain volume, regional gray matter volume, and white matter microstructure. Low-to-moderate alcohol intake may be associated with certain cognitive benefits or neuroprotection in older adults. Social and psychological factors can offer minor protective effects. The overall relationship between alcohol use and brain health is complex, reflecting the balance between alcohol's neurotoxic effects and potential modulatory influences.

== Classification ==
The neurological consequences of long-term alcohol use can be broadly classified into harmful outcomes (e.g., brain atrophy, cognitive decline, dementia), potential neutral effects, and, in limited cases, minor protective effects associated with low-to-moderate consumption. Severe manifestations are often categorized under alcohol-related brain damage (ARBD), including conditions such as Wernicke-Korsakoff syndrome and alcohol-related dementia.

Alcoholics can typically be divided into two categories, uncomplicated and complicated. Uncomplicated alcoholics do not have nutritional deficiency states or liver disease, but have a reduction in overall brain volume due to white matter cerebral atrophy. The severity of atrophy sustained from alcohol consumption is proportional to the rate and amount of alcohol consumed during a person's life. Complicated alcoholics may have liver damage that impacts brain structure and function and nutritional deficiencies "that can cause severe brain damage and dysfunction".

== Characteristics ==
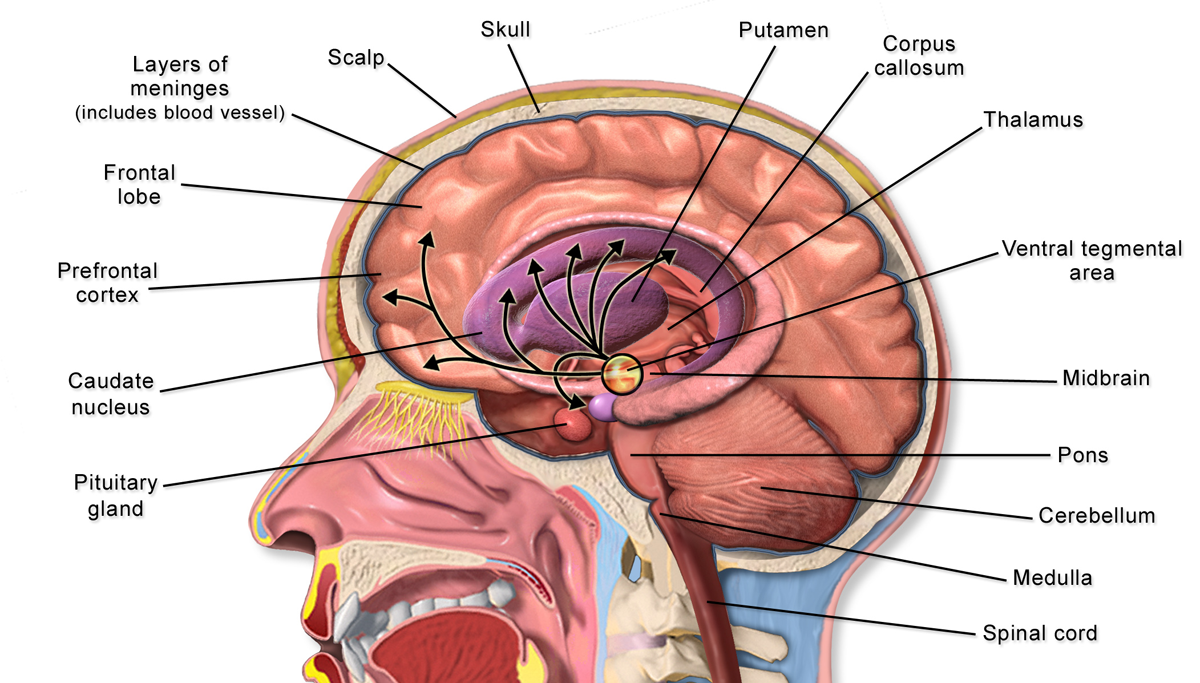
Brain anatomy

Excessive alcohol consumption is associated with widespread and significant brain lesions, specifically damage to brain regions including the frontal lobe, limbic system, and cerebellum, with widespread cerebral atrophy, or brain shrinkage caused by neuron degeneration. This damage can be seen on neuroimaging scans. Alcohol alters both the structure and function of the brain as a result of the direct neurotoxic effects of alcohol intoxication or acute alcohol withdrawal. Increased alcohol intake is associated with damage to brain regions including the frontal lobe, limbic system, and cerebellum, with widespread cerebral atrophy, or brain shrinkage caused by neuron degeneration. Frontal lobe damage becomes the most prominent as alcoholics age and can lead to impaired neuropsychological performance in areas such as problem solving, good judgment, and goal-directed behaviors. Impaired emotional processing results from damage to the limbic system. This may lead to troubles recognizing emotional facial expressions and "interpreting nonverbal emotional cues".

The effects can manifest much later—mid-life Alcohol Use Disorder has been found to correlate with increased risk of severe cognitive and memory deficits in later life.

Alcohol consumption can substantially impair neurobiologically-beneficial and -demanding exercise.

In some cases occasional moderate consumption may have ancillary benefits on the brain due to social and psychological benefits if compared to alcohol abstinence and soberness. Researchers have found that moderate alcohol consumption in older adults is associated with better cognition and well-being than abstinence.

=== Complications ===
Serious complications include irreversible brain damage, psychiatric disorders (e.g., depression, anxiety), and increased risk of other neurodegenerative conditions, such as Alzheimer's disease.

== Causes ==
Alcohol is known to have direct neurotoxic effects on brain matter, both during alcohol intoxication and alcohol withdrawal. While the extent of causation is difficult to prove, alcohol intake – even at levels often considered to be low – "is negatively associated with global brain volume measures, regional gray matter volumes, and white matter microstructure" and these associations become stronger as alcohol intake increases.

Alcohol related brain damage is not only due to the direct toxic effects of alcohol; alcohol withdrawal, nutritional deficiency, electrolyte disturbances, and liver damage are also believed to contribute to alcohol-related brain damage.

=== Binge drinking ===
Binge drinking, or heavy episodic drinking, can lead to damage in the limbic system that occurs after a relatively short period of time. This brain damage increases the risk of alcohol-related dementia, and abnormalities in mood and cognitive abilities. Binge drinkers also have an increased risk of developing chronic alcoholism. Alcoholism is a chronic relapsing disorder that can include extended periods of abstinence followed by relapse to heavy drinking. It is also associated with many other health problems including memory disorders, high blood pressure, muscle weakness, heart problems, anaemia, low immune function, liver disease, disorders of the digestive system, and pancreatic problems. It has also been correlated with depression, unemployment, and family problems with an increased risk of domestic abuse.

It is unclear how the frequency and length of binge drinking sessions impacts brain damage in humans. Humans who drank at least 100 drinks (male) or 80 drinks (female) per month (concentrated to 21 occasions or less per month) throughout a three-year period had impaired decision-making skills compared to non-binge drinkers.

=== Thiamine deficiency ===
Thiamine is a vitamin the body needs for growth, development, and cellular function, as well as converting food into energy. Thiamine is naturally present in some foods, added to some food products, and available as a dietary supplement. A nutritional deficiency in thiamine can worsen alcohol-related brain damage. There is a genetic component to thiamine deficiency that causes intestinal malabsorption. A nutritional vitamin deficiency state that is caused by thiamine deficiency which is seen most commonly in alcoholics leads to Wernicke's encephalopathy and Alcoholic Korsakoff syndrome (AKS) which frequently occur simultaneously, known as Wernicke–Korsakoff syndrome (WKS). This disorder is preventable through supplementation of the diet by thiamine and an awareness by health professionals to treat 'at risk' patients with thiamine. Thiamine deficiency may occur in upwards of 80% of patients with alcoholism however, only ≈13% of such individuals develop WKS, raising the possibility that a genetic predisposition to WKS may exist in some individuals. Lesions, or brain abnormalities, are typically located in the diencephalon which result in anterograde and retrograde amnesia, or memory loss.

== Mechanisms of action ==
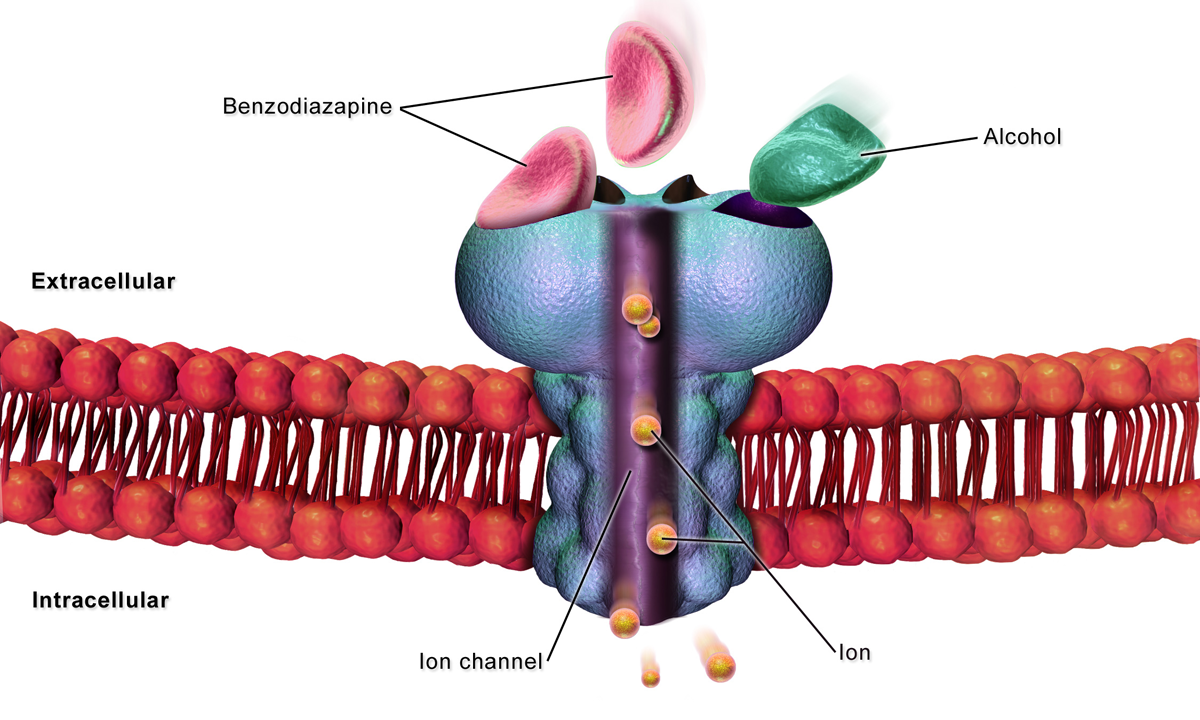
GABA-A receptor embedded in cell membrane

Alcohol affects the brain through multiple mechanisms. The cerebral atrophy that alcoholics often present with is due to alcohol induced neurotoxicity. Evidence of neurodegeneration can be supported by an increased microglia density and expression of proinflammatory cytokines in the brain. Animal studies find that heavy and regular binge drinking causes neurodegeneration in corticolimbic brain regions areas which are involved in learning and spatial memory. The corticolimbic brain regions affected include the olfactory bulb, piriform cortex, perirhinal cortex, entorhinal cortex, and the hippocampal dentate gyrus. It was found that a heavy two-day drinking binge caused extensive neurodegeneration in the entorhinal cortex with resultant learning deficits in rats. Alcohol abuse affects neurons in the frontal cortex that typically have a large soma, or cell body. This type of neuron is more susceptible to Alzheimer's disease and normal aging. Research is still being conducted to determine whether there is a direct link between excessive alcohol consumption and Alzheimer's disease. The volume of the corpus callosum, a large white matter tract that connects the two cerebral hemispheres, is shown to decrease with alcohol abuse due to a loss of myelination. This integration between the two cerebral hemispheres and cognitive function is affected. A limited amount of myelin can be restored with alcohol abstinence, leading to transient neurological deficits.

The endocrine system includes the hypothalamic–pituitary–adrenal axis, the hypothalamic–pituitary–gonadal axis, the hypothalamic–pituitary–thyroid axis, the hypothalamic–pituitary–growth hormone/insulin-like growth factor-1 axis, and the hypothalamic–posterior pituitary axis, as well as other sources of hormones, such as the endocrine pancreas and endocrine adipose tissue. Alcohol abuse disrupts all of these systems and causes hormonal disturbances that may result in various disorders, such as stress intolerance, reproductive dysfunction, thyroid problems, immune abnormalities, and psychological and behavioral disorders.

Higher order functioning of the cerebral cortex is organized by the cerebellum. In those with cerebral atrophy, Purkinje cells, or the cerebellar output neurons, in the vermis are reduced in number by 43%. This large reduction in Purkinje cells causes a decrease in high order cerebral cortex organization. The cerebellum is also responsible for refining crude motor output from the primary motor cortex. When this refinement is missing, symptoms such as unsteadiness and ataxia will present. A potential cause of chronic alcoholic cerebellar dysfunction is an alteration of GABA-A receptor. This dysfunction causes an increase in the neurotransmitter GABA in cerebellar Purkinje cells, granule cells, and interneurons leading to a disruption in normal cell signaling.

An MRI brain scan found that levels of N-acetylaspartate (NAA), a metabolite biomarker for neural integrity, was lower in binge drinkers. Additionally, abnormal brain metabolism, a loss of white brain matter in the frontal lobe, and higher parietal gray matter NAA levels were found. This shows a correlation between binge drinking, poor executive functioning, and working memory. A decrease in frontal lobe NAA levels is associated with impaired executive functioning and processing speed in neuro-performance tests.

=== Neuroinflammation ===
Ethanol can trigger the activation of astroglial cells which can produce a proinflammatory response in the brain. Ethanol interacts with the TLR4 and IL-1RI receptors on these cells to activate intracellular signal transduction pathways. Specifically, ethanol induces the phosphorylation of IL-1R-associated kinase (IRAK), ERK1/2, stress-activated protein kinase (SAPK)/JNK, and p38 mitogen-activated protein kinase (p38 MAPK). Activation of the IRAK/MAPK pathway leads to the stimulation of the transcription factors NF-kappaB and AP-1. These transcription factors cause the upregulation of inducible nitric oxide synthase (iNOS) and cyclooxygenase-2 (COX-2) expression. The upregulation of these inflammatory mediators by ethanol is also associated with an increase in caspase 3 activity and a corresponding increase in cell apoptosis. The exact mechanism by which various concentrations of ethanol either activates or inhibits TLR4/IL-1RI signaling is not currently known, though it may involve alterations in lipid raft clustering or cell adhesion complexes and actin cytoskeleton organization.

=== Changes in dopaminergic and glutamatergic signaling pathways ===
Intermittent ethanol treatment causes a decrease in expression of the dopamine receptor type 2 (D2R) and a decrease in phosphorylation of 2B subunit of the NMDA receptor (NMDAR2B) in the prefrontal cortex, hippocampus, nucleus accumbens, and for only D2R in the striatum. It also causes changes in the acetylation of histones H3 and H4 in the prefrontal cortex, nucleus accumbens, and striatum, suggesting chromatin remodeling changes which may mediate long-term alterations. Additionally, adolescent rats pre-exposed to ethanol have higher basal levels of dopamine in the nucleus accumbens, along with a prolonged dopamine response in this area in response to a challenge dose of ethanol. Together, these results suggest that alcohol exposure during adolescence can sensitize the mesolimbic and mesocortical dopamine pathways to cause changes in dopaminergic and glutamatergic signaling, which may affect the remodeling and functions of the adolescent brain. These changes are significant as alcohol’s effect on NMDARs could contribute to learning and memory dysfunction (see Effects of alcohol on memory).

=== Inhibition of hippocampal neurogenesis ===
Excessive alcohol intake (binge drinking) causes a decrease in hippocampal neurogenesis, via decreases in neural stem cell proliferation and newborn cell survival. Alcohol decreases the number of cells in S-phase of the cell cycle, and may arrest cells in the G1 phase, thus inhibiting their proliferation. Ethanol has different effects on different types of actively dividing hippocampal progenitors during their initial phases of neuronal development. Chronic alcohol exposure decreases the number of proliferating cells that are radial glia-like, preneuronal, and intermediate types, while not affecting early neuronal type cells; suggesting ethanol treatment alters the precursor cell pool. Furthermore, there is a greater decrease in differentiation and immature neurons than there is in proliferating progenitors, suggesting that the abnormal decrease in the percentage of actively dividing preneuronal progenitors results in a greater reduction in the maturation and survival of postmitotic cells.

Additionally, alcohol exposure increased several markers of cell death. In these studies neural degeneration seems to be mediated by non-apoptotic pathways. One of the proposed mechanisms for alcohol's neurotoxicity is the production of nitric oxide (NO), yet other studies have found alcohol-induced NO production to lead to apoptosis (see Neuroinflammation section).

=== Kindling and excitotoxicity ===
Repeated detoxifications ("kindling") can worsen withdrawal symptoms and amplify brain damage through hyperexcitability and excitotoxicity, leading to more severe cognitive and emotional dysfunction over time, particularly in the prefrontal cortex. Animal studies show that repeated alcohol withdrawals are associated with a significantly impaired ability to learn new information. Alcohol's acute effects on GABAergic enhancement and NMDA suppression cause alcohol induced neurotoxicity, or worsening of alcohol withdrawal symptoms with each subsequent withdrawal period. This may cause CNS depression leading to acute tolerance to these withdrawal effects. This tolerance is followed by a damaging rebound effect during withdrawal. This rebound causes hyperexcitability of neurotransmission systems. If this hyperexcitability state occurs multiple times, kindling and neurotoxicity can occur leading to increased alcohol-related brain damage. Damaging excitotoxicity may also occur as a result of repeated withdrawals. Similar to people who have gone through multiple detoxifications, binge drinkers show a higher rate of emotional disturbance due to these damaging effects.

=== Epigenetic changes ===
Long-term, the effects of chronic hazardous alcohol use are thought to be due to stable alterations of gene expression resulting from epigenetic changes within particular regions of the brain. For example, in rats exposed to alcohol for up to 5 days, there was an increase in histone 3 lysine 9 acetylation in the pronociceptin promoter in the brain amygdala complex. This acetylation is an activating mark for pronociceptin. The nociceptin/nociceptin opioid receptor system is involved in the reinforcing or conditioning effects of alcohol.

== Diagnosis ==
Neurological impairment related to alcohol is typically diagnosed through clinical history, neuropsychological testing, neuroimaging, and laboratory tests. Differential diagnosis includes other causes of dementia, psychiatric disorders, and traumatic brain injury. Modern neuroimaging techniques in particular have revolutionized the understanding of alcohol-related brain damage. The two main imaging methods are hemodynamic and electromagnetic. These techniques have allowed for the study of the functional, biochemical, and anatomical changes of the brain due to prolonged alcohol abuse. Neuroimaging provides valuable information in determining the risk an individual has for developing alcohol dependence and the efficacy of potential treatment.

In Korsakoff patients, MRI shows atrophy of the thalamus and mamillary bodies. PET showed decreased metabolism, and therefore decreased activity in the thalamus and other diencephalon structures. Uncomplicated alcoholics, those with chronic Wernicke's encephalopathy (WE), and Korsakoff psychosis showed significant neuronal loss in the frontal cortex, white matter, hippocampus, and basal forebrain. Uncomplicated alcoholics were seen to have a shrinkage in raphe neurons, the mamillary bodies, and the thalamus.

=== Hemodynamic methods ===
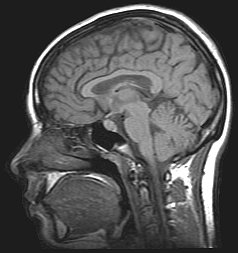
Parasagittal render of human brain with MRI

Hemodynamic methods record changes in blood volume, blood flow, blood oxygenation, and energy metabolism to produce images. Positron emission tomography (PET) and single-photon emission computed tomography (SPECT) are common techniques that require the injection of a radioactively labeled molecule, such as glucose, to allow for proper visualization. After injection, the patient is then observed while performing mental tasks, such as a memory task. PET and SPECT studies have confirmed and expanded previous findings stating that the prefrontal cortex is particularly susceptible to decreased metabolism in alcohol abusing patients.

Magnetic resonance imaging (MRI) and functional magnetic resonance imaging (fMRI) are other commonly used tenichiques. These methods are noninvasive, and have no radioactive risk involved. The fMRI method records the metabolic changes in a particular brain structure or region during a mental task. To detect damage to white matter, the standard MRI is not sufficient. An MRI derivative technique known as diffusion tensor imaging (DTI) is used to determine the orientation and integrity of specific nerve pathways, allowing the detection of damage. When imaging those with alcoholism, the DTI results show that heavy drinking disrupts the microstructure of nerve fibers.

=== Electromagnetic methods ===
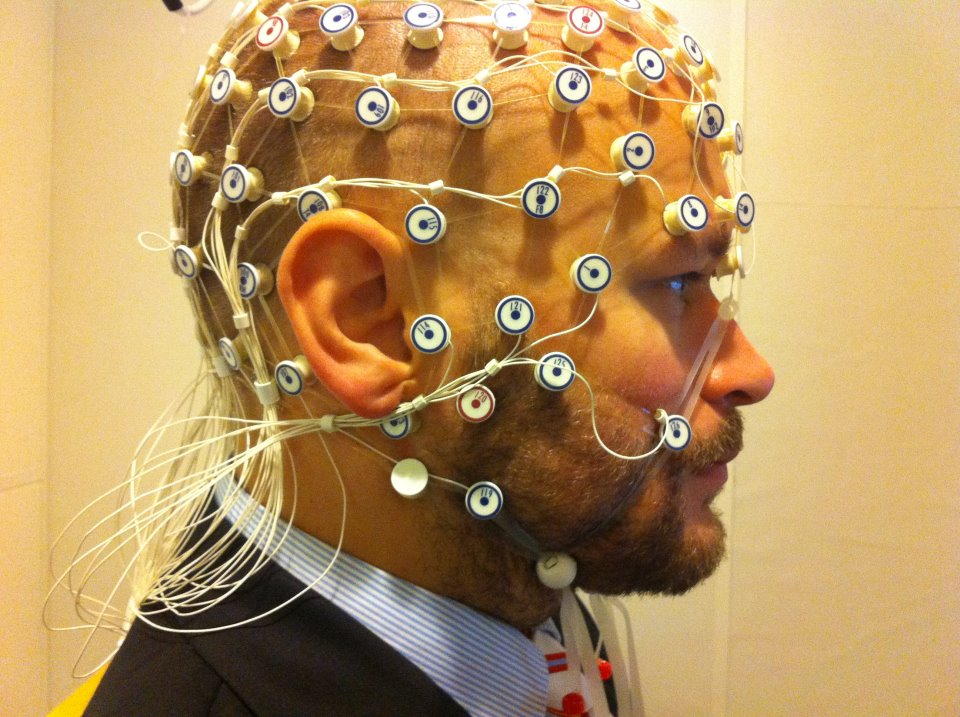
Man ready for EEG recording

While the hemo-dynamic methods are effective for observing spatial and chemical changes, they cannot show the time course of these changes. Electromagnetic imaging methods are capable of capturing real-time changes in the brain's electrical currents.Electroencephalography (EEG) imaging utilizes small electrodes that are attached to the scalp. The recordings are averaged by a technique known as event-related potentials (ERP). This is done to determine the time sequence of activity after being exposed to a stimulus, such as a word or image.

These neuroimaging methods have found that alcohol alters the nervous system on multiple levels. This includes impairment of lower order brainstem functions and higher order functioning, such as problem solving. These methods have also shown differences in electrical brain activity and responsiveness when comparing alcohol-dependent and healthy individuals.

== Prevention ==
Primary prevention strategies include limiting alcohol intake in accordance with health guidelines, nutritional supplementation in at-risk individuals (especially thiamine), and early intervention for alcohol use disorder. Education on the prevention of alcoholism is the best supported method of avoiding alcohol-related brain damage. By providing information that studies have found on risk factors and the mechanisms of damage, the efforts to find an effective treatment may increase. This may also reduce mortality by influencing doctors to pay closer attention to the warning signs.

== Treatment ==
Treatment approaches include stopping alcohol use, thiamine and multivitamin supplementation, cognitive-behavioral therapy targeting memory, executive function, and motivation, and medications like naltrexone or acamprosate to aid in maintaining abstinence. Management of comorbid psychiatric conditions is also essential. Many negative physiologic consequences of alcoholism are reversible during abstinence. As an example, long-term chronic alcoholics suffer a variety of cognitive deficiencies. However, multiyear abstinence resolves most neurocognitive deficits, except for some lingering deficits in spatial processing.

Alcohol-related brain damage can have drastic effects on the individuals affected and their loved ones. The options for treatment are very limited compared to other disorders. Although limited, most patients with alcohol-related cognitive deficits experienced slight improvement of their symptoms over the first two to three months of treatment. Others have said to see increase in cerebral metabolism as soon as one month after treatment.

== Outcomes ==
Some consequences of frequent long-term drinking are not reversible with abstinence. Alcohol craving (compulsive need to consume alcohol) is frequently present long-term among alcoholics. Among 461 individuals who sought help for alcohol problems, followup was provided for up to 16 years. By 16 years, 54% of those who tried to remain abstinent without professional help had relapsed, and 39% of those who tried to remain abstinent with help had relapsed.

== Epidemiology ==
Nearly half of American alcoholics exhibit "neuropsychological disabilities [that] can range from mild to severe" with approximately two million requiring lifelong care after developing permanent and debilitating conditions. Prolonged alcohol abstinence can lead to an improvement in these disabilities. For those with mild impairments, some improvement has been seen within a year, but this can take much longer in those with higher severity damage.

== History ==
Recognition of alcohol's neurotoxic effects dates back to the 19th century. The identification of Wernicke’s encephalopathy and Korsakoff’s psychosis linked alcohol to specific brain disorders. Advances in neuroimaging in the late 20th century further clarified the structural impact of chronic alcohol use.

== Society and culture ==
Alcohol use is deeply embedded in many cultures, and moderate consumption is often socially acceptable or even encouraged. However, stigma surrounds alcohol use disorder and alcohol-related cognitive impairment, complicating public health messaging.

Economic costs associated with alcohol-related brain damage include healthcare expenses, lost productivity, caregiving burdens, and the need to rely on others for quality of life.

== Special populations ==
=== Adolescents ===
Consuming large amounts of alcohol over a period of time can impair normal brain development in humans. Deficits in retrieval of verbal and nonverbal information and in visuospatial functioning were evident in youths with histories of heavy drinking during early and middle adolescence.

During adolescence critical stages of neurodevelopment occur, including remodeling and functional changes in synaptic plasticity and neuronal connectivity in different brain regions. These changes may make adolescents especially susceptible to the harmful effects of alcohol. Compared to adults, adolescents exposed to alcohol are more likely to exhibit cognitive deficits (including learning and memory dysfunction). Some of these cognitive effects, such as learning impairments, may persist into adulthood.

The impulsivity and sensation seeking seen in adolescence may lead to increased alcohol intake and more frequent binge drinking episodes leaving adolescents particularly at risk for alcoholism. The still developing brain of adolescents is more vulnerable to the damaging neurotoxic and neurodegenerative effects of alcohol. "High impulsivity has [also] been found in families with alcoholism, suggestive of a genetic link. Thus, the genetics of impulsivity overlaps with genetic risks for alcohol use disorder and possibly alcohol neurodegeneration".

Adolescents are much more vulnerable to alcohol-related brain damage in the form of persistent changes in neuroimmune signalling from binge drinking.

=== Genetics and family history ===
Gender and parental history of alcoholism and binge drinking has an influence on susceptibility to alcohol dependence as higher levels are typically seen in males and in those with a family history.

There is also a genetic risk for proinflammatory cytokine mediated alcohol-related brain damage. There is evidence that variants of these genes are involved not only in contributing to brain damage but also to impulsivity and alcohol abuse. All three of these genetic traits contribute heavily to an alcohol use disorder.
