= Drugs and sexual consent =

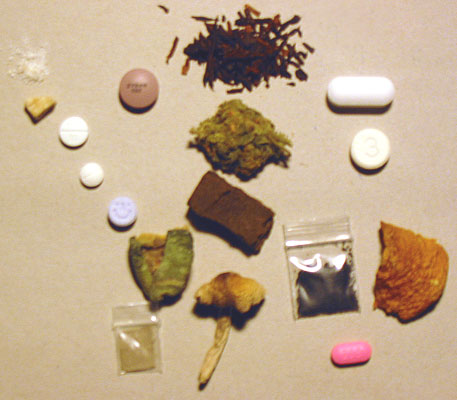
Psychoactive drugs

Drugs and sexual consent is a topic that discusses the impacts of drugs on sexual activity that lead to changes in sexual consent. Sexual consent is the voluntary agreement to engage in sexual activity, which is essential in preventing sexual violence. Consent can be communicated verbally or nonverbally and should be freely offered. However, drug use, particularly psychoactive drugs (i.e. alcohol and some other drugs) that alter mental processes, can affect people's decision-making and consent communication ability, potentially impacting the autonomous aspect of sexual consent.

The definition of sexual consent, "agreement to engage in sexual activity", highlights that willingness is equivalent to consent and desire is equal to "wantedness", though they are not always related. Therefore, individuals can provide consent for sex even if they do not necessarily desire it, making the boundary of "sexual consent" unclear. The situation complicates the legitimate judgment of sexual violence, blurring the line between consensual sex and rape when the accuser is severely intoxicated and cannot clearly express disagreement.

Most studies on drug and sexual consent are based on self-reports that emphasize the psychological and sociological aspects, while the direct biological mechanisms remain largely unexplored. However, the indirect physiological effects of drugs on sexual consent, such as impaired cognition and judgment, may lead to changes in sexual behavior and affect sexual consent.

== Psychological and sociological aspects ==
A study demonstrated three ways drugs could affect sexual consent in psychological and sociological aspects.

=== Increased perceived sexual autonomy ===
Perceived sexual autonomy

Drugs could improve the autonomous aspect of sexual consent, thus raising the tendency of the user to engage in both desired and undesired sex.

Firstly, drug use may diminish cognitive issues that keep people from engaging in sexual behaviors. This includes removing impediments to sexual activity, such as social conventions, religious beliefs, and sexual guilt. For some individuals, drug-taking is necessary for them to participate in homosexual sex, which frees them from a sense of taboo.

Through expanding user's sexual boundaries and limitations, drug also improves people's participation in different varieties of sex, including those that are previously undesired. Some claimed that they would consent to have sex that they would not try in sobriety, for example, BDSM, role play, and use of sex toys.

Individuals on drugs reported feelings of intimacy, trust, love, and a strong desire to have sex with multiple sexual partners. Due to the symbolic nature of closeness and trust, drug use may also boost a desire to engage in sex without using condoms. Once the effects of the drugs wear off, these emotional attachments may fade away, leading to emotions of regret.

=== Others' perception of drug users being sexually available ===
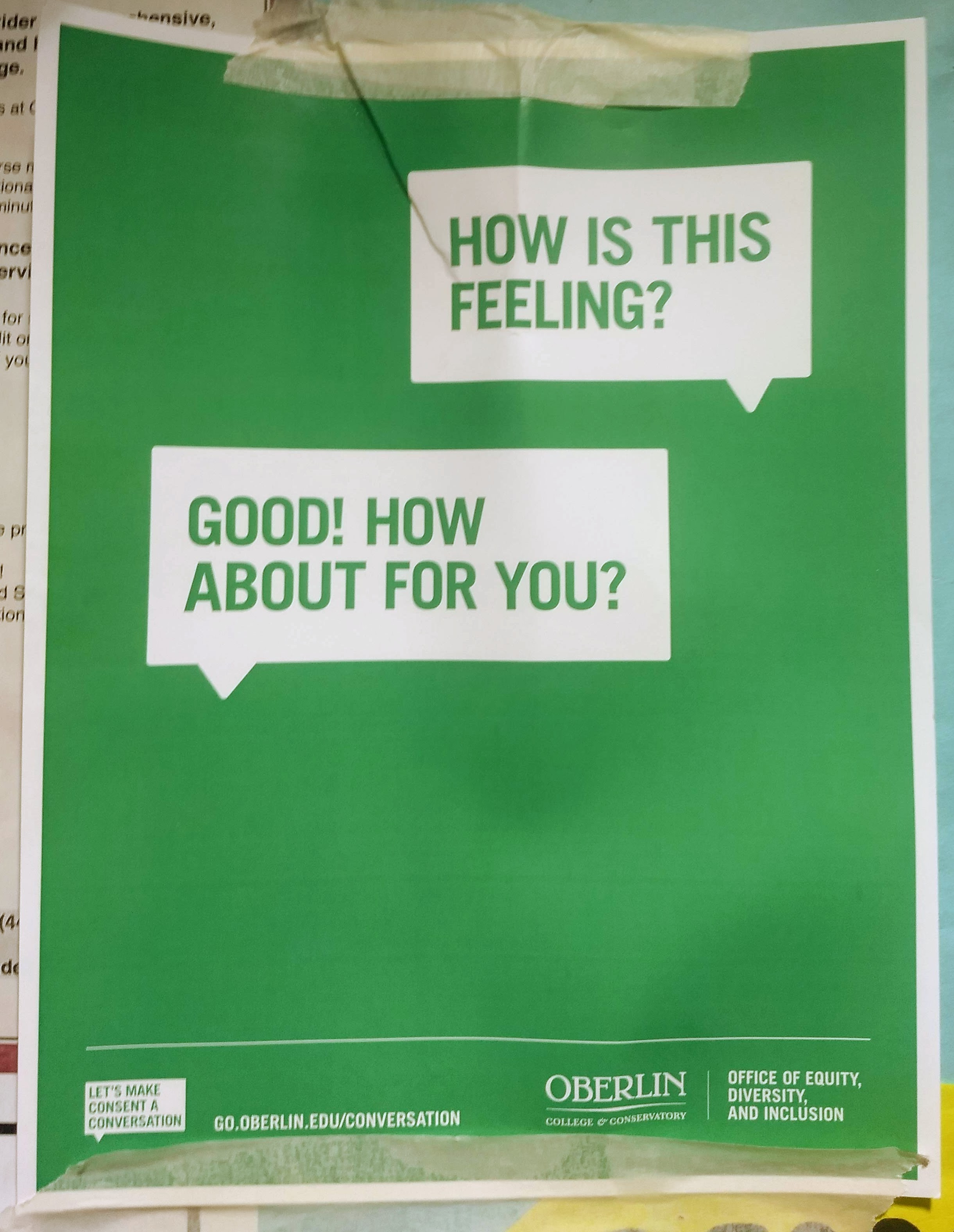
Consent

Individuals on drugs claimed to be viewed by others as sexually available, that is, more likely to provide consent to engage in sexual activities. Two fundamental presumptions appeared to be connected to this impression. (1) People believe using drugs makes it simpler to persuade others to engage in sexual activity as drugs have a reputation for promoting sexual pleasure, making men perceive women on drugs as "horny" and more sexually available. (2) Drug users are also thought to be prepared to offer sex trade for drugs, implying a sense of reciprocity between these transactions. Despite their initial reluctance, women often provide sex in return for drugs, with 57% of opiate users reported receiving drugs or money in return for sex. Unlike buying drugs with cash, the sex-bought method is often implicit with unspecific pricing standards. People are less likely to relate implicit exchange with predicted bad outcomes, so they are more likely to encourage the behavior than explicit trades.

=== Minimize the capability to communicate consent ===
Several studies have found that significant drug use can impair or change judgment, resulting in irrationality and overexcitability during drug-related sexual conduct. This might be due to people focusing on achieving orgasm regardless of their sexual partner's experience. Some drugs impair sexual awareness, making it harder to make sexual decisions. The meaningfulness of consent made by a high individual on the verge of passing out was challenged. People on drugs are more "suggestible". In other words, they are more willing to obey their sexual partner's orders.

Drugs also impair the capability to communicate sexual consent. Those who used marijuana reported an inability to speak out or oppose sexual behaviors though cognitively reluctant. Narcotics can also impair muscular control, making it difficult to indicate no through body language.

== Biological activity of drugs ==
Although it is commonly believed that recreational drugs act as aphrodisiacs and serve as preludes to sexual activities, their specific mechanisms remain to be explored. Various models have been composed to imitate the drug kinetics of these drugs on sex. However, most drug-sex study data were collected from small sample interviews and self-reports. Social environment, drug dosage, duration of use, and user characteristics are other factors that should be considered.

The section focuses on discussing several most used recreational drugs. Methamphetamine, which has more direct studies on its biological mechanism of sexual consent, is also explained.

=== Alcohol ===
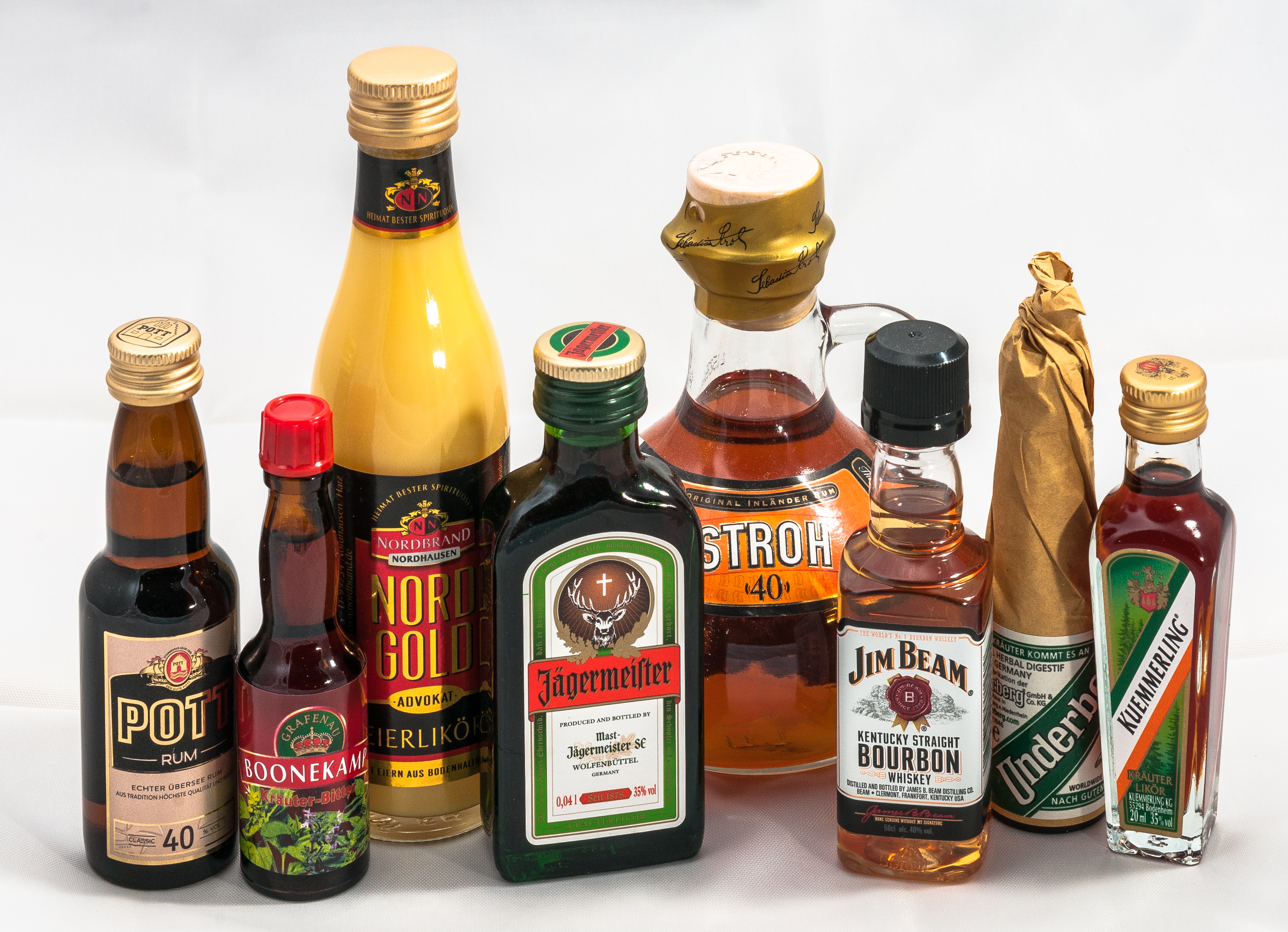
Alcohol

Alcohol is a depressant and a psychoactive drug that can alter human behavior. The views of alcohol on sexual consent vary significantly. Alcohol is frequently seen as a significant sexual facilitator, disinhibitor, and possibly an aphrodisiac. It often precedes and facilitates sexual activity in social settings, encouraging people to be more receptive to sex. Similar to other drugs, people who drink are often seen as being more sexually available and more seductive after drinking.

However, other studies suggest excessive alcohol may have negative effects on sex. Alcohol can interfere with the release of sexual hormones, such as testosterone, estrogen, and progesterone, possibly stifling sexual arousal. It can also directly affect blood flow or other physiological processes in sexual organs. It has been hypothesized that alcohol's depressive effects on the central nervous system (CNS) may cause erectile dysfunction, decreased vaginal secretions, diminished sexual responsiveness, and other sexual dysfunctions. The physiological response to sex decreases with alcohol consumption in women, despite increasing self-reporting sexual desire and ability to reach sexual orgasm. In addition, the neurotransmitter gamma-aminobutyric acid (GABA), which blocks impulse transmission, is most prominently increased by alcohol. High blood alcohol level increases its activity in the spinal cord potentially causing drowsiness, making it more difficult to communicate sexual consent.

THC

=== Marijuana ===
Marijuana, also known as cannabis, is of the highest consumption in the recreational drug market. 70% of marijuana consumers viewed it as an aphrodisiac and 81% increased sexual delight and satisfaction. However, limited physiological evidence indicates that it stimulates sexual desire or improves sexual function. Most evidence suggests the link between the two is indirect. Delta-9-tetrahydrocannabinol (THC), the primary psychoactive component of marijuana, has a similar structure to the neurotransmitter anandamide. THC can target the hippocampus and orbitofrontal cortex to affect memory formation and induce hallucinations. It also influences feelings of pleasure, sensation, and other cognitive functions. In addition, high THC dosage impairs basic motor control and reactions. The ability to communicate consent after initiating sexual activities decreases while intoxicated. However, the mechanisms of the self-reports effect of marijuana to promote sexual enjoyment are still unclear. This stimulation could result from a general improvement in sensory experience.

Heroin

=== Opioid ===
Opioids, such as heroin, are the world's second most popular drug. They are CNS depressants that relieve pain and induce sedation. Some users describe a rush of euphoria after using the drug similar to sexual orgasms. Due to the ability to delay orgasm, muscle relaxation, and analgesic effects, opioid is also used in self-medication for sexual dysfunctions such as premature ejaculation in males or dyspareunia in female. However, long-term opioid use can influence the neuroendocrine system, inhibiting gonadotropin-releasing hormones to decrease libido and lower testosterone levels in men.

Previous research has been limited to self-report studies. However, opioid sedation can impair cognitive function, potentially impairing judgment about sexual boundaries and consent. It can also alter pain perception and pleasure, affecting drug-users' ability to assess their comfort level accurately during sexual activity.

=== Methamphetamine ===
Methamphetamine

Methamphetamine (MA) is a potent stimulant impacting the CNS. From self-report studies, It has been found to enhance sexual desire, promote pleasure, and delay orgasm. However, methamphetamine use is greatly associated with high-risk sexual behaviors and reduction in sexual inhibition. Methamphetamine can increase the likelihood of engaging in atypical sexually behaviors, such as pedophilia, group sex, and same-sex intercourse among heterosexual individuals.

One issue related to sexual consent concerns whether agreement is made under conscious conditions. Methamphetamine abuse is linked to neurotoxicity in the brain and has deleterious effects on cognitive processes, for example, deficits in episodic memory, executive functioning, information processing speed, motor skills, and language abilities. The impairment of cognitive ability could thus lead to diminished capability to provide informed and enthusiastic consent.

Furthermore, Methamphetamine users have been found to differ from non-users in high-risk behavior related neurocognitive decision-making processes. This research reveals the weaker activation of the risk and reward-modulating regions in brains of casual drug users. As the system is responsible for handling risks and rewards, neurological differences suggest that during decision-making, methamphetamine users may be less concerned about the potential risks associated with a choice. Instead, they may focus more on the potential gains and immediate outcomes. This could explain why methamphetamine users may engage in high-risk sexual behaviors or have sex with partners who they would not in sobriety. They only consider the immediate pleasure rather than long-term risks.

Animal studies confirm that methamphetamine and sexual behavior activate the same neurons in the CNS responsible for motivation and reward. Methamphetamine and sexual behavior are considered as "rewards" that trigger the release of dopamine, causing feelings of pleasure and satisfaction. These pleasurable feelings in turn acts as a motivation again, encouraging people to compulsively seek natural rewards. In sum, this co-activation of neuronal populations suggests that methamphetamine use leads to compulsive seeking of natural rewards, in this case, sexual behavior, proving the drug heightens sexual consent autonomy.

== Drug-facilitated sexual assault (DFSA) ==
Drugs do not only affect one's decision on sexual consent but also cause a loss of ability to express it. Date rape drugs including ethanol, benzodiazepines, gamma-hydroxybutyrate, and ketamine are frequently used in facilitating sexual assault.

=== Ethanol ===
Ethanol is sometimes used as a date rape drug, as it can cause amnesia, impaired motor coordination, and mental confusion, all of which can aid the actions of sexual predators.

=== Benzodiazepines ===
Benzodiazepines are medications used to treat anxiety, stress, and insomnia. When the drug binds to the GABA receptor, sedation and muscle relaxation occurs. Flunitrazepam is a common benzodiazepine used in rape facilitation since it causes memory blackouts.

=== Ketamine ===
Ketamine is a dissociative anesthetic often used recreatonally for its euphoric and hallucinogenic tendencies. The drug induces dissociation in the brain, which is the separation or disconnection in activities between the thalamus and limbic systems. In high doses, ketamine causes amnesia, inability to speak, and loss of consciousness, facilitating sexual abuse.

=== Gamma-hydroxybutyrate (GHB) ===
GHB have a chemical structure similar to neurotransmitter GABA. It is commonly used as a date rape drug due to its euphoric and CNS depressant effects which can slow down brain activity. Additionally, individuals may experience poor concentration and confusion after taking GHB.

== Application ==
Drug-taking was found to impact the capacity to make sexual decisions, raise engagement in anal intercourse, willingness to have multiple sex partners, and decreased condom usage. This increases susceptibility to sex-related health issues and associated harms, including HIV and venereal disease.

A key aspect of harm reduction is educating those who might use sex-related drugs about the consequences of doing so, and encouraging them to evaluate their possible sexual partners. Public education about drugs and sexual consent could also lessen victim-blaming beliefs and increase social support. Due to a lack of knowledge and education regarding sexual consent-related issues, bar industry employees have found it challenging to stop sexual harassment. Implementing policies and prevention strategies could be aided by future education initiatives, like bystander prevention. However, many nightclubs claimed to have "zero-tolerance" drug usage policies, making it difficult to provide instruction without seeming to support drug use.
