= Lucas' reagent =

Chemical reagent used to differentiate 1°, 2°, 3° Alcohols

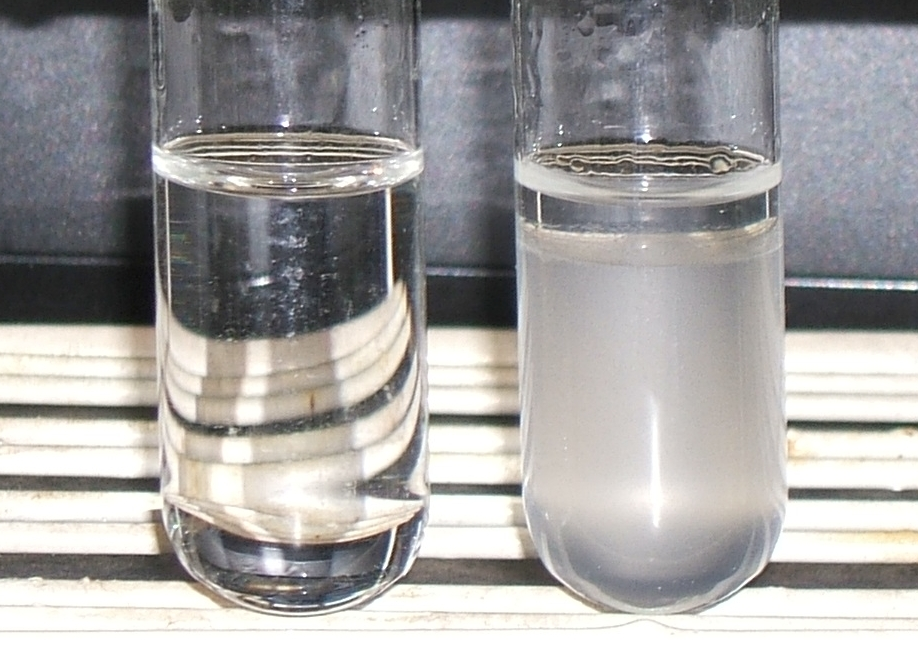
Lucas test: negative (left) with ethanol and positive with t-butanol

"Lucas' reagent" is a solution of anhydrous zinc chloride in concentrated hydrochloric acid. This solution is used to classify alcohols of low molecular weight. The reaction is a substitution in which the chloride replaces a hydroxyl group. A positive test is indicated by a change from clear and colourless to turbid, signalling formation of a chloroalkane. Also, the best results for this test are observed in tertiary alcohols, as they form the respective alkyl halides fastest due to higher stability of the intermediate tertiary carbocation. The test was reported in 1930 and became a standard method in qualitative organic chemistry. The test has since become somewhat obsolete with the availability of various spectroscopic and chromatographic methods of analysis. It was named after Howard Lucas (1885–1963).

== Lucas test ==
The Lucas test in alcohols is a test to differentiate between primary, secondary, and tertiary alcohols. It is based on the difference in reactivity of the three classes of alcohols with hydrogen halides via an S_{N}1 reaction:

$\text{(CH}_3\text{)}_3\text{COH} + \text{HCl} \rightarrow \text{(CH}_3\text{)}_3\text{CCl} + \text{H}_2\text{O}$

The differing reactivity reflects the differing ease of formation of the corresponding carbocations. Tertiary carbocations are far more stable than secondary carbocations, and primary carbocations are the least stable(due to hyperconjugation).

An equimolar mixture of ZnCl_{2} and concentrated HCl is the reagent. The alcohol is protonated, the H_{2}O group formed leaves, forming a carbocation, and the nucleophile Cl^{−} (which is present in excess) readily attacks the carbocation, forming the chloroalkane. Tertiary alcohols react immediately with Lucas reagent as evidenced by turbidity owing to the low solubility of the organic chloride in the aqueous mixture. Secondary alcohols react within five or so minutes (depending on their solubility). Primary alcohols do not react appreciably with Lucas reagent at room temperature. Hence, the time taken for turbidity to appear is a measure of the reactivity of the class of alcohol, and this time difference is used to differentiate among the three classes of alcohols:

- no visible reaction at room temperature and forming an oily layer only on heating: primary, such as 1-pentanol
- solution forms oily layer in 3–5 minutes: secondary, such as 2-pentanol
- solution forms an oily layer immediately: tertiary, such as 2-methyl-2-butanol

The Lucas test is usually an alternative to the oxidation test - which is used to identify primary and secondary alcohols.
