= Blackburn Hundred =

Former sub-division of Lancashire, England

Hundred of Blackburn
- Lancashire Hundred

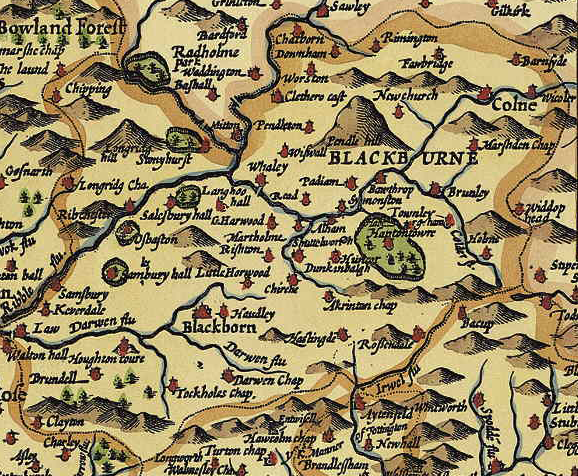
- Blackburn Hundred depicted in John Speed's 1610 map of Lancashire
- Area
  - 1831: 175,598 acres (711 km^{2})
  - Coordinates: 53.749°N 2.485°W
- History
  - Created: Before Domesday
  - Abolished: Mid-18th century, never formally abolished
- Status: Ancient Hundred
  - HQ: Blackburn then Clitheroe
- Subdivisions
  - Type: Parish(es)
  - Units: Blackburn, Whalley

Blackburn Hundred (also known as Blackburnshire) was a division of the historic county of Lancashire, in northern England. Its chief town was Blackburn, in the southwest of the hundred. It covered an area similar to modern East Lancashire, including the current districts of Ribble Valley (excluding the part north of the River Ribble and east of the Hodder, which was then in Yorkshire), Pendle (excluding West Craven, also in Yorkshire), Burnley, Rossendale, Hyndburn, Blackburn with Darwen, and South Ribble (east from Walton-le-dale and Lostock Hall).

Much of the area is hilly, bordering on the Pennines, with Pendle Hill in the midst of it, and was historically sparsely populated. It included several important royal forests. In the 18th century several towns in the area became industrialized and densely populated, including Blackburn itself, and Burnley.

== Early history ==
The shire probably originated as a county of the Kingdom of Northumbria, (Note: The Anglo-Saxon Chronicle mentions a battle at Whalley in Northumbria in 768) but was much fought over. In the Domesday Book it was among the hundreds between the Ribble and Mersey rivers ("Inter Ripam et Mersam" in the Domesday Book) that were included with the information about Cheshire, though they are now in Lancashire and cannot be said clearly to have then been part of Cheshire. (Note: According to Harris and Thacker: Certainly there were links between Cheshire and south Lancashire before 1000, when Wulfric Spot held lands in both territories. Wulfric's estates remained grouped together after his death, when they were left to his brother Aelfhelm, and indeed there still seems to have been some kind of connection in 1086, when south Lancashire was surveyed together with Cheshire by the Domesday commissioners. Nevertheless, the two territories do seem to have been distinguished from one another in some way and it is not certain that the shire-moot and the reeves referred to in the south Lancashire section of Domesday were the Cheshire ones.) (Note: According to Crosby: The Domesday Survey (1086) included south Lancashire with Cheshire for convenience, but the Mersey, the name of which means 'boundary river' is known to have divided the kingdoms of Northumbria and Mercia and there is no doubt that this was the real boundary.) The area may have been annexed to the embryonic Kingdom of England following the Battle of Brunanburh in 937.

The Domesday Book entry shows that before the Norman conquest, the hundred had been held directly by King Edward. It mentions royal holdings in Blackburn, Huncoat, Walton-le-Dale and Pendleton, and those of a church at Blackburn and St Mary's in Whalley. Also it talks of 28 freemen holding land as manors, but gives no further details about them. After the conquest Blackburnshire was part of a large area given to Roger de Poitou and he had demised it to Roger de Busli and Albert de Gresle.

The Domesday Book also mentions a sizable area of woodland. Two areas, the first being one league long and as wide, and another six long and four leagues wide, which could be as much as 225 square miles (583 km^{2}).

Later much of the east of the hundred was established as royal hunting grounds. Known as the forest of Blackburnshire, it was divided into the four forests of Accrington, Pendle, Trawden and Rossendale.

== Feudal period ==
At the start of the 12th century Roger de Poitou joined the failed rebellion against King Henry I in favor of his brother Robert Curthose, as a result losing his English holdings. In 1102 King Henry granted the whole of Blackburnshire and part of Amounderness to Robert de Lacy, the Lord of Pontefract, while confirming his possession of Bowland. These lands formed the basis of the Honour of Clitheroe. Subsequently most of the ancient parish of Ribchester, except the township of Alston-with-Hothersall, and in the ancient parish of Chipping, the vills of Aighton and Dutton and part of the forest of Bowland belonging ecclesiastically to the ancient parish of Great Mitton were annexed to Blackburnshire.

The separateness of the district was reinforced when it became a royal bailiwick in 1122. In 1182, it became part of the newly created County Palatine of Lancaster.

By 1243 it is believed that there were 57 manors in the hundred.

Those held in demesne were Colne, Great and Little Marsden, Briercliffe, Burnley, Ightenhill, Habergham, Padiham, Huncoat, Hapton, Accrington, Haslingden, Downham, Worston, Chatburn and Little Pendleton.

Those held by thegnage were: Twiston, (Note: Twiston and Livesey were held partly by thegnage and partly by knight's service.) Chipping, Thornley, Wheatley, Ribchester, Dutton, Dinckley, Henthorn, Wilpshire, Clayton-le-Dale, Salesbury, Osbaldeston, Samlesbury, Read, Simonstone, Oswaldtwistle, Livesey, Birtwistle, Church, Cliviger and Worsthorne.

Those held by knight's service were: Little Mitton, Wiswell, Hapton, Towneley, Coldcoats, Snodworth, Twiston, Extwistle, Aighton, Great Mearley, Livesey, Downham, Foulridge, Little Mearley, Rishton, Billington, Altham, Great Harwood, Clayton le Moors, and Walton in le Dale.

== Post medieval ==
Hundreds of Lancashire

The hundred of Blackburnshire continued to have administrative relevance until the abandonment of the system of hundreds in the early 19th century, long after feudalism ceased in England. As in other parts of England, the hundred was divided into parishes which were ecclesiastical parishes as well as being used for administrative purposes, like modern English civil parishes.

Early Blackburnshire had only two parishes, each covering a considerable but sparsely populated area. Whalley (now a much smaller parish) was the larger of the two, and covered the east of the hundred, while Blackburn parish covered the west. As mentioned above, the hundred was expanded to cover parts of the parishes of Chipping, Ribchester and Mitton. As Blackburnshire became more heavily populated and economically developed, the parishes of Whalley and Blackburn were split into many smaller parts over the centuries.

- The ancient parish of Blackburn contained Blackburn, Little Harwood, Ramsgreave, Salesbury, Clayton-le-Dale, Mellor, Witton, Pleasington, Over Darwen, Lower Darwen, Eccleshill, Tockholes, Livesey, Walton-Le-Dale, Cuerdale, Samlesbury, Balderston, Osbaldeston, Billington, Wilpshire, Dinckley, Great Harwood, Rishton. It also included Yate and Pickup Bank with extra-parochial status.
- The ancient parish of Whalley contained Whalley, Clitheroe, Chatburn, Worston, Mearley, Bowland-with-Leagram, Mitton, Henthorn and Coldcoats, Pendleton with Pendleton Hall, Standen And Standen Hey (Standen was extra-parochial), Wiswell, Church, Oswaldtwistle, Huncoat, Altham, Clayton-Le-Moors, Old Accrington, New Accrington, Haslingden, Higher Booths, Lower Booths, Henheads, Newchurch in Pendle, Burnley, Habergham Eaves, Briercliffe with Extwistle, Worsthorne with Hurstwood, Cliviger, Ightenhill Park (extra-parochial), Reedley Hallows, Filly Close and New Laund Booth (extra-parochial), Padiham, Simonstone, Read, Hapton, Higham with West Close Booth, Heyhouses (extra-parochial), Dunnockshaw (extra-parochial), Goldshaw Booth, Barley-with-Wheatley Booth, Roughlee Booth, Wheatley Carr Booth (extra-parochial), Old Laund Booth, Colne, Marsden, Barrowford Booth, Foulridge, Trawden, Downham, and Twiston.

Blackburn became a separate archdeaconry, splitting off from the archdeaconry of Manchester, in 1877, and becoming the Diocese of Blackburn in 1926.
