= Forest of Pendle =

Hilly area in eastern Lancashire, England

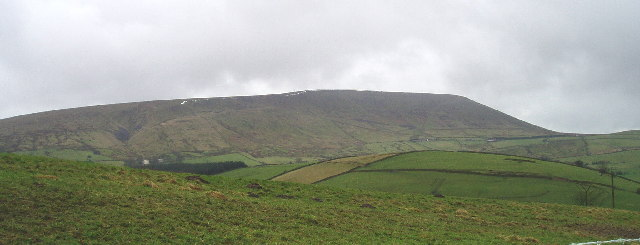
Pendle Hill, as seen from Pendle Forest.

The Forest of Pendle is a hilly area to the east of Pendle Hill in eastern Lancashire, roughly defining the watershed between the River Ribble and its tributary the River Calder. The area is not a forest in the modern sense of being heavily wooded, and has not been so for many centuries. Historically a somewhat larger area than the modern forest was one of the several royal forests of the area, under the control of Clitheroe Castle, or Honour of Clitheroe. Over its history, the forest has gone from being protected and regulated as a medieval royal forest, to being labelled as an Area of Outstanding Natural Beauty.

The forest is not coterminous to the modern local government district of Pendle, which is larger, and the modern version of the forest has come to contain areas to the north and east of Pendle Hill which are partly in the district of Ribble Valley.

== Medieval history ==
In 1086, at the time of the Domesday Book, Pendle forest was part of the extensive forests in Blackburnshire, in the eastern part of what would become Lancashire. The entire area between the rivers Ribble and Mersey had been granted by William the Conqueror to Roger the Poitevin, and he in turn had granted most of this area to the de Lacy family of Pontefract. It was they who apparently built Clitheroe Castle soon after. The Forest of Pendle was within their manor of Ightenhill.

Within the honour of Clitheroe, two sets of forests were administered separately, those of Bowland, and those of Blackburnshire. The Blackburnshire forest had four detached parts: Pendle, Trawden, Accrington and Rossendale.

As early as 1311 [the Forest of Pendle] was divided into eleven places of pasture for cows, of which the principal names, as they appear in a commission of Henry VII, are still preserved. The whole forest, formerly named Penhill vaccary, and sometimes the Chase of Penhill, was perambulated in person by the first Henry de Lacy; and about 1824, this ancient ceremony was repeated. In the 11th of Edward II, when Richard de Merclesden was master-forester of Blackburnshire, William de Tatham was warden or keeper of Pendle

Already during the Middle Ages under the de Lacys, the Forest of Pendle, like other forests, cattle started to be kept in the forest, and more agricultural development and settlement was allowed. There was also horse breeding and a deer park at Ightenhill.

Given in 1507 the names of these pastures or vaccaries where recorded as:

West Close and Hunterholme (Higham with West Close Booth)
Heigham Boothe (Higham with West Close Booth)
Newelawnde (Reedley Hallows)
Bareley Boothe (Barley-with-Wheatley Booth)
Heigham Close olim Nether-heigham (Higham with West Close Booth)
Overgouldeshey and Nethergouldeshey (Goldshaw Booth)
Feelie Close (Reedley Hallows)
Oldlawnde (Old Laund Booth)
Whitley Carre (Old Laund Booth)
Over Barrowforde and Nether Barrowforde (Blacko and Barrowford)
Over Rouglee and Nether Rouglee, al Rouglee Boothes (Roughlee Booth)
Hawebothe and Whitley in Habothe (Barley-with-Wheatley Booth)
Redhalowes (Reedley Hallows and Burnley)

The general area suffered from Scottish attacks after the English defeat in the Battle of Bannockburn, but Pendle suffered particularly after its lord Thomas, 2nd Earl of Lancaster was executed for rebellion against the king.

== Early modern history ==
From Tudor times the forests began to be sold off to private holders with increased rights, and Pendle was developed further than it had been previously.

Pendle Forest, like all the forests of Blackburnshire, was once entirely contained within the ancient parish of Whalley, which was much larger than modern versions of that parish. Newchurch in Pendle became the chapel of the forest, and eventually became the recognised centre of a parish.

Other townships which developed within the ancient forest include Barley, Barrowford, Blacko, Fence, Reedley, Roughlee, Higham and Wheatley Lane.

== The modern forest ==
Today Pendle Forest is no longer a chase, but what is left of it is protected as a detached part of the designated "Area of Outstanding Natural Beauty" (AONB) of the modern version of the Forest of Bowland.

The most populated part of the ancient forest are not in the modern AONB. This includes the line of townships along the Barrowford road, from Higham to Barrowford, north of the River Calder and Blacko on the road from Barrowford to Gisburn, on the east of the forest. Parts south of Pendle Water and the River Calder, such as Reedley and Ightenhill, are now suburbs of the modern town of Burnley. To the less populated north and east some Ribble Valley district areas such as Sabden, Twiston and Downham have been added to the forest AONB.

Original forest townships still within the AONB include Newchurch, Barley and Roughlee.
