= Burnley Rural District =

Former local government area in the UK

Coordinates: 53.815896°N 2.234517°W

Burnley was a Rural district of Lancashire, England from 1894 to 1974. It was named after but did not include the large town of Burnley, which was a county borough.

The district and its council was created in 1894 under the Local Government Act 1894. In 1974 it was abolished under the Local Government Act 1972, with its territory going on to form part of the districts of Pendle, Ribble Valley, Burnley and Hyndburn.

The offices of the Rural District Council were in Reedley Hallows, Reedley at what is now the Oaks Hotel on Colne Road. Prior to becoming the Council offices, the building was a private residence known as Oakleigh and the home of Abraham Altham. The Altham family were importers of tea and this is represented in the fine stained glass window found at The Oaks colloquially giving the building the name "Tay-Pot (or teapot) Hall". The Altham's also founded a travel agency business in 1874 which continues to trade throughout East Lancashire, the west of Yorkshire and North Lincolnshire

It administered the area containing the civil parishes of Altham, Barley-with-Wheatley Booth, Blacko, Briercliffe, Brunshaw (merged with Burnley in 1911), Cliviger, Dunnockshaw, Foulridge, Goldshaw Booth, Habergham Eaves, Hapton, Heyhouses (part of Sabden after 1904), Higham with West Close Booth, Huncoat (merged with Accrington in 1929), Ightenhill, Old Laund Booth, Newchurch in Pendle, Northtown (today split between Ightenhill, Higham and Simonstone), Old Laund Booth, Read, Reedley Hallows, Roughlee Booth, Sabden (after 1904), Simonstone, Trawden, Wheatly Carr Booth (merged with Old Laund Booth in 1935), Worsthorne with Hurstwood.
