= List of Inghamite chapels =

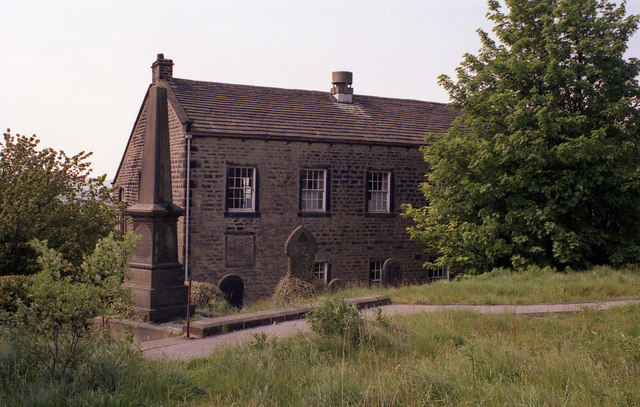
Inghamite Chapel, Winewall, near Colne, Lancashire (closed 1998).

The following is a list of Inghamite chapels, churches and meeting houses built by followers of Benjamin Ingham, an evangelist from Ossett, Yorkshire.

In the middle of the 18th century, Ingham founded a number of Non-conformist Christian societies, chiefly in the Pennine areas of Lancashire and Yorkshire. These 'societies' formed the basis of local congregations which met in chapels as their place of worship. Less commonly some are referred to as churches, or meeting houses. Many of these chapels were funded and built new for this purpose by benefactors in the Inghamite societies. At the height of their popularity around 100 Inghamite Chapels are believed to have existed, including one in Ontario, Canada.

Following the death of their founder, congregations gradually declined: the number of active chapels had reduced to 16 chapels in 1814, seven chapels in 1918, and only two (Wheatley Lane and Salterforth) survived into the 21st century. In 2019, only Wheatley Lane remained open. The church in Ontario survives, but no longer calls itself Inghamite.

The following list is based chiefly on that given in a 1958 book by Robert Walker Thomson, which in turn quotes from an older source. Supporting information is also drawn from P.J.Oates' book. Chapels and meeting houses which had closed before 1813 are not included.

Location (with OS GRID REF)	Opened / Closed	Notes
Lancashire
Colne Field, Colne SD 897 403	1760s / 1840s	Located off Keighley Road to the east of the cemetery. Later becoming a school, now two cottages.
Colne Lane, Colne SD 890 400	1826 / 1908	Was originally a Baptist chapel (1788/1826). After life as an Inghamite chapel it was sold to the Pentecostal Church (1908)
Ludgate Circus, Colne	1908 / 1951	Replaced the chapel at Colne Lane
West Street, Colne	1951 / 1976	Replaced the chapel at Ludgate Circus
Cotton Tree Lane, Colne SD 905 401	1900 / 1993	Formed by a breakaway congregation from Winewall Inghamite Chapel following a disagreement. Building was closed in 1993 and demolished in 1996 to be replaced with new houses.
Haslingden	1803 / before 1851	(Room only in Pleasant Street)
Russell Street, Nelson	1886 / 1957	Building sold to Salvation Army in 1957 becoming the Salvation Army Citadel
Rodhill, nr Grindleton SD 761 479	1754 / 1837	(formerly in West Riding of Yorkshire). Subsequently used by the Methodists 1844 - 1863.
Wheatley Lane, Fence, Burnley SD 838 384	1750 / open	The largest chapel remaining by 1814. Now the only chapel still open. It is a member of the Fellowship of Independent Evangelical Churches
Winewall, near Colne SD 911 398	1752 / 2001	A second chapel was built in 1860, original then becoming a day school. After storm damage the later chapel was demolished in 1979, and the first chapel was part converted back to its original usage. Last service held September 1998. Permanently closed 2001. Now residential flats. Large graveyard still exists at rear.
Nottinghamshire
Bulwell, nr Nottingham	1803 / 1817	Established by members from St Mary's Gate chapel. Unlikely a building ever existed
St Mary's Gate Chapel, Nottingham	1800 / 1844	Built at the lower end of St Mary's Gate on the west side. No trace of church exists today
Westmorland
Birks, Warcop, Eden Valley NY 719 151	1757 / 1837	Located on a hill top 2 miles west of Warcop. Only an Inghamite chapel up to 1813, then becoming Congregational.Now a barn
Bankfield Road, Kendal SD 511 924	1844 / 1971	Known as "Pear Tree" Inghamite Chapel, named after Pear Tree Barn where meetings were held from 1757 until the new chapel was built in 1844. Chapel converted into housing in 1985
Yorkshire (West Riding)
Cowgill, Dentdale	1754 / 1830s	Probably ceased holding meetings late 1770s
New House chapel, Gisburn SD 832 539	1839 / 1850s	
Duke Street, Leeds	1788 / 1853	
Ossett		Chapel building was possibly in Back Lane
Earby Road, Salterforth SD 890 455	1754 / c.2010	New / rebuilt chapel opened in 1932
Stansfield, Halifax	1787 / 1867	Location uncertain either Blind Lane or Ferney Lee Road, just off Burnley Road
Chapel Street, Tadcaster	1814 / ?	Chapel possibly rebuilt 1840
Thinoaks, Clapham SD 707 685	1757 / 1820s	Now used as a barn at Oaklands Farm off the Clapham to Bentham road
Blind Lane, Todmorden	1787 / ?	. Actually at bottom of Ferney Lee Rd. Now private house named Fern House.
Tosside		
Wibsey, nr Bradford	1758 / c1820s	
Yorkshire (East Riding)
Howden, nr Goole	1788 / 1850	Sold to the Wesleyan church in 1850. Demolished late 20th century
Canada
Farringdon, Brantford, Ontario	1839 / open	Founded by members from Pear Tree Chapel, Kendal
