= Listed buildings in Old Laund Booth =

Old Laund Booth is a civil parish in Pendle, Lancashire, England. It contains 17 listed buildings that are recorded in the National Heritage List for England. All of the listed buildings are designated at Grade II, the lowest of the three grades, which is applied to "buildings of national importance and special interest". The parish contains the villages of Fence and Wheatley, and surrounding countryside. Most of the listed buildings are houses and associated structures, farmhouses and farm buildings, the others being two churches, a school, and a public house.

== Buildings ==
Name and location	Photograph	Date	Notes
Old Laund Hall; 53.83261°N 2.24395°W	—	16th century (possible)	A stone house with three storeys. It has a porch with a Tudor arch leading to a Tudor-arched doorway. All the windows are mullioned. Inside the house is an inglenook.
Orchard Cottage; 53.83839°N 2.25130°W	—	17th century	A rendered cottage with a stone-slate roof in two storeys. The windows are mullioned, although the mullions are replacements and some are missing. The doorway dates from the 18 century, and has an architrave and a cornice.
Fencegate Farmhouse; 53.83008°N 2.26681°W	—	Late 17th century	A stone house with a blue slate roof in two storeys. Most of the windows are mullioned, although the mullions are replacements and some are missing, and there is one small irregular window and one sash window. On the front is a modern porch.
Grains Barn Farm; 53.83712°N 2.24744°W	—	17th century	A house with attached barn in sandstone with a stone-slate roof. The windows in the house are mullioned. The barn has three bays and contains aisles. The openings include doorways, two of which are wide, and tiers of blocked ventilation slits.
Hoarstones; 53.83479°N 2.26625°W	—	18th century	A large stone house with quoins and a stone-slate roof. It has two storeys and six bays with a two-storey gabled porch. The doorway has a moulded surround and a panelled round hood. The windows are sashes.
Chapel House Farmhouse; 53.84178°N 2.24613°W	—	Mid to late 18th century	The house is in stone with a stone-slate roof, and has two storeys and two bays. The doorway has fluted Doric pilasters, a triglyph frieze, and a pediment. The windows are sashes, and at the rear is a round-headed stair window.
Church Cottage; 53.82996°N 2.26809°W	—	1771	A stone house with a stone-slate roof in two storeys. There are two four-light mullioned windows in each floor. In the centre is a doorway with a plain surround, above which is a semicircular-headed niche containing a datestone.
304 Wheatley Lane Road; 53.83921°N 2.25110°W		Late 18th century	The house is in stone with three storeys. The doorway has a square head and a rectangular fanlight, and the windows are mullioned with stepped heads.
Bay Horse; 53.82980°N 2.26844°W		Late 18th century	Originally a row of six cottages, later converted into a public house. It is in stone, partly rendered, with a stone-slate roof. The building has two storeys, with mullioned windows, some of which contain sashes. The doorway has a plain surround.
Height Farmhouse; 53.83809°N 2.26777°W	—	Late 18th or early 19th century	A stone house with a stone-slate roof, in two storeys and with a symmetrical three-bay front. There is a semicircular-headed doorway with a fanlight, above which is an arched window with Gothick tracery. The other windows are sashes.
Fencegate House; 53.83061°N 2.26706°W		Early 19th century	Originally a house in late Georgian style, later converted into a public house. It is in stone with quoins and a stone-slate roof, and has three storeys and a symmetrical three-bay front. The doorway has a Tuscan doorcase, a pediment and a fanlight, and above it is a round-headed window. The windows are sashes with mullions.
St Anne's Church; 53.83040°N 2.26800°W		1836–37	The church is in stone with a stone-slate roof, and consists of a nave, a chancel, a south porch, a vestry, and a west tower. The tower has three stages, with buttresses and an embattled parapet. The windows on the sides of the church are long thin lancets. Inside the church is a west gallery.
1, 3 and 5 Fencegate; 53.83013°N 2.26667°W	—	19th century	A row of three stone cottages with a blue slate roof, in two storeys. Most of the windows are casements from which the mullions have been removed. The doorways have plain surrounds.
Methodist School; 53.83459°N 2.25876°W		1859	The original part of the school is in a single storey with six bays, and a two-storey block has been added to the right. The first bay contains a doorway with a round arch and a keystone. The fourth bay projects forward and has a gable with a datestone. The windows have round-arched heads with keystones.
Wheatley Lane Methodist Church; 53.83471°N 2.25851°W		1867	The church is in stone with a slate roof, and has a symmetrical entrance front of four bays. In the ground floor are two square-headed windows flanked by doorways with elliptical heads, pediments, and Tuscan columns. The upper floor contains round-headed windows with keystones, and at the top is a pedimented gable containing a circular datestone.
Cottage adjoining Methodist Church; 53.83465°N 2.25862°W	—	c. 1867	The cottage is in stone with a stone-slate roof. In the ground floor is a doorway and a sash window, and there are two similar windows in the upper floor.
Gateposts, Hoarstones; 53.83483°N 2.26595°W	—	Undated	The gate posts are in stone. They are rusticated and have cornices and ball finials.
