= Listed buildings in Higham with West Close Booth =

Higham with West Close Booth is a civil parish in Pendle, Lancashire, England. It contains 16 listed buildings that are recorded in the National Heritage List for England. Of these, one is at Grade II*, the middle grade, and the others are at Grade II, the lowest grade. The parish contains the village of Higham and surrounding countryside. Most of the listed buildings are houses, farmhouses and farm buildings. The other listed buildings consist of a public house, a church, a former school, and a war memorial.

== Key ==
Grade	Criteria
II*	Particularly important buildings of more than special interest
II	Buildings of national importance and special interest

== Buildings ==
Name and location	Photograph	Date	Notes	Grade
Ashlar House and Cottage; 53.82889°N 2.27223°W		1594	A stone building with a stone-slate roof, in two storeys and three bays, with finials on the gables. There is a two-storey porch with two moulded inscribed tablets and a doorway with a four-centred arch. The windows are mullioned and transomed.	II*
Higham Hall; 53.82460°N 2.29081°W		17th century	The house is in stone, with quoins and a stone-slate roof, and has two storeys. The doorway has a Tudor arched head, and the windows are mullioned. There is a lean-to extension to the left.	II
Higham House; 53.82454°N 2.29119°W	—	Mid 17th century (probable)	The house is in gritstone and has a stone-flag roof. There are two storeys, and an entrance front of three bays with a central porch. On the right return is an outshut and a lean-to porch in the angle. Most of the windows are casements.	II
Lower House Farmhouse; 53.82480°N 2.29168°W		17th century (probable)	A stone house with quoins and a stone-slate roof. Most of the windows are original and mullioned. There is one Victorian window, and a modern gabled porch.	II
Old House, Lower White Lee; 53.82782°N 2.27745°W	—	17th century	Originally a house, later used for agricultural purposes, the building is stone with a slate roof. It has two low storeys, and two two-light mullioned windows in each floor. The doorway has a plain surround.	II
Hollins Farmhouse; 53.81336°N 2.29053°W		Mid to late 17th century	The farmhouse was extended in the 19th century. It is in sandstone with a roof partly of Welsh slate and partly of stone-slate. It has two storeys with attics, and a three-bay front, the third bay being set back. The windows are mullioned, and there is a single-storey gabled porch.	II
Copthurst Farmhouse and Cottage; 53.82511°N 2.30664°W		Late 17th century (probable)	The building is in sandstone with quoins and a stone-slate roof. There are two storeys and a three-bay front. The doorways have plain surrounds, and the windows are mullioned. In the central bay at the rear is a stair turret.	II
1, 3, 5, and 7 Jackson Fold; 53.82496°N 2.29209°W		18th century	A row of four houses, with Nos 1 and 3 projecting forward. They are in stuccoed stone with stone-slate roofs, and have two storeys. Most of the windows are mullioned, and No 3 has a shop window in the ground floor, a stepped window above, and an inscribed tablet between.	II
Lower White Lee; 53.82796°N 2.27711°W		Mid 18th century	The house is in stone with a stone-slate roof, and has three storeys and three bays. The windows are mullioned. On the front is a central doorway with a triangular pediment, above which is a round-headed staircase window. At the rear is a central round-headed window with an oculus above.	II
Higher White Lee Farmhouse; 53.82877°N 2.28483°W	—	1771	A stone house with a stone-slate roof in two storeys. It has a doorway with a semicircular arched head, and a fanlight, and two sash windows on each floor. There is a later extension to the right. In the west gable is a datestone, and there is an older, re-set datestone on the rear.	II
Four Alls Inn; 53.82471°N 2.29220°W		1790	A public house in stone with quoins and a slate roof. It has two storeys and three bays. The central doorway has a moulded architrave, a frieze, and a pediment containing a datestone. The windows are modern with plain surrounds.	II
Acre House; 53.82799°N 2.27844°W	—	Mid 19th century	A stone house with quoins and a hipped slate roof. It has two storeys and a symmetrical front of three bays. In the centre is a porch with a pediment and a segmental-headed doorway. The windows are sashes. At the rear is a later two-bay extension.	II
Cottage adjoining Acre House; 53.82798°N 2.27856°W	—	Mid 19th century	The cottage is to the right of the house, and set back with a lower roof. It is rendered with a stone-slate roof. The windows are sashes.	II
School; 53.82515°N 2.29010°W		1851	Originally a chapel of ease, the school is in stone with a stone-slate roof, and has one storey and six bays. In the centre is a porch with an arched doorway, above which is a circular bell turret with six slim pillars and a ball finial. The windows have two lights with arched heads separated by mullions. The building ceased being a school in the 1990s and is now the village hall and run by the parish council.	II
St John the Evangelist's Church; 53.82531°N 2.28966°W		1874	The church, designed by William Waddington, is in Early English style, and is built in gritstone with a Welsh slate roof. It consists of a nave with a south porch and an organ chamber, a chancel with a north vestry, and a southwest steeple. The steeple has a single-stage turret and a spire that is square with chamfered corners and contains gabled bell openings. In the three-light east window is Decorated tracery.	II
War memorial 53.82521°N 2.28968°W		1921	The war memorial is in the churchyard of St John the Evangelist's Church. It is in Bolton Abbey stone, and consists of a cross fleurée with a tapering shaft on a base of three steps. Carved on the south face is a foliate design. On the steps are inscriptions and the names of those lost in the First World War, and on the lower part of the shaft are the names of those lost in the Second World War.	II
