= Pendle Community Radio =

Nelson; England
- Broadcast area: Pendle, Lancashire
- Frequency: 103.1 MHz

Programming
- Format: Community, contemporary, special interest

Ownership
- Owner: Independent

History
- First air date: 28 August 2007

Links
- Website: PCR - Pendle Community Radio

Pendle Community Radio is a community radio station based in Nelson, Lancashire. Starting broadcasts on 103.1 MHz FM in September 2007, it aims to provide dedicated programming to the Asian Muslim population that live in Pendle, east Lancashire, during times of Muslim holy festivals. As common with many of the UK's new community radio stations, it will also have a wider remit to promote wider "social gain", for all local communities, through on-air access via voluntary opportunities. The station also aims to help with community cohesion and integration, economic regeneration and development and political wellbeing.

== History ==
Pendle Community Radio stems from several short term Restricted Service Licence broadcasts, dating back to 1999, that were awarded by Ofcom and its predecessor, The Radio Authority.

These RSL broadcasts usually ran twice a year, each for 28 days, to coincide with Eid ul-Fitr (Ramadhan) and Milad un Nabi. Hence the name of the radio station changed between Radio Ramadhan or Milaad FM, to coincide.

Following the success of the RSL broadcasts and the fact that there wasn't another local radio station with any significant special interest programmes aimed at the local community, Ofcom awarded a full-time 5 year community radio licence in 2006 to the same group that ran the RSLs. The radio station is based at 15 Cross Street Nelson and named as AWAZ RADIO 103.1 FM (Pendle Community Radio).

The team is led by professionals. Current Directors Sagheer Akhtar and Shahid Kaleem have clearly outlined the aims and objectives for the coming years. The team includes technical professionals and volunteers. Great team includes Adnan Sohail, Tasawer Ali, Ismail, sisters, brothers, presenters and guests.

Pendle Community Radio has a weekly programme on behalf of the Burnley Pendle and Rossendale Council for Voluntary Service which gives representatives of local voluntary, faith and community sector organisations the chance of much-needed publicity.

== Funding ==
Ofcom stipulates that any community radio station that is situated within the area of a commercial radio station (with a served population of between 50,000 and 150,000), must obtain at least 50% of revenues from donations and grants. A maximum of 50% can be derived from the sale of advertising and sponsorship. Any community radio station must also be run as not-for-profit. As such many community radio stations focus on using volunteers in many operational areas

Pendle Community Radio aims to find suitable grant funding from both the public and private sector. Some of this will be from the Ofcom "Community Radio Fund", provided by the Department for Culture, Media and Sport as well as other grants. It is envisaged that this will be used to further fund technology and studio equipment and facilitate the future progression of the station, ultimately leading to some paid positions.
