= Thomas Whitham =

Recipient of the Victoria Cross (1888–1924)

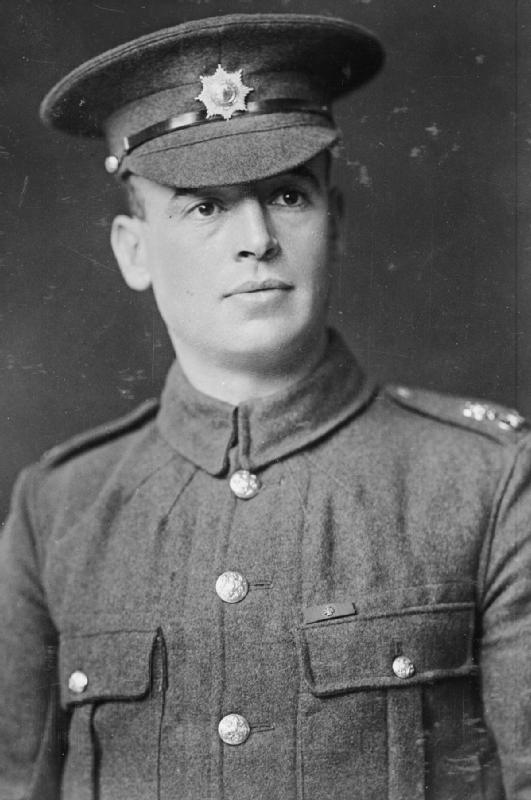
- Born: 11 May 1888; Worsthorne (near Burnley), Lancashire
- Died: 22 October 1924 (aged 36); Oldham Infirmary, Lancashire
- Burial place: Inghamite Burial Ground, Wheatley Lane
- Relatives: Jack Whitham (grandson)
- Military career
- Allegiance: United Kingdom
- Branch: British Army
- Service years: 1915-1919
- Rank: Private
- Units: 1st Battalion, Coldstream Guards
- Conflicts: World War I - Battle of Passchendaele
- Awards: Victoria Cross
- Other work: Bricklayer

Thomas Whitham VC (11 May 1888 – 22 October 1924) was an English recipient of the Victoria Cross, the highest and most prestigious award for gallantry in the face of the enemy that can be awarded to British and Commonwealth forces.

== War service ==
On 25 January 1915, Whitham enlisted in the British Army. He was 29 years old, and a private in the 1st Battalion, Coldstream Guards, during the First World War when the following deed took place for which he was awarded the VC.

On 31 July 1917, during an engagement at Pilckem near Ypres, Belgium, Private Whitham observed an enemy machine gun firing upon the adjacent battalion. Whitham advanced through the friendly artillery barrage and heavy enemy fire to reach the position. He captured the machine gun and three prisoners, including one officer. This action neutralized a threat to the battalion's flank and prevented further casualties.

== Post war ==
After the war he became a bricklayer but he struggled to find work. He was forced to sell his VC and a gold watch that had been presented to him by Burnley council in recognition of his bravery. Both ended up in a pawn shop but were rescued by the council and remain on display in the Towneley Hall Art Gallery & Museums in Burnley. Thomas died in poverty aged 36. He was buried on 27 October 1924 at Wheatley Lane Inghamite Church. In 1952 a grave memorial was erected for him by the Coldstream Guards association.

In 2008, it was announced that Burnley Schools' Sixth Form would be renamed Thomas Whitham Sixth Form.

A grandson was professional footballer Jack Whitham.

== Additional awards ==
- The 1914-15 Star
- The British War Medal
- The WWI Victory Medal
