= Edmund Robinson =

English boy who sparked a witch-hunt

Edmund Robinson was an English ten-year-old boy from Wheatley Lane, Lancashire, who sparked a witch-hunt.

His story was the inspiration for the 1634 play The Late Lancashire Witches.
