= Thomas Whitham Sixth Form =

Coordinates: 53.8056°N 2.2403°W

Location
- Barden Lane; Burnley, Lancashire, BB10 1JB; England

Information
- Type: Sixth Form Centre
- Established: 2006
- Closed: 31 August 2020
- Local authority: Lancashire County Council
- Department for Education URN: 135000 Tables
- Ofsted: Reports
- Chair of Governors: T Litherland
- Head teacher: D Swyft
- Gender: mixed
- Age: 16 to 18
- Enrolment: 84
- Website: http://www.twsf.lancs.sch.uk/

Thomas Whitham Sixth Form was a mixed 16 to 18 sixth form centre in Burnley, Lancashire.

== History ==
The sixth form opened in September 2006, as part of the first wave of a nationwide 10 to 15-year programme of capital investment funded by the Department for Education and Skills called Building Schools for the Future..

For the first two years of its existence, under the temporary name of Burnley Schools' Sixth Form, it occupied the site of the former Barden High School, before moving into new premises in September 2008, on an adjacent site. It is named after Thomas Whitham VC who served during World War I. It was judged "good with outstanding features" in an inspection by Ofsted in 2011.

Due to decreasing number of students, and a worsening financial position, the sixth form was closed in 2020.
