= Goldshaw Booth =

Civil parish in Lancashire, England

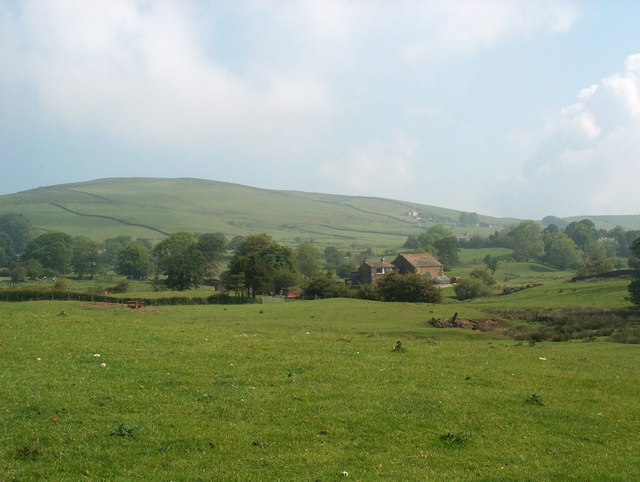
- Countryside near Sabden Fold

- Location in Pendle Borough Location in the Forest of Bowland AONB Location within Lancashire
- Population: 248 (2011)
- OS grid reference: SD8239
- Civil parish: Goldshaw Booth
- District: Pendle
- Shire county: Lancashire
- Region: North West
- Country: England
- Sovereign state: United Kingdom
- Post town: BURNLEY
- Postcode district: BB12
- Dialling code: 01282
- Police: Lancashire
- Fire: Lancashire
- Ambulance: North West
- UK Parliament: Pendle

Goldshaw Booth is a civil parish in the Pendle district of Lancashire, England. It has a population of 248, and contains the village of Newchurch in Pendle and the hamlets of Spen Brook (53.846°N 2.267°W) and Sabden Fold (53.841°N 2.290°W). Pendle Hill lies to the north.

The parish adjoins the Pendle parishes of Barley-with-Wheatley Booth, Roughlee Booth, Old Laund Booth and Higham-with-West Close Booth and the Ribble Valley parish of Sabden. It is part of the Forest of Bowland Area of Outstanding Natural Beauty (AONB).

According to the United Kingdom Census 2011, the parish has a population of 248, a decrease from 265 in the 2001 census.

Goldshaw Booth was once a township in the ancient parish of Whalley. This became a civil parish in 1866, forming part of the Burnley Rural District from 1894. The township extended to cover parts of the adjoining villages of Fence and Wheatley Lane, but this part transferred to Old Laund Booth in 1898. Parts of the parish also transferred to Sabden on its creation in 1904, (Note: In 1848, areas around Ratten Clough farm and the Deerstones were still included with Goldshaw Booth.) and Newchurch in Pendle also used to straddle the boundary with Roughlee Booth but was brought entirely within the parish in 1935.

Along with Higham-with-West Close Booth, Barley-with-Wheatley Booth and Roughlee Booth, the parish forms the Higham with Pendleside ward of Pendle Borough Council.

== Media gallery ==
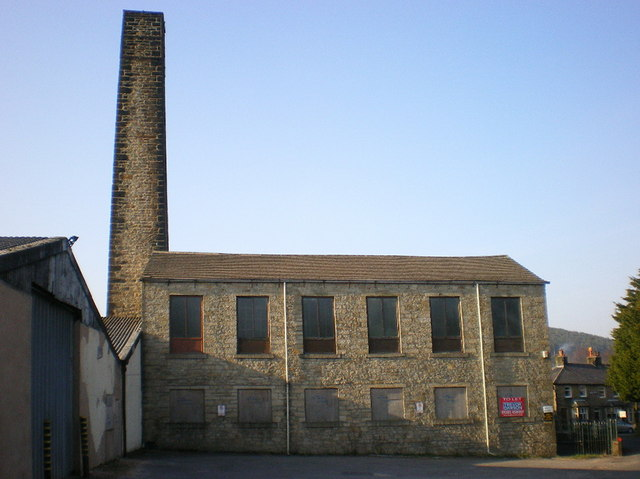
Spenbrook Mill

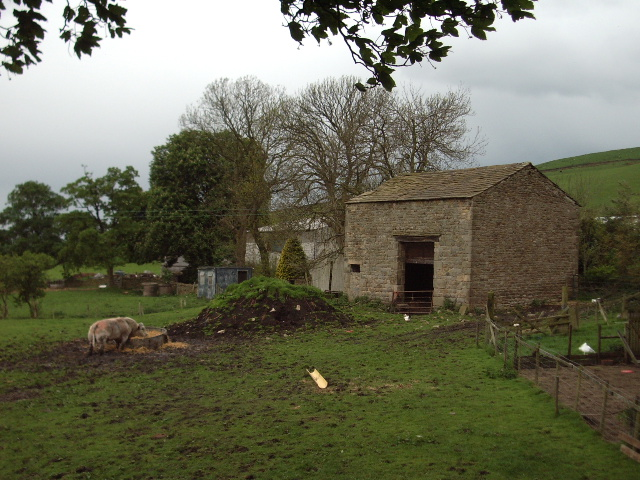
Old barn at Sabden Fold

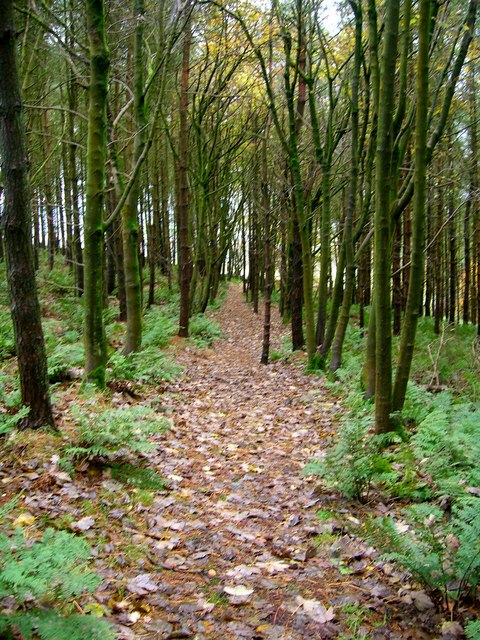
Footpath through a plantation east of Newchurch

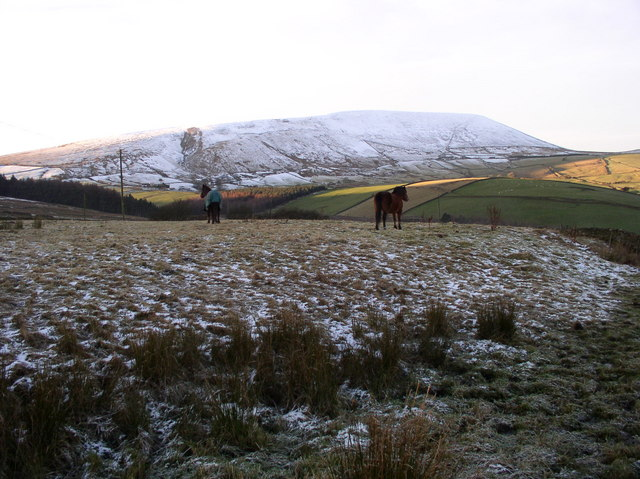
Pendle from Cross Lane in winter

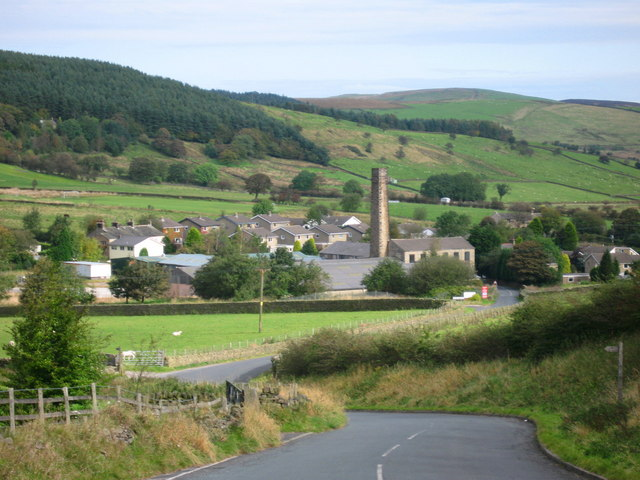
Spen Brook from the south-east

== See also ==
- Listed buildings in Goldshaw Booth
