= Listed buildings in Sabden =

Sabden is a civil parish in Ribble Valley, Lancashire, England. It contains four listed buildings that are recorded in the National Heritage List for England. All of the listed buildings are designated at Grade II, the lowest of the three grades, which is applied to "buildings of national importance and special interest". The parish contains the village of Sabden and surrounding countryside. The listed buildings consist of two houses, a farmhouse, and a church.

== Buildings ==
Name and location	Photograph	Date	Notes
Dean Farmhouse; 53.83261°N 2.30810°W		1574	The house was extended in the 19th century when a parallel range was added to the east. It is in sandstone with a modern tile roof, there are two storeys with attics, and two gables on the south front. The windows are mullioned. In the west wall is a window with 14 lights that also has a transom, and on this face is a worn inscription. The doorway in the east range has a plain surround.
Whins House; 53.83287°N 2.34773°W		c. 1808	A sandstone house with quoins and a stone-slate roof, in two storeys. On the front is a two-storey bow window, with one bay to the right and two to the left. The windows are sashes, there is a Tuscan doorcase, and the door has a round head and a fanlight.
St Nicholas' Church; 53.83464°N 2.33361°W		1838–41	Designed by R. P. Rampling, the church is in sandstone with a slate roof. It is in Norman style, and the doorways and windows have round heads. The church consists of a nave, a lower chancel with a lean-to north vestry, and a west steeple. The steeple has a west window, clock faces in gablets on three sides, an octagonal bell stage, and a spire. Inside the church is a west gallery.
Sabden House; 53.83519°N 2.33284°W		1847	Originally a vicarage, later in private use, it is in sandstone with a hipped slate roof. There are two storeys, and the house has an L-shaped plan, with a main block and a service wing to the north. The entrance front has three bays and a single-storey porch. The windows are mullioned and contain sashes. The doorway has a moulded semicircular head and a hood mould. In the south front are two canted bay windows, and at the rear is a 20th-century conservatory.
