= Higham, Lancashire =

Village in Lancashire, England

Coordinates: 53.824°N 2.295°W

Higham
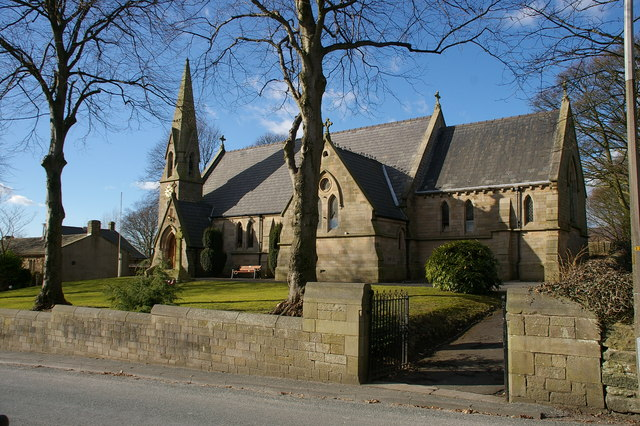
- Saint John the Evangelist Church

- Location in Pendle Borough Location within Lancashire
- Population: 778
- OS grid reference: SD805365
- Civil parish: Higham with West Close Booth
- District: Pendle
- Shire county: Lancashire
- Region: North West
- Country: England
- Sovereign state: United Kingdom
- Post town: BURNLEY
- Postcode district: BB12
- Dialling code: 01282
- Police: Lancashire
- Fire: Lancashire
- Ambulance: North West
- UK Parliament: Pendle and Clitheroe

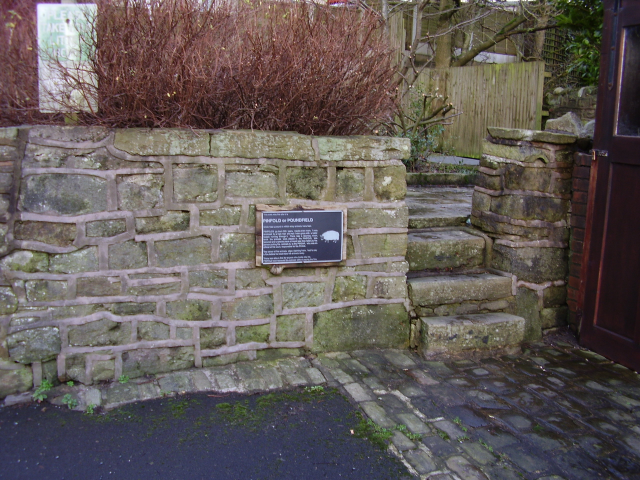
The Pinfold near the centre of Higham

Higham is a village in the Borough of Pendle in Lancashire, England, south of Pendle Hill. The civil parish is named Higham with West Close Booth. The village is 2 miles (3 km) north-east of Padiham and about 4 miles (6 km) south-west of Nelson along the A6068 road.

According to the United Kingdom Census 2011, the parish has a population of 778, a decrease from 808 in the 2001 census.

The parish adjoins the other Pendle parishes of Goldshaw Booth, Old Laund Booth and Reedley Hallows, the Burnley parishes of Ightenhill and Padiham, and the Ribble Valley parishes of Simonstone and Sabden. The area of the parish north of Stump Hall Road is part of the Forest of Bowland Area of Outstanding Natural Beauty (AONB).

== Governance ==
Higham with West Close Booth was once a township in the ancient parish of Whalley. This became a civil parish in 1866, forming part of the Burnley Rural District from 1894. The township included a detached area south of the village of Fence, but this part transferred to Old Laund Booth in 1898. A part of the parish also transferred to Sabden on its creation in 1904. (Note: In 1848, the northwest corner of the township extended around Dean farm.) The neighbouring civil parish of North Town (historically associated with Padiham) was merged into Simonstone in 1983. However, after a public campaign to move Simonstone into the Borough of Ribble Valley and Boundary Commission review completed in 1985, a part of North Town lying north of the A6068 Padiham Bypass was added to this parish.

Along with Goldshaw Booth, Barley-with-Wheatley Booth and Roughlee Booth, the parish forms the Higham with Pendleside ward of Pendle Borough Council.

== Facilities ==
The centre of Higham is a conservation area. The buildings in the area are stone-built, mainly from the 19th century with a few even older. Several farmhouses and barns have been converted to houses. Outside the Conservation Area most buildings are from later periods, including modern housing estates.

Amenities include a pub, the Four Alls Inn, est. 1798 where one can discover the meaning of "Four Alls"; the Church of St. John the Evangelist (C of E) built 1874, Higham C of E (Controlled) Primary School, and the Village Hall.

== Buildings and features ==
The Spout is a feature in the centre of the village, providing constant natural spring water. Nearby is the historic site of a pinfold or poundfield, a walled area with grass and running water which was used to temporarily impound animals.

Other buildings of note include the village hall, 1837, which was built as the National School and also used for Church of England services until St. John's Church was built. Higham Hall, 17th century, had been used for meetings of the court of the Forest of Pendle. Clover Croft Mill stood in the centre of the village, having latterly been used as a furniture factory. The demolition was completed in 2006 to enable a housing development to be built on the site.

On the road to Nelson are three buildings of interest: Lower White Lee (18th century), Higher White Lee birthplace of Jonas Moore (see below), Ashlar House has a porch dated 1594 with the names Richard Grimshaw and John Box, but the house seems to have been rebuilt in the 17th century.

== Notable residents ==
- Jonas Moore (1617–1679) later Sir Jonas Moore FRS, was an English mathematician, surveyor, Ordnance officer and patron of astronomy, born at White Lee, now Higher White Lee Farm, Higham.
- Harry Hargreaves (1896–1975) professional footballer, played 110 games, born in Higham.
- Herbert Butterworth (1902–1938) professional footballer, played 9 games for Nelson F.C., born in Higham.

=== and ===
- The Pendle Witches. One of the families swept up in the Pendle Witch Trials of 1612 was the 'Chattox' clan, based in West Close where the old crone Mother Chattox lived and her family pursued their work of professional begging. In Alizon Device's confession she told that "Anne Whittle, alias Chattox, was suspected for bewitching the drinke of John Moore of Higham, gentleman" and for causing one of his sons to die. The landlord of the pub, The Four Alls, accused Chattox of putting a curse on his brew. The suspected witches were first examined at Ashlar House, by local Magistrate Roger Nowell of nearby Read Hall.

== See also ==
- Listed buildings in Higham with West Close Booth
