= Wheatley Lane, Lancashire =

Village in Lancashire, England

Coordinates: 53.839°N 2.251°W

Wheatley Lane
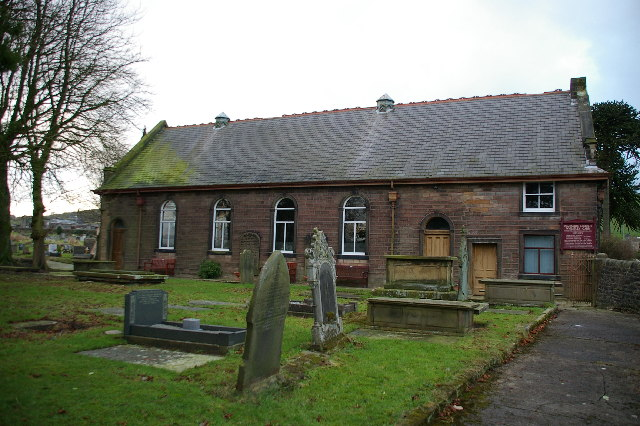
- Wheatley Lane Inghamite Church

- Location in Pendle Borough Location within Lancashire
- OS grid reference: SD835381
- Civil parish: Old Laund Booth
- District: Pendle
- Shire county: Lancashire
- Region: North West
- Country: England
- Sovereign state: United Kingdom
- Post town: BURNLEY
- Postcode district: BB12
- Dialling code: 01282
- Police: Lancashire
- Fire: Lancashire
- Ambulance: North West
- UK Parliament: Pendle and Clitheroe

Wheatley Lane is a village in Pendle, Lancashire, England. It is close to Nelson, Barrowford and Burnley. It lies to the north of the A6068 road, known locally as the Padiham bypass, or "The New Road".

Wheatley Lane is an extended village consisting of a ribbon development along 'Wheatley Lane Road' and abuts the sister village of Fence. The present village has now effectively absorbed the original hamlets of Wheatley Lane and Higher & Lower Harpers.

Historically, it lies in Old Laund Booth, in the Hundred of Blackburn. Up until Late Mediaeval times it lay in the Forest of Pendle, the hunting preserve of the King.

The older properties on the village consist largely of small stone-built cottages, with some later Victorian terraces and some 1950s council properties. Since the 1960s the remaining open fields on either side of the road have been developed for housing. There is unbroken countryside with walking country to the North to Pendle Hill and surrounding areas.

There is a Methodist Chapel and attached primary school in the village, and to the east, on the edge of the village, one of the few remaining Inghamite Chapels, which has an extensive graveyard. It is the burial place of Thomas Whitham who won the Victoria Cross in 1917.

Local tradition has it that the Harpers Inn, a local hostelry, was also originally built as a Methodist Chapel, but when the money ran out, it was sold and completed as a pub. The original name was the 'Who'd have thought it'.

Sports are catered for by Pendle Forest Sports Club.

Wheatley Lane has links with the Pendle Witches. In 1633, Edmund Robinson of Wheatley Lane reported that he had been taken by a witch to a barn at Hoarstones where he had seen 40 witches engaged in various devilish activities. He subsequently identified 19 witches and they were sent to trial in 1634, including Jenet Davies, a witness at the 1612 trial, and the daughter-in-law of Alice Nutter (one of the previous Pendle Witches). However, the judge deferred sentence and sent seven of them to London for further examination; only three survived the ordeal. After an enquiry all 19 were acquitted and Robinson later admitted that the story was a fabrication.

== See also ==
- Listed buildings in Old Laund Booth
