= Ightenhill =

Parish in Burnley, England

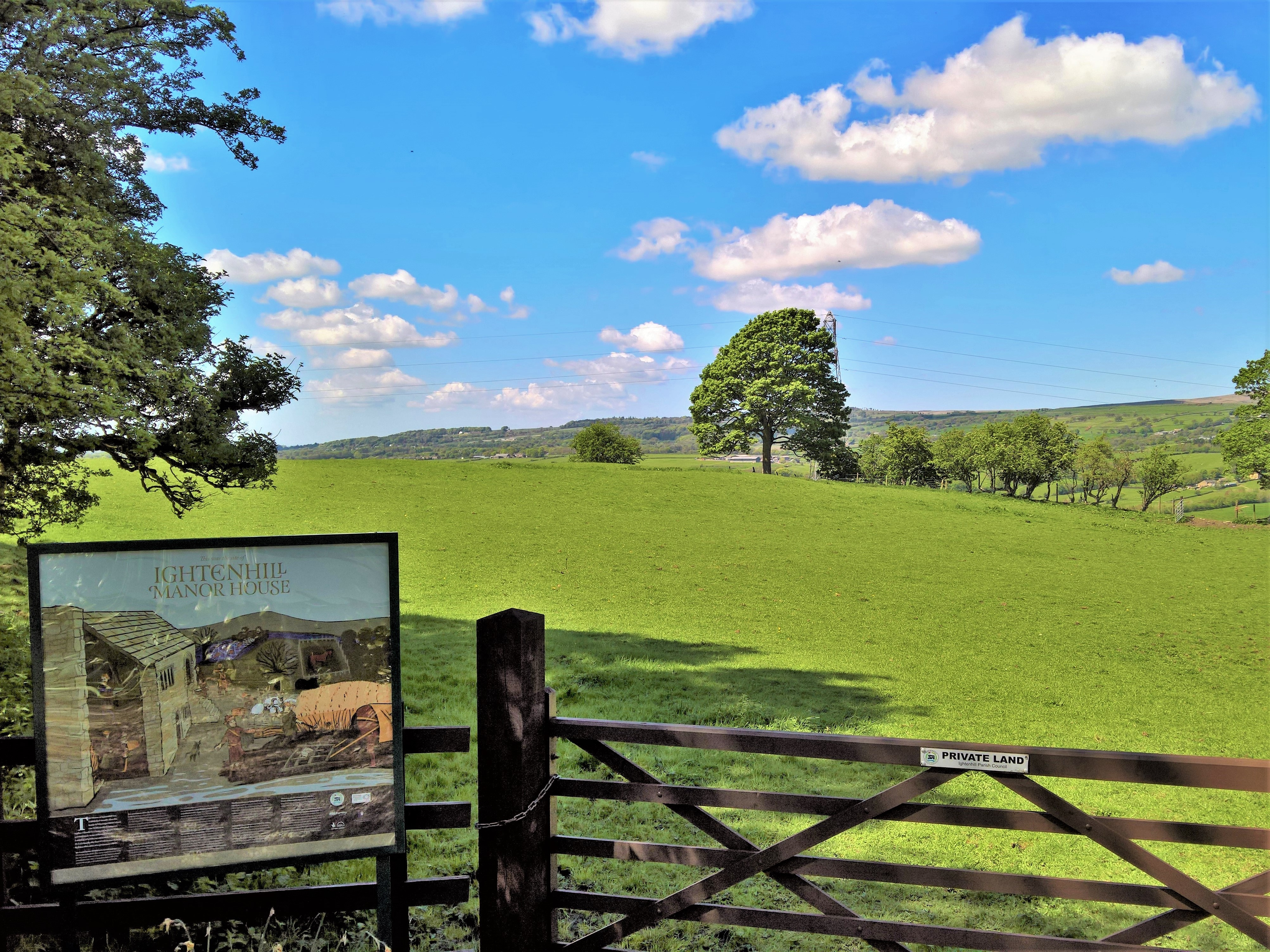
- The site of Ightenhill Manor House

- Shown within Burnley Borough Location within Lancashire
- Area: 1.71 sq mi (4.4 km^{2})
- Population: 1,975 (2011)
  - Density: 1,155/sq mi (446/km^{2})
- OS grid reference: SD8208
- Civil parish: Ightenhill
- District: Burnley
- Shire county: Lancashire
- Region: North West
- Country: England
- Sovereign state: United Kingdom
- Post town: BURNLEY
- Postcode district: BB12
- Dialling code: 01282
- Police: Lancashire
- Fire: Lancashire
- Ambulance: North West
- UK Parliament: Burnley

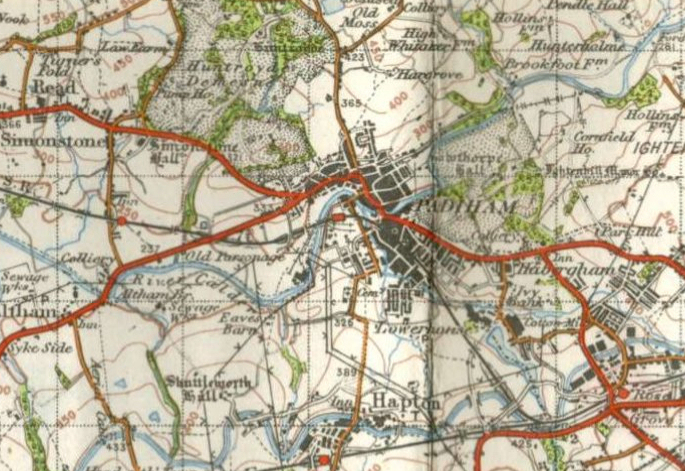
1948 Ordnance Survey map showing the location of Ightenhill Manor (on the eastern part of the map)

Ightenhill is a civil parish in the Borough of Burnley in Lancashire, England, with a population of 1,975.

Since its creation as Ightenhill Park in 1866 the parish has seen a number of boundary changes. The modern civil parish includes Gawthorpe Hall and extends across the River Calder leaving the hill it is named after. As a result, adjoining parts of Burnley, although not inside the parish, are still locally considered part of the Ightenhill area. Much of the populated part of the parish is composed principally of large 1980s housing estates forming part of Burnley's urban area.

The parish adjoins the unparished area of Burnley and the parish of Padiham along with the Pendle parishes of Higham with West Close Booth, and Reedley Hallows. It is in the Whittlefield with Ightenhill ward of Burnley borough.

== History ==
The name is historically recorded as Hightenhull (1238), Ightenhill (1242), Hucnhull (1258) and Ichtenhill (1296 and 1305).

Ightenhill was one of the demesne manors of the Honour of Clitheroe, an estate administered from Clitheroe Castle. The honour passed from the de Lacy family to the Earls, then Dukes of Lancaster, becoming part of the Duchy of Lancaster until 1661. The manor covered a much larger area than the parish, including Heyhouses (now part of Sabden), Padiham, Habergham Eaves, Burnley, Briercliffe (without Extwistle) and Little Marsden (Nelson south of Walverden Water and Brierfield). After 1661 the area of Pendle Forest was also included with it. The site of Ightenhill Manor House (53.8025°N 2.2766°W) is about a quarter of a mile to the east of Gawthorpe Hall on the brow of the hill, the site providing a good view of the whole of Pendle Forest. Manorial courts were presumably originally held here before moving to Higham for Pendle Forest and Burnley for the rest of the manor.

The earliest surviving reference of the name occurs in a charter signed here by John de Lacy, 2nd Earl of Lincoln in 1238, and it appears again in the grant of free warren obtained by his son Edmund in 1251. Edmund also signed at least one charter here the same year. The accounts of Henry de Lacy in 1296 show that a horse stud was already established here, in connection with three enclosures inside the forest, namely Higham and West Closes (in Higham with West Close Booth) and Filly Close in Reedley Hallows. During the rebellion led by Thomas, 2nd Earl of Lancaster, raiders loyal to the king, took most of stock at Ightenhill and in the forests away to Skipton, as a result King Edward II stayed here for several days in October 1323. The 19th-century historian T D Whitaker theorised that the site provided a preferred stop-over as the de Lacys travelled over the Pennines between Pontefract Castle and Clitheroe, and later as the Plantagenets continued on to Lancaster. In 1327 the honour was among the lands granted to Queen Isabella, the mother of Edward III, however the park itself was retained by the king. Continuing as a royal stud, records from 1343-44 show four horses were acquired by the first Duke of Cornwall, Edward the Black Prince.

Parts of the park, at least, must have been enclosed under the de Lacys, (Note: Records from 1296 list fees paid for repairing the pales and diverting the Calder near Whitacre (Whittaker), to protect of the pales of the park) but in 1380, under John of Gaunt, the keeper of Pendle Chase was ordered to surround the entire park with a ditch and quickwood hedge. The first Ordnance Survey map of the area, published in 1840s, shows the park to cover an area of 759 acres (307 ha) on the summit and northern side of the hill. (Note: In the 1840s the park was contained within the area between Padiham Road, Cornfield Grove, Clifton Road and the river. Although only a small part of Clifton Road still exists, its destination Clifton Farm survives, more recently known as the Malt Shovel public house.)

From the early 1400s, the right to farm inside the park was leased to tenants. The last park-keeper to be appointed was Robert Rishton in 1502, and after 1507 the entire park was leased, with Rishton the first occupant, before passing it to the Towneleys by 1519. The manor house was a ruin by 1522, however a survey taken at the time gives detail on the buildings at the site, listing the hall with a great chamber and long chamber at its western end, also the kitchen, pantry, oven-house, great barn, chapel, stable and houses for the park-keeper and butler. In 1894 no part of the walls was still standing, but the foundations of the keep could still easily be traced. Stone from the site is thought have used in the construction of the neighbouring farmhouse.

By 1593, the Shuttleworths of Gawthorpe had taken control of the park, probably a result of the recusancy of John Towneley. With the exception of the site of the manor house, the family later acquired the freehold title, and continued to own it into the 20th century.

Outside the park (and parish) a hamlet anciently known as Ightenhill lay to the south near to Whittlefield and Gannow. Also, in the part of the parish across the Calder, Whittaker must have been a settlement comparable to Padiham during the Late Middle Ages, as that township was called Padiham cum Whitacre in 1296. It was the residence of the Whittaker family from as early as 1311, until around the start of the 17th century, when it also was acquired by the Shuttleworths.

Quarrying stone for construction occurred at various sites including the area near the Tim Bobbin Public House and areas near Gawthorpe, into the 20th century.

== Geography ==
The summit of Ighten Hill is approximately 146 metres above sea level. It is bounded to the north and east by the River Calder, and on the west by Green Brook and its tributary Sweet Clough. A ridge to the south has today been cut through by the M65 motorway and East Lancashire line railway, with the Leeds and Liverpool Canal running a in tunnel under it. As well as the civil parish, the hill extends under Burnley's Habergham, Whittlefield, with parts of Gannow and Lowerhouse districts, and part of the town of Padiham.

In the early 19th century the Calder had become extensively polluted by manufacturing waste and the Shuttleworths had its route diverted away from Gawthorpe to the other side of the valley.

Gawthorpe is one of the trailheads of the Brontë Way, a 43-mile (69 km) long-distance footpath that crosses the South Pennines to Haworth, continuing to Oakwell Hall, Birstall, West Yorkshire. The Burnley Way also passes through the parish, with both crossing the bridge over the Calder on the bridleway to Higham.

== Governance ==
Ightenhill Park was an extra-parochial area surrounded by the ancient parish of Whalley. In 1866 the area became a civil parish. The present parish was created in 1894, mainly from the former, but with the small part of Habergham Eaves lying north of A671 Padiham Road, added to it. Before 1931 parts the south-west of the parish transferred into Burnley, aligning the boundaries of the parish with the County borough, however this change also brought the site of Gawthorpe Hall within the parish. Since 1974 it has been part of the Borough of Burnley.

The neighbouring civil parish of North Town (historically associated with Padiham) was merged into Simonstone in 1983. However, after a public campaign to move that parish into the Borough of Ribble Valley and Boundary Commission review completed in 1985, the part of North Town south of the A6068 Padiham Bypass (across the River Calder) and areas between Gawthorpe Hall and Padiham were added to Ightenhill. 2004 saw the parish regain some of the territory previously transferred to Burnley and added the area around All Saints Church and Park Hill School.

Together with part of the unparished area of Burnley, the parish forms the Whittlefield with Ightenhill ward of Burnley Borough Council. The ward elects three councillors, currently Lee Ashworth, Mike Steel, and Don Whitaker (all Conservative). The parish is represented on Lancashire County Council as part of the Burnley Central West division, represented since a by-election in 2023, by Scott Cunliffe (Green Party).

The Member of Parliament for Burnley, the constituency into which the parish falls, is Oliver Ryan of the Labour Party, who was first elected in 2024.

== Demography ==
Population of Ightenhill parish over time
Year	1871	1881	1891	1901	1911	1921	1931	1951	1961	2001	2011
Population	149	205	519	113	132	152	159	158	157	1,512	1,975

According to the United Kingdom Census 2011, the parish has a population of 1,975, an increase from 1,512 in the 2001 census. According to the 2001 Census the ward had 97.13% white ethnic group. The index of multiple deprivation indicates that most of the ward is more affluent than the national average: only 4.34% of children in the ward are eligible for free school meals. There were 52.7 crimes per 1,000 inhabitants in the year to December 2007 (Lancashire average 89.4), a fall of 8.1% on the previous twelve months

== Media gallery ==
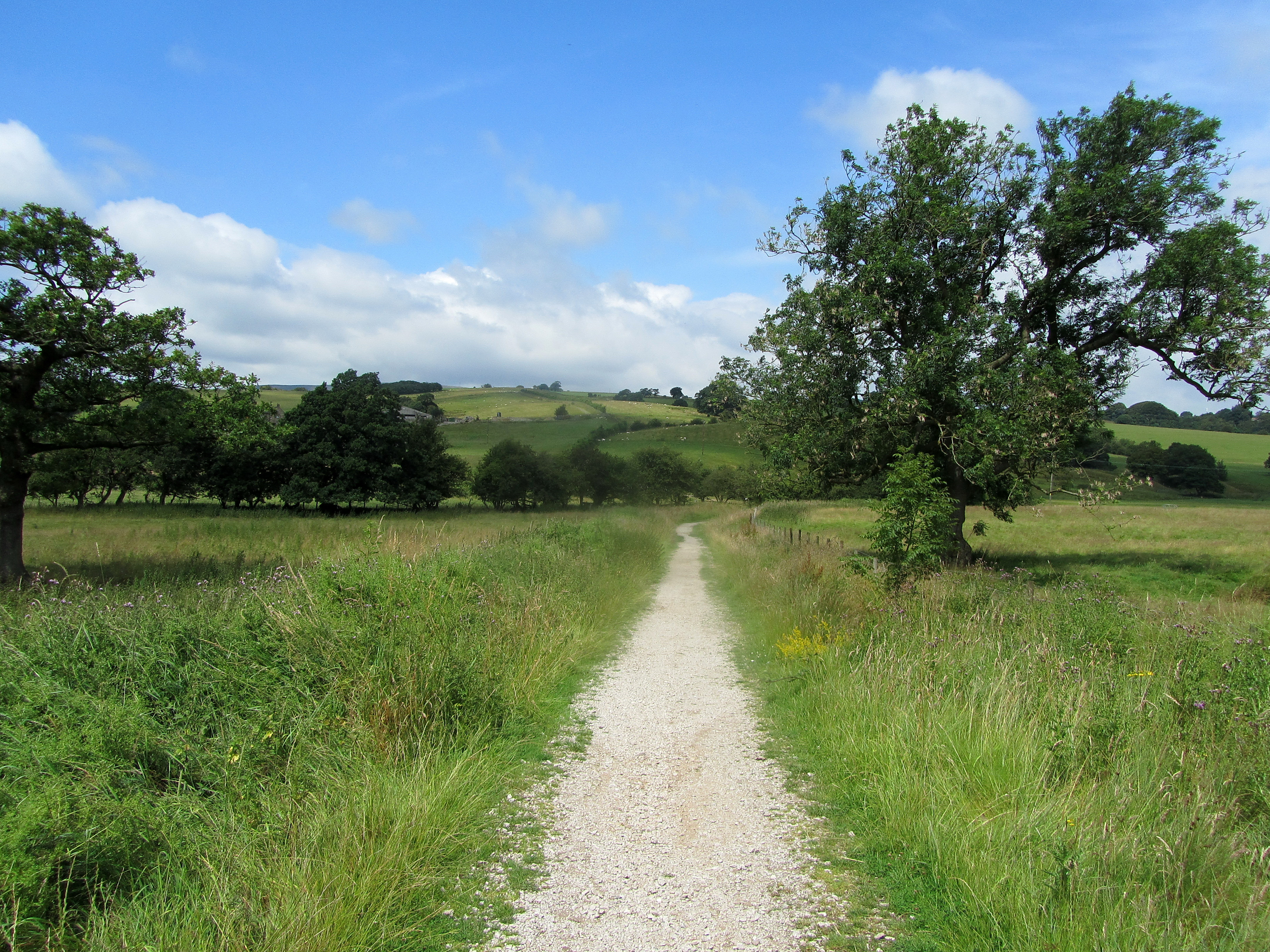
Descending towards the River Calder on the Burnley Way

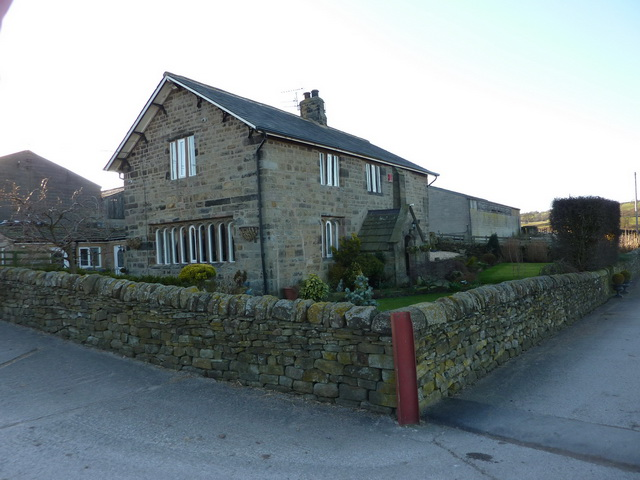
High Whittaker

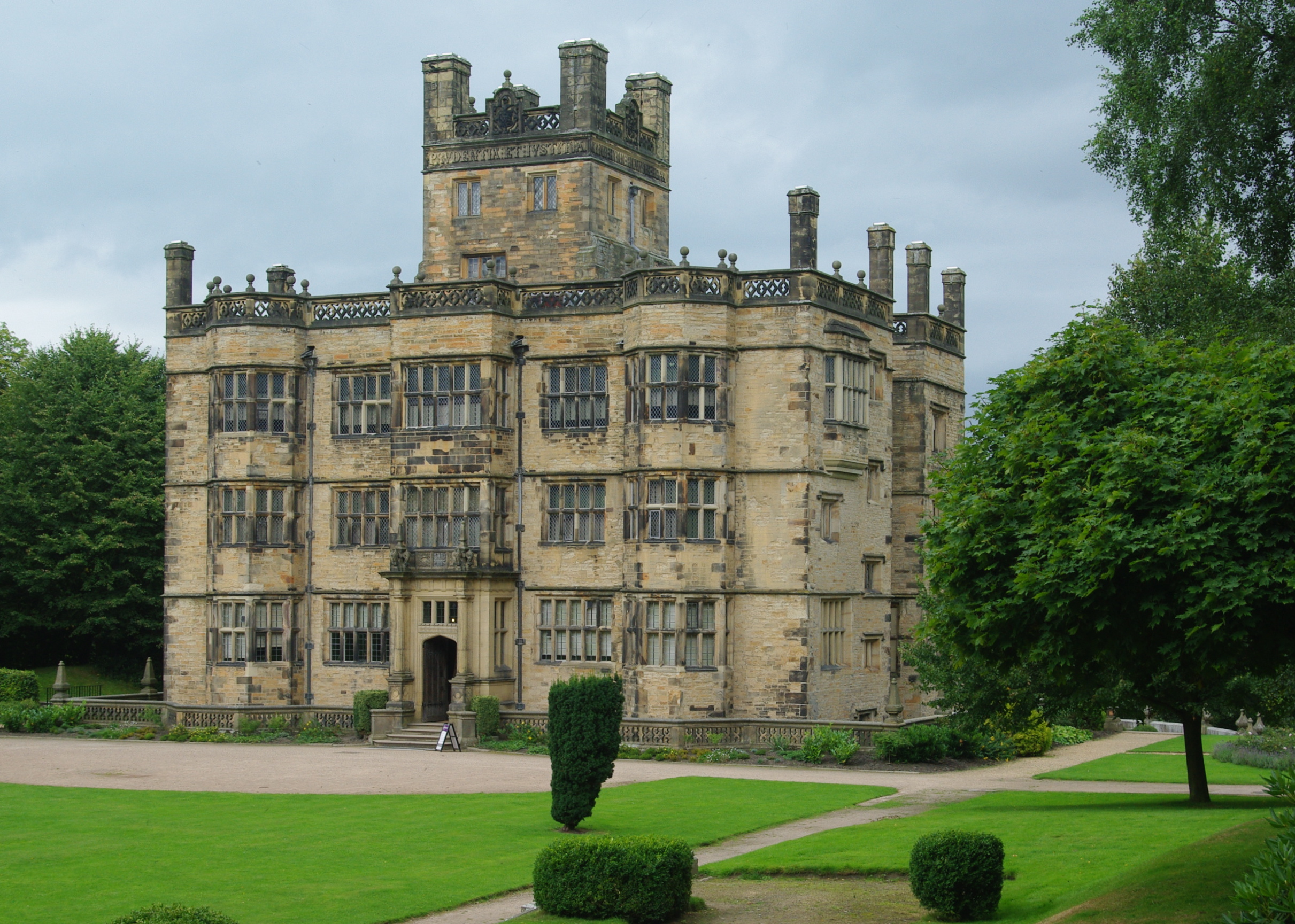
Gawthorpe Hall

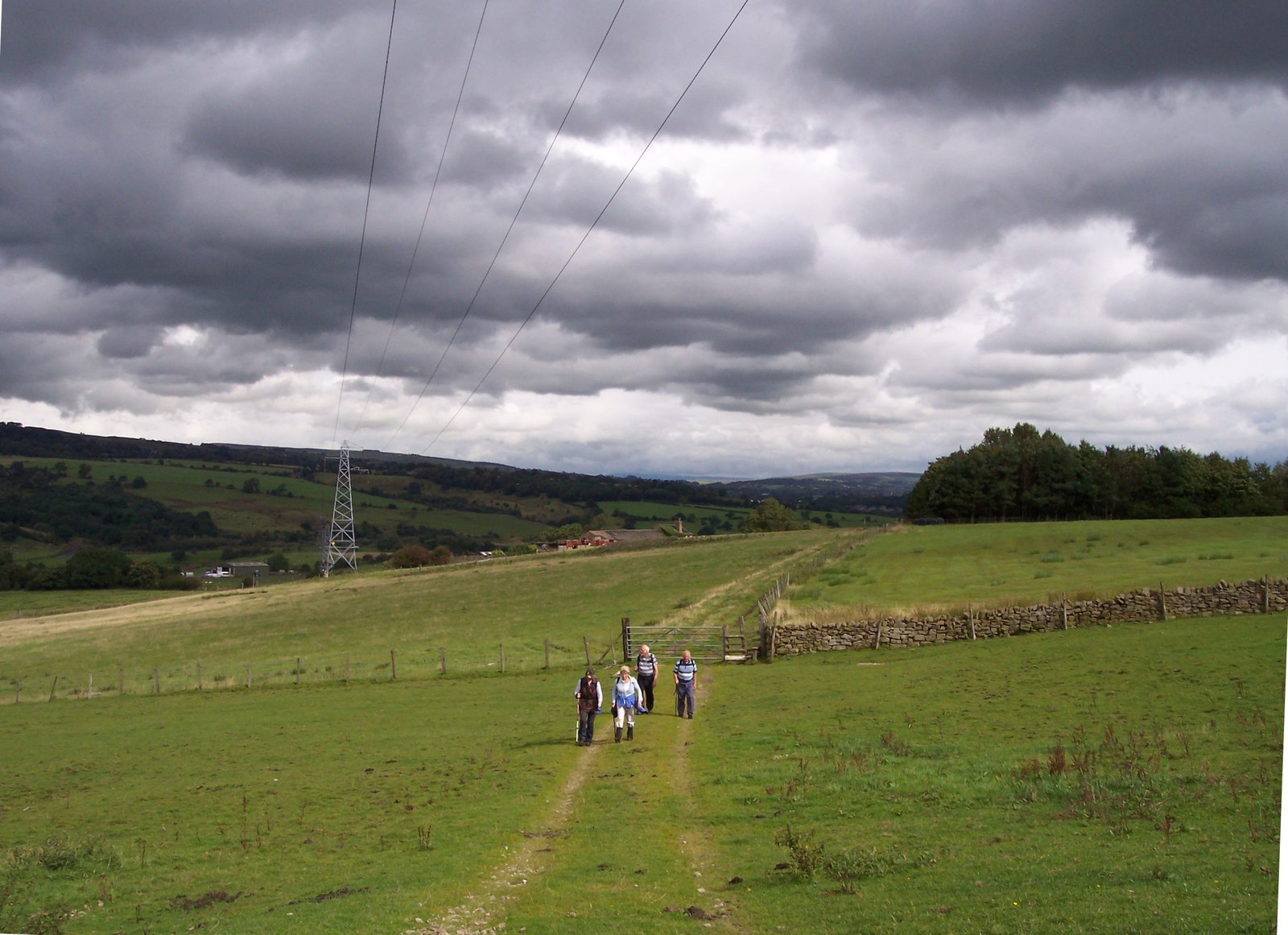
The Brontë Way also passes through the parish

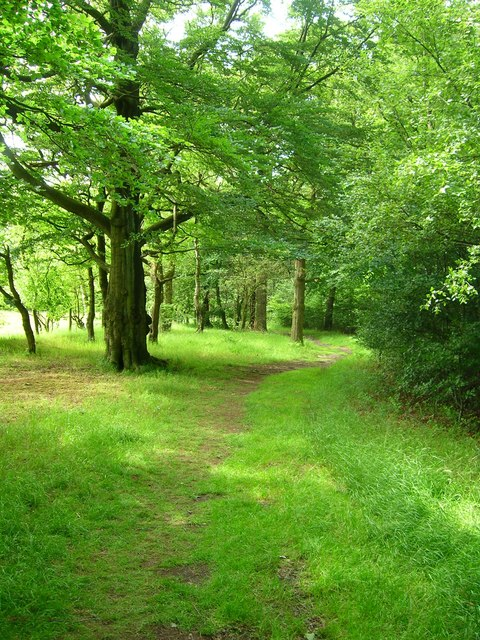
Hagg Wood

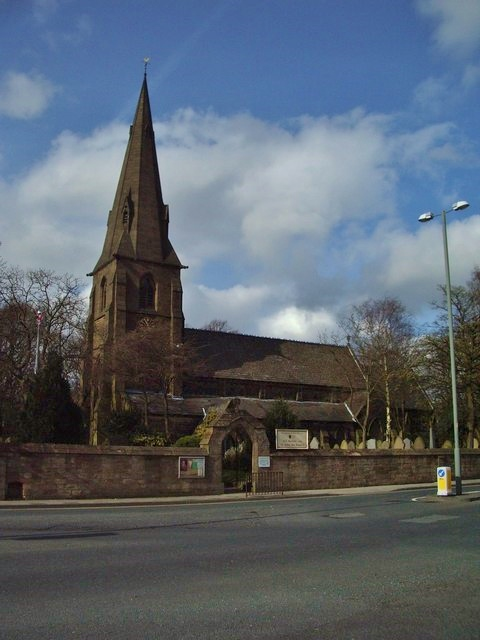
All Saints with St John the Baptist Church

== See also ==
- Listed buildings in Ightenhill
- Scheduled monuments in Lancashire
