= Fence, Lancashire =

Village in Lancashire, England

Coordinates: 53.833°N 2.260°W

Fence
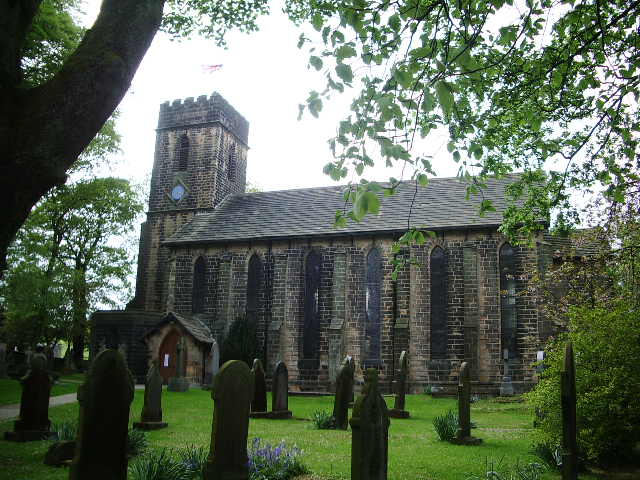
- St Anne's Church

- Location in Pendle Borough Location within Lancashire
- Population: 1,586 (2001)
- OS grid reference: SD829375
- Civil parish: Old Laund Booth
- District: Pendle
- Shire county: Lancashire
- Region: North West
- Country: England
- Sovereign state: United Kingdom
- Post town: BURNLEY
- Postcode district: BB12
- Dialling code: 01282
- Police: Lancashire
- Fire: Lancashire
- Ambulance: North West
- UK Parliament: Pendle and Clitheroe

Fence is a village in the civil parish of Old Laund Booth, Pendle, Lancashire, England, close to the towns of Nelson and Burnley. It lies alongside the A6068 road, known locally as the Padiham bypass. The parish (which includes the adjoining village of Wheatley Lane) has a population of 1,586.

Fence is a small village along 'Wheatley Lane Road', It abuts the sister village of Wheatley Lane. Because of this, Fence and Wheatley Lane are often referred to together as 'Fence'. The present village now terminates to the west past St Anne's church, where the new bypass cuts the line of the old road.

Fence was in the Hundred of Blackburn. Up until late medieval times, it lay in the Forest of Pendle, the hunting preserve of the King. The name of the village, is derived from the fact that an enclosure was erected in the area, within which the King's deer were kept. This became known as the "Fence", and the community that built up around it over time took the name.

In 1507, Henry VII "surrendered [the parcel called the Fence] to the use of the tenants of Higham, West Close and Goldshaw Booth, to be held by them and their heirs for ever."

The first mention of Fence, is in a document of 1402, as 'Fens in Penhill'. Being near Pendle Hill, Fence has a long shared history with other Pendleside villages, and the Pendle Witches, some old local surnames are shared with the historical witches; for example, the Nutter family name.

Cuckstool Lane, which runs south from the War Memorial was the original site of the village ducking stool, where (the story has it) suspected witches were immersed in a pond, or more likely 'cuckolds', those suspected of adultery. Hoarstones, which lies inside Fence, was the site of an ancient stone circle, and also the starting point for the 1633 witchcraft trials (see the entry under Wheatley Lane).

The older properties on the village consist largely of small stone built cottages, with later housing developments from the 1960s onwards. There is unbroken countryside with fine walking country to the North to Pendle Hill and surrounding areas.

The villages are served by St Anne's church (CoE), two Methodist chapels and a primary school.

== Notable people ==
- James Hargreaves (1834–1915), a British chemist and an inventor, born at Hoarstones in Fence.

== See also ==
- Listed buildings in Old Laund Booth
