= Newchurch in Pendle =

Village in Lancashire, England

Coordinates: 53.850°N 2.272°W

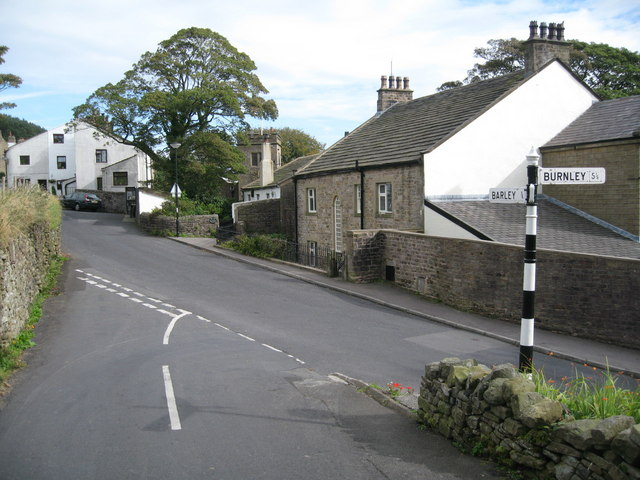
- Newchurch in Pendle

- Location in Pendle Borough Location in the Forest of Bowland AONB Location within Lancashire
- OS grid reference: SD821393
- Civil parish: Goldshaw Booth
- District: Pendle
- Shire county: Lancashire
- Region: North West
- Country: England
- Sovereign state: United Kingdom
- Post town: BURNLEY
- Postcode district: BB12
- Dialling code: 01282
- Police: Lancashire
- Fire: Lancashire
- Ambulance: North West
- UK Parliament: Pendle and Clitheroe

Newchurch in Pendle is a village in the civil parish of Goldshaw Booth, Pendle, Lancashire, England, adjacent to Barley, to the south of Pendle Hill. It was formerly part of Roughlee Booth until its transferral in 1935.

== History ==
Famous for the Demdike family of Pendle witches who lived there in the 17th century. Newchurch used to be called 'Goldshaw Booth' and later 'Newchurch in Pendle Forest', however, this was shortened to 'Newchurch in Pendle'.

St Mary's Church at the centre of the village is steeped in history. The church is not easily visible from the road, as it lies on the downward side of a steep hill, with a row of houses at the top and the primary school, St Mary's Church of England School, to the side. There was a chapel of ease on this site in 1250 and a later chapel was dedicated in 1544. The tower, although restored, is the only remaining part of that building.

The current church was probably built in the 17th century, it was only completed in 1740. The "Eye of God" is built into the west side of the tower as a deterrent from evil spirits. To the east of the porch, up against the south wall, is the grave of a member of the Nutter family (carved with a skull and crossbones). Local legend has it that it is the last resting place of Alice Nutter, one of the famous Pendle witches. However, executed witches were not normally buried in consecrated ground, and the skull and crossbones is a common memento mori device used to remind onlookers of their own mortality. So it can be fairly confidently asserted that the legend is in fact a myth. The ancient ceremony of rushbearing is performed. A procession is led around the village, the new Rushbearing Queen is crowned and is followed by a service of thanksgiving in the church.

== See also ==
- Listed buildings in Goldshaw Booth
