= Old Laund Booth =

Civil parish in Lancashire, England

Coordinates: 53.833°N 2.260°W

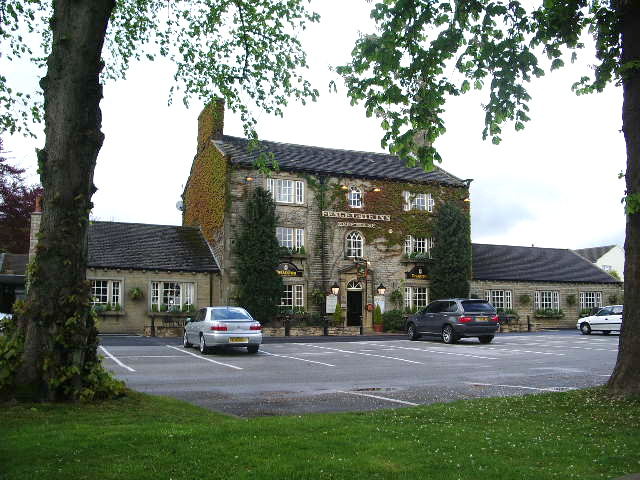
- Fence Gate Inn, Fence

- Location in Pendle Borough Location within Lancashire
- Population: 1,459 (2011)
- OS grid reference: SD8240
- Civil parish: Old Laund Booth
- District: Pendle
- Shire county: Lancashire
- Region: North West
- Country: England
- Sovereign state: United Kingdom
- Post town: BURNLEY
- Postcode district: BB12
- Dialling code: 01282
- Police: Lancashire
- Fire: Lancashire
- Ambulance: North West
- UK Parliament: Pendle and Clitheroe

Old Laund Booth is a civil parish in the Pendle district of Lancashire, England. It has a population of 1,459, and contains the villages of Fence and Wheatley Lane.

Old Laund Booth was once a township in the ancient parish of Whalley. This became a civil parish in 1866, forming part of the Burnley Rural District from 1894 (until 1974). Until 1898 when the parish was enlarged, part of Goldshaw Booth and a detached area Higham with West Close Booth, divided the township into two parts with Fence in the eastern and Wheatley Lane and Old Laund hall in the western. In 1935 the civil parish of Wheatley Carr Booth was abolished and the area also joined this parish.

The parish adjoins the Pendle parishes of Roughlee Booth, Barrowford, Nelson, Brierfield, Reedley Hallows, Higham-with-West Close Booth and Goldshaw Booth. Higher areas of the parish, north-east of the villages are part of the Forest of Bowland Area of Outstanding Natural Beauty (AONB).

According to the United Kingdom Census 2011, the parish has a population of 1,459, a decrease from 1,586 in the 2001 census.

== Media gallery ==
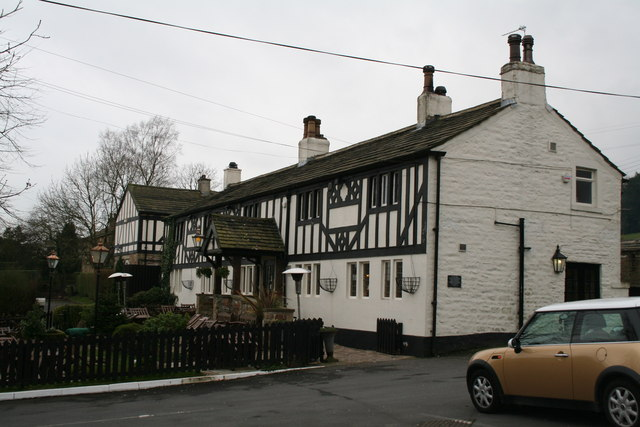
Ye Old Sparrow Hawk, Wheatley Lane

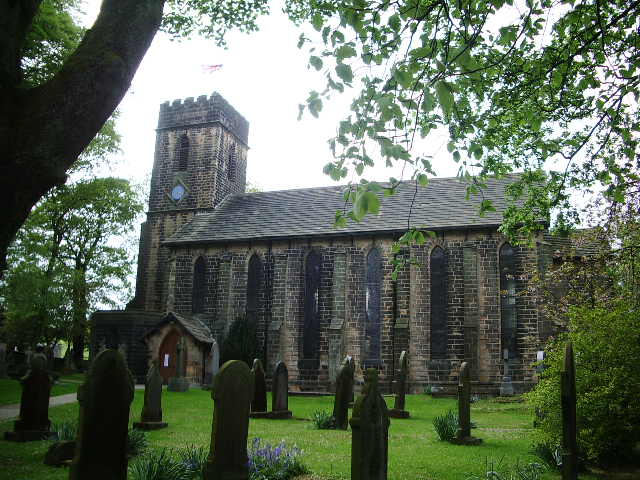
St Anne's Church, Fence

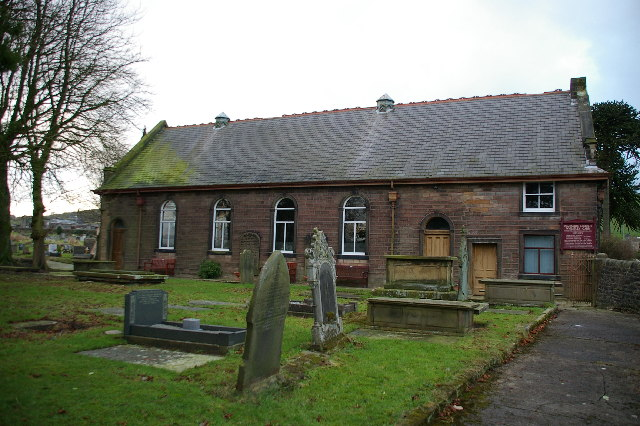
Inghamite Church, Wheatley Lane

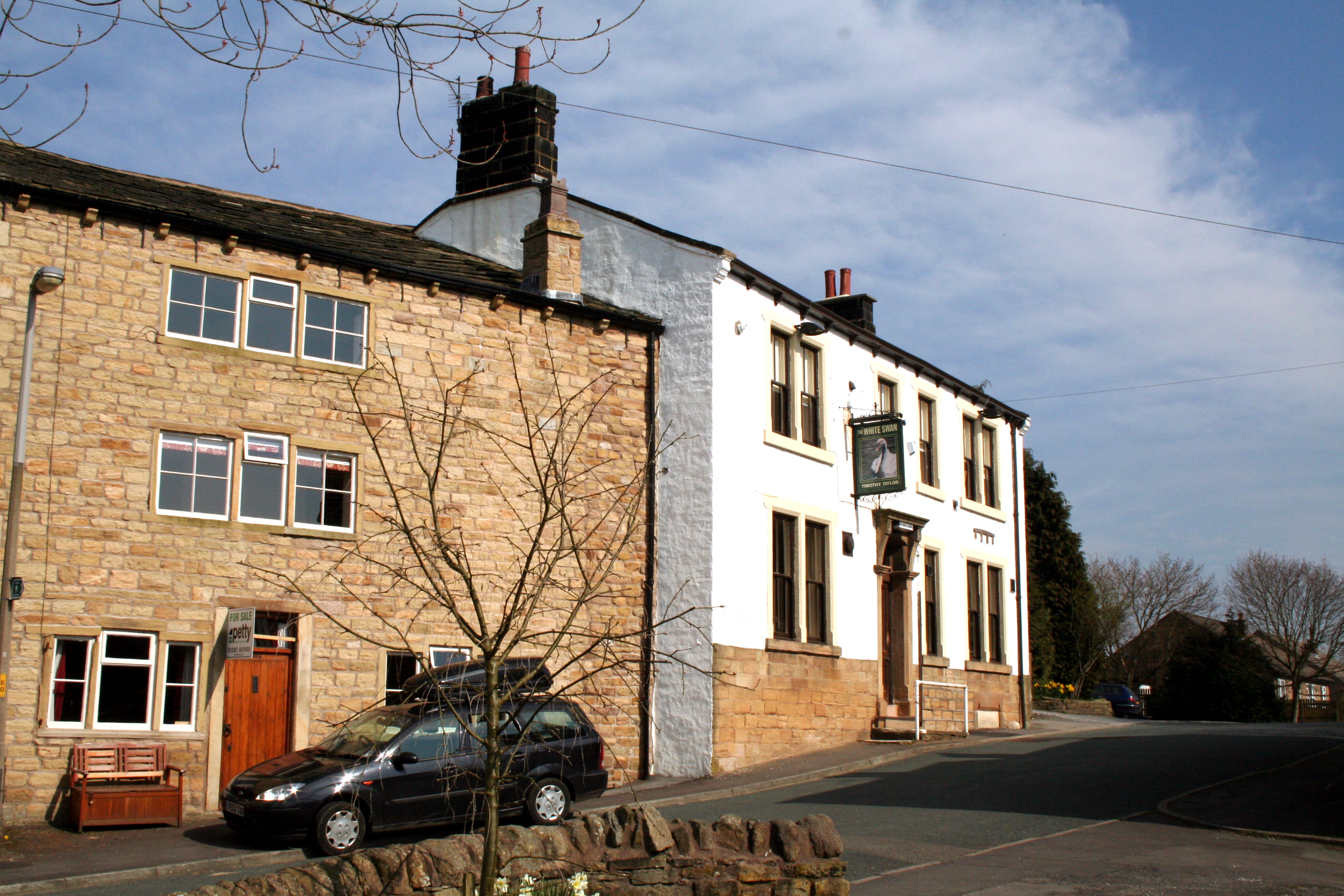
The White Swan, Wheatley Lane

== See also ==
- Listed buildings in Old Laund Booth
