= Sabden =

Village in Lancashire, England

Coordinates: 53.833°N 2.336°W

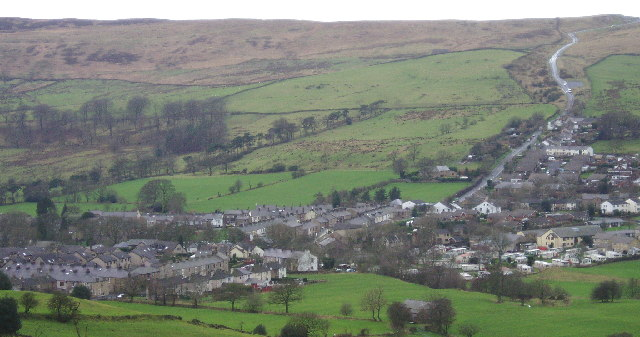
- Sabden viewed from Padiham Heights

- Location in Ribble Valley Borough Location in the Forest of Bowland AONB Location within Lancashire
- Population: 1,422 (2011)
- OS grid reference: SD779374
- Civil parish: Sabden
- District: Ribble Valley
- Shire county: Lancashire
- Region: North West
- Country: England
- Sovereign state: United Kingdom
- Post town: CLITHEROE
- Postcode district: BB7
- Dialling code: 01282
- Police: Lancashire
- Fire: Lancashire
- Ambulance: North West
- UK Parliament: Ribble Valley

Sabden is a village and civil parish in the Ribble Valley, Lancashire, England. Sabden is located south of Pendle Hill, in a valley about three miles north west of Padiham. The parish covers 2,450.9 acres (991.85 ha), of which 103.2 acres (41.75 ha) is occupied by the village. It lies in the Forest of Pendle section of the Forest of Bowland Area of Outstanding Natural Beauty.

== Toponymy ==
Sabden is believed to have been derived from Old English sceppe denu, meaning "spruce valley." The name occurs as early as 1296 as "Sapedene;" however, this likely refers to Sabden Hall, located in the hamlet now known as Sabden Fold in Goldshaw Booth.

== History ==
In 1387 Sapenden Haye (Sabden Hey) was demised by John of Gaunt to Thomas de Radcliffe. A bridge is mentioned near here in 1425.

Both Yates' 1786 and Greenwood's 1818 maps of Lancashire mark two settlements at this site: Hey-houfes and Sabden Bridge. It was known as Sabden Hey and Heyhouses when it developed into a hamlet.

The Starkie family of Huntroyde Hall near Padiham were landowners in Heyhouses from at least 1787. In 1801, Le Gendre Piers Starkie purchased the remaining portion to add to the Huntroyde estate. The family were the patrons of St. Nicholas' church (built in 1841).

The early 19th-century Beauties of England and Wales series describes the "extensive factory and print grounds of Messrs Miller, Burys & Co" here. Leaving the place unnamed, it mentions the remoteness of the site, and that the owners had built a company shop and chapel for the 2,000 employees.

Farming and quarrying were the mainstays from the 16th century with many small farms and several quarries. There is still a good example of a very old vaccary (medieval cattle farm) wall at the roadside near the ancient Stainscomb property east of the village. In the later 18th and the 19th century fabric printing and weaving industries took over.

Strings of Lime gals (Galloway ponies) were a common site from the mid 18th century into the late 19th century; they generally carried slate, lime and coal, making their way through Sabden going between the Burnley coal fields and the Clitheroe / Chatburn lime kilns.

The small community of 1818

The Weavers Arms was a public house, now long closed; it was on the Top Row.

The Old Black Bull, previously the Printers Arms, (the large house next to the bridge) was a pub until the 1960s.

The water quality in the valley suited the calico printing industry and more printworks developed along Sabden Brook. The industry kept going until 1931. At one stage there were seven mills in the village employing over 2,000 people; this meant many workers travelled to work daily from surrounding towns and villages on foot, many working a twelve hour shift or more.

The presence of the mills meant an increasing demand for transport for people, coal, raw materials and finished goods. This led to the formation of the Clitheroe, Burnley and Sabden Railway Company, who issued shares, but the railway never came. Many of the houses were built for the mill workers by the mill owners.

The location of the village led to difficulties in administration, as it was split between the townships of Pendleton and Read (in differing poor law unions and rural districts). Tax rates differed in the two sides of the village and there were difficulties with water provision, sewerage and road maintenance. When a school board was created in 1894 it required the taxation of six different townships. In 1904, after about six years of negotiations, the civil parish of Sabden was formed.

Wesley Street was known as Long Row (the longest row at the time). Badger Wells Water (a tributary brook) originally ran down Littlemoor and joined Sabden Brook near Bull Bridge, not as it now does, down the rear of Wesley Street. This is confirmed on the 1818 map on the right, where the Pendle Forest border follows the water course directly south to join the main brook near the bridge.

In 1847, there were two bridges at the bottom of Wesley Street, one for Clitheroe Road and one for Whalley Road, both for the Badgers Wells Water. There were no houses on the west side of Padiham Road or south of Whalley road. The garages at the bottom of Wesley Street were once the first ten on the street, one up one down houses, back to back. This explains why the numbers now begin at 12; they were known as Centre Row.

== Governance ==
Sabden became a civil parish in 1904, when it was formed from the township of Heyhouses, parts of the six parishes of Goldshaw Booth, Higham with West Close Booth, Northtown and Read, all in the Burnley Rural District, and from Pendleton and Wiswell in the Clitheroe Rural District. Sabden remained in the Burnley Rural District until the local government reforms of 1974.

The village is in the single member Sabden Ward of the Ribble Valley Borough Council.

== Geography ==
The staggered crossroads are five hundred feet above sea level and due to its position on Pendle Hill, the village is usually some 2 °C colder than the surrounding settlements of Clitheroe and Whalley. The highest point on a road is the Nick of Pendle at 993 feet and on land Spence Moor at 1,462 feet.

Badger Wells Water (brook) runs from the flanks of Pendle and Churn Clough Reservoir above the village to the north east and is culverted down Whalley Road, before joining Sabden Brook. A tributary of the River Calder, the brook runs under Bull Bridge (named after the pub which closed many years ago) and down through the centre of the village towards Whalley. To the south of the village on the hill, lies Sabden Wood. The main rock type in Sabden is Lancashire gritstone, and the soil is mainly clay-based.

== Demography ==
In the census of 2001, Sabden had a population of 1,371, and as of 2011 had grown to 1,422 with 614 households. However, since 2011, plans for multiple new plots at the mills of Watt Street have meant that as of 2012/13, the village's population will increase dramatically to an estimated 1,800–2,000.

== Economy ==
There are two pubs in the village, the Pendle Witch on Whalley Road and the White Hart Inn on Padiham Road. Sabden also has two convenience shops, one containing a post office. Union Mill, at the end of Watt Street is now a business centre, on the site of the former Pendle Antiques Centre. This business centre is occupied by multiple businesses including a telecommunications manufacturer (DAC), an avionics company (Lynx Avionics), a kitchen's studio and a cafe and sandwich shop. Industry was more prominent in the past when Sabden had a furniture making company, 'Contrast'.

However, as of spring 2012, much of the old Cobden Mill (named after Richard Cobden) had been demolished to make way for housing development, which only left the modern built Falcon House with its car park. 'Marbill' also moved to a nearby village, and the derelict building is allocated for homes.

== Education ==
Sabden has two primary schools, St Mary's RC Primary School and Sabden County Primary School.

The village is in the catchment area of the Clitheroe Royal Grammar School, Ribblesdale High School and St Augustine's RC High School, Billington.

== Sport ==
The second stage of the Tour of Britain Women's cycle race passed through Sabden in 2026.

== People ==
- Carey Foster (1835–1919), Professor of Physics at University College London, was born in the village.
- Richard Cobden was a well-known free-trade politician, and contributed to the village history, with Cobden Farm and the now demolished Cobden Mill replaced by Cobden Court (new housing) all hold his surname.

== Gallery ==
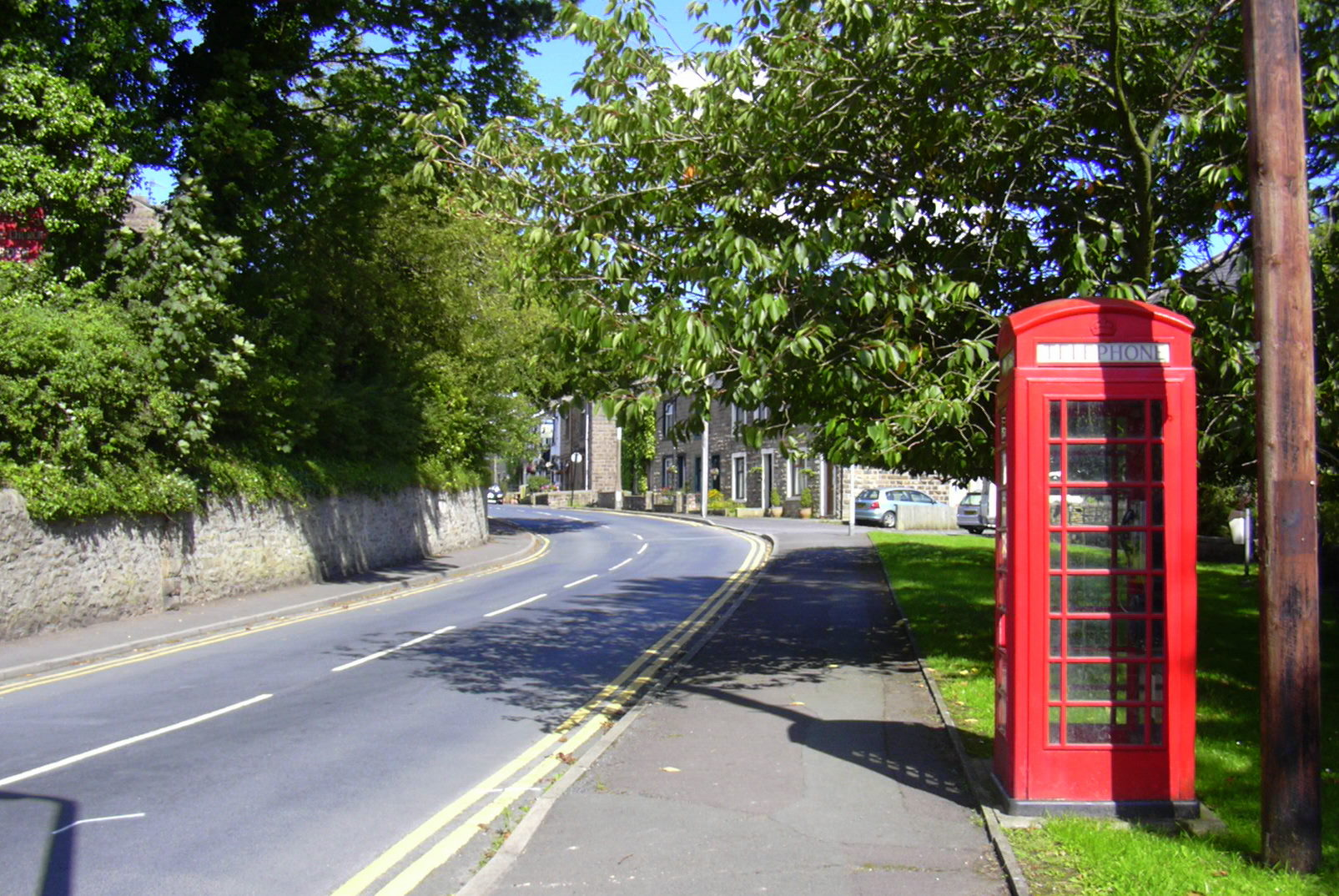
Whalley Road looking east

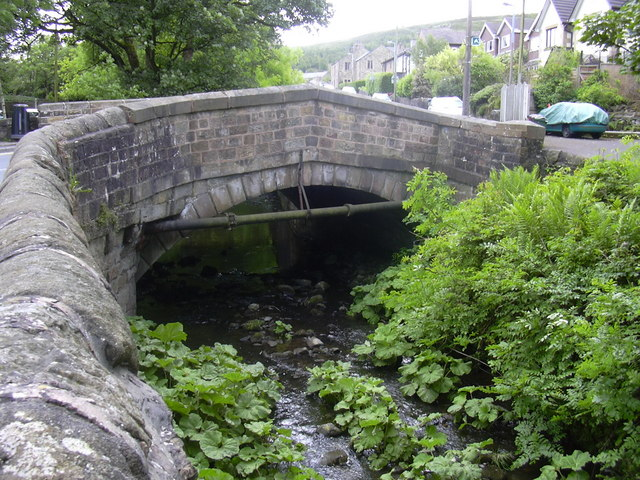
Sabden Bridge

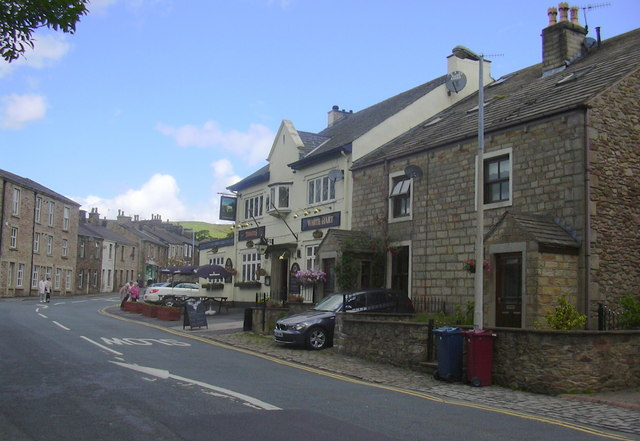
Padiham Road looking north

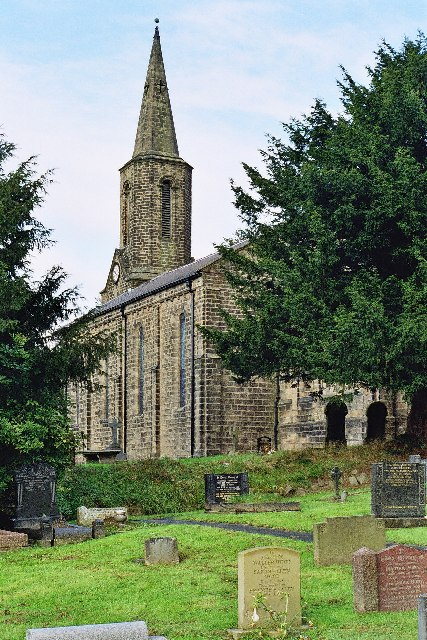
St Nicholas Church, Heyhouses

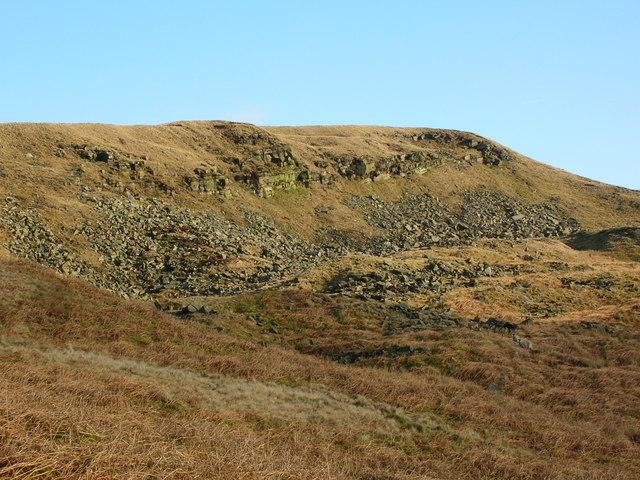
Deerstones, A rocky outcrop in the northwest of the parish

== See also ==
- Listed buildings in Sabden
