= Borough of Pendle =

Coordinates: 53.869°N 2.164°W

- Borough
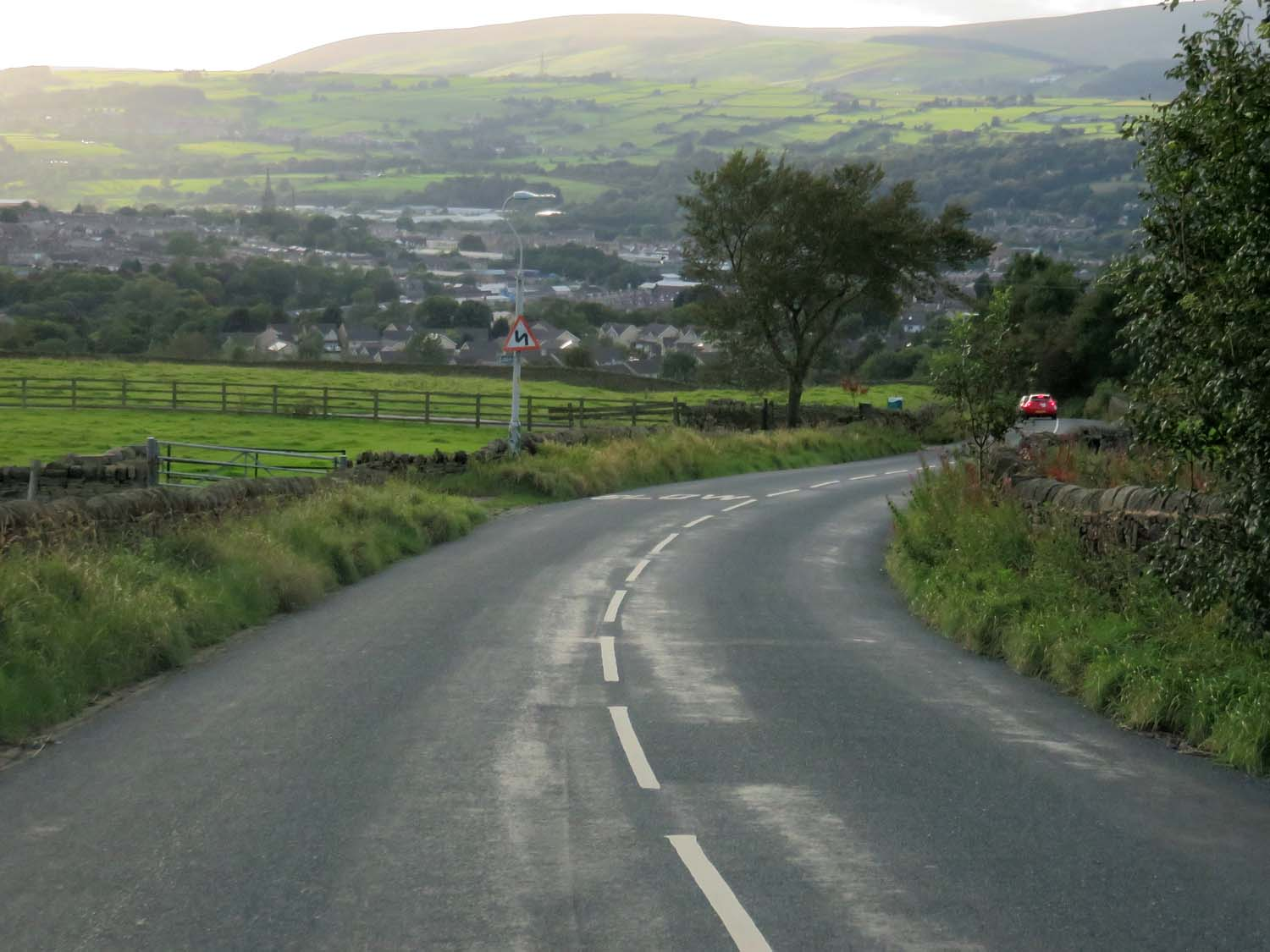
- Skyline of Nelson from Barkerhouse Road

- Shown within Lancashire and England
- Sovereign state: United Kingdom
- Constituent country: England
- Region: North West England
- Ceremonial county: Lancashire
- Admin. HQ: Nelson

Government
  - Type: Pendle Borough Council
  - Leadership: Leader & Cabinet
  - MPs: Jonathan Hinder (Lab, Pendle and Clitheroe)

Area
  - Total: 65 sq mi (169 km^{2})
  - Rank: 155th

Population (2025)
  - Total: 100,203
  - Rank: Ranked 251st
  - Density: 1,540/sq mi (593/km^{2})

Ethnicity (2021)
  - Ethnic groups: List: 70.6% White; 26.7% Asian; 1.6% Mixed; 0.9% other; 0.3% Black

Religion (2021)
  - Religion: List: 39.2% Christianity; 28.7% no religion; 26% Islam; 5.3% not stated; 0.4% other; 0.2% Buddhism; 0.1% Hinduism; 0.04% Sikhism; 0.03% Judaism
- Time zone: UTC+0 (Greenwich Mean Time)
  - Summer (DST): UTC+1 (British Summer Time)
- ONS code: 30UJ (ONS); E07000122 (GSS)
- NUTS 3: UKD46

Pendle is a local government district with borough status in Lancashire, England. The council is based in Nelson, the borough's largest town. The borough also includes the towns of Barnoldswick, Brierfield, Colne and Earby along with the surrounding villages and rural areas. Part of the borough lies within the Forest of Bowland Area of Outstanding Natural Beauty.

The neighbouring districts are Burnley, Ribble Valley, North Yorkshire, Bradford and Calderdale.

== Etymology ==
The name Pendle comes from "Penhill", combining the Cumbric "pen" meaning hill and the Saxon "hill", also meaning hill. The name was used for Pendle Hill (literally "hill hill hill"), a prominent outlier of the Pennines. The name was then also used for the ancient Forest of Pendle around the hill, and for Pendle Water, a river which rises on the hill and flows into the River Calder. The name also became associated with the Pendle witches, tried for witchcraft in 1612, as the accused were all from the area.

== History ==
The modern local government district of Pendle was created on 1 April 1974 under the Local Government Act 1972. It covered the whole area of seven former districts and parts of another two, all of which were abolished at the same time:

- Barnoldswick Urban District
- Barrowford Urban District
- Brierfield
- Burnley Rural District (part)
- Colne Municipal Borough
- Earby Urban District
- Nelson Municipal Borough
- Skipton Rural District (part)
- Trawden Urban District

The Barnoldswick, Earby and Skipton elements were in the West Riding of Yorkshire prior to 1974. The term West Craven is often used for the area transferred from Yorkshire to Lancashire in 1974. The new district was named Pendle after the hill. The district was awarded borough status on 15 September 1976, allowing the chair of the council to take the title of mayor.

Under current local government reorganisation plans, all district councils in Lancashire, as well as the county council, will be abolished in 2028, with the district becoming part of a new Pennine Lancashire unitary authority.

== Governance ==
- See main article: Pendle Borough Council

== Economy ==
Major employers in the borough include Rolls-Royce plc, Silentnight and the Daisy Group.

== Media ==
In terms of television, the area is served by BBC North West and ITV Granada which broadcast from Salford. Television signals are received from the Winter Hill TV transmitter and the local relay TV transmitter located in the Forest of Pendle. A small part of the borough around Barnoldswick and Earby is served by BBC Yorkshire and ITV Yorkshire broadcasting from Leeds. This area is served by a local transmitter in Skipton which is relayed from the Emley Moor TV transmitter.

Radio stations for the area are:

- BBC Radio Lancashire
- Heart North West
- Capital Manchester and Lancashire (formerly 2BR)
- Greatest Hits Radio Lancashire
- Smooth North West
- Pendle Community Radio, the borough's local community based station which broadcast from its studios in Nelson.

The area is served by the regional newspaper, Lancashire Telegraph. Other local newspapers include Pendle Express and The Nelson Leader.

== Places in Pendle ==
The borough is entirely covered by civil parishes. The parish councils for Barnoldswick, Brierfield, Colne, Earby and Nelson take the style "town council".

Parishes in Pendle Borough

Contemporary civil parish	Map ref	Medieval jurisdiction	Medieval jurisdiction	Early modern jurisdiction
Barley-with-Wheatley Booth	1	Pendle Forest, manor of Ightenhill	Forest of Blackburnshire	Whalley, Lancashire: once a much larger parish than today. It encompassed a large part of eastern Lancashire. It also included areas outside Pendle.
Barrowford	3	Pendle Forest, manor of Ightenhill	Forest of Blackburnshire	Whalley, Lancashire: once a much larger parish than today. It encompassed a large part of eastern Lancashire. It also included areas outside Pendle.
Blacko	4	Pendle Forest, manor of Ightenhill	Forest of Blackburnshire	Whalley, Lancashire: once a much larger parish than today. It encompassed a large part of eastern Lancashire. It also included areas outside Pendle.
Old Laund Booth	15	Pendle Forest, manor of Ightenhill	Forest of Blackburnshire	Whalley, Lancashire: once a much larger parish than today. It encompassed a large part of eastern Lancashire. It also included areas outside Pendle.
Goldshaw Booth	10	Pendle Forest, manor of Ightenhill	Forest of Blackburnshire	Whalley, Lancashire: once a much larger parish than today. It encompassed a large part of eastern Lancashire. It also included areas outside Pendle.
Reedley Hallows	16	Pendle Forest, manor of Ightenhill	Forest of Blackburnshire	Whalley, Lancashire: once a much larger parish than today. It encompassed a large part of eastern Lancashire. It also included areas outside Pendle.
Roughlee Booth	17	Pendle Forest, manor of Ightenhill	Forest of Blackburnshire	Whalley, Lancashire: once a much larger parish than today. It encompassed a large part of eastern Lancashire. It also included areas outside Pendle.
Higham-with-West Close Booth	11	Pendle Forest, manor of Ightenhill	Forest of Blackburnshire	Whalley, Lancashire: once a much larger parish than today. It encompassed a large part of eastern Lancashire. It also included areas outside Pendle.
Trawden Forest	19	Trawden Forest, manor of Colne	Forest of Blackburnshire	Whalley, Lancashire: once a much larger parish than today. It encompassed a large part of eastern Lancashire. It also included areas outside Pendle.
Nelson	14	manor of Ightenhill, not in Forest	Blackburnshire, not in Forest	Whalley, Lancashire: once a much larger parish than today. It encompassed a large part of eastern Lancashire. It also included areas outside Pendle.
Brierfield	6	manor of Ightenhill, not in Forest	Blackburnshire, not in Forest	Whalley, Lancashire: once a much larger parish than today. It encompassed a large part of eastern Lancashire. It also included areas outside Pendle.
Colne	7	manor of Colne, not in Forest	Blackburnshire, not in Forest	Whalley, Lancashire: once a much larger parish than today. It encompassed a large part of eastern Lancashire. It also included areas outside Pendle.
Foulridge	9	manor of Colne, not in Forest	Blackburnshire, not in Forest	Whalley, Lancashire: once a much larger parish than today. It encompassed a large part of eastern Lancashire. It also included areas outside Pendle.
Laneshaw Bridge	13	manor of Colne, not in Forest	Blackburnshire, not in Forest	Whalley, Lancashire: once a much larger parish than today. It encompassed a large part of eastern Lancashire. It also included areas outside Pendle.
Barnoldswick	2	Now referred to as "West Craven". This is a part of Lancashire, which was once in the neighbouring West Riding of Yorkshire. (Within the Wapentake of Staincliffe, Deanery of Craven.)		
Bracewell and Brogden	5	Now referred to as "West Craven". This is a part of Lancashire, which was once in the neighbouring West Riding of Yorkshire. (Within the Wapentake of Staincliffe, Deanery of Craven.)		
Salterforth	8	Now referred to as "West Craven". This is a part of Lancashire, which was once in the neighbouring West Riding of Yorkshire. (Within the Wapentake of Staincliffe, Deanery of Craven.)		
Kelbrook and Sough	12	Now referred to as "West Craven". This is a part of Lancashire, which was once in the neighbouring West Riding of Yorkshire. (Within the Wapentake of Staincliffe, Deanery of Craven.)		
Earby	18	Now referred to as "West Craven". This is a part of Lancashire, which was once in the neighbouring West Riding of Yorkshire. (Within the Wapentake of Staincliffe, Deanery of Craven.)		

Places in the Borough of Pendle Forest of Bowland AONB

== Freedom of the Borough ==
The following people and military units have received the Freedom of the Borough of Pendle.

=== Individuals ===
- Steven Burke: 2012.

=== Military Units ===
- The Queen's Lancashire Regiment: 2001.
- The Duke of Lancaster's Regiment: 1 July 2006.
