= Kelbrook and Sough =

Civil parish in Lancashire, England

Coordinates: 53.898°N 2.151°W

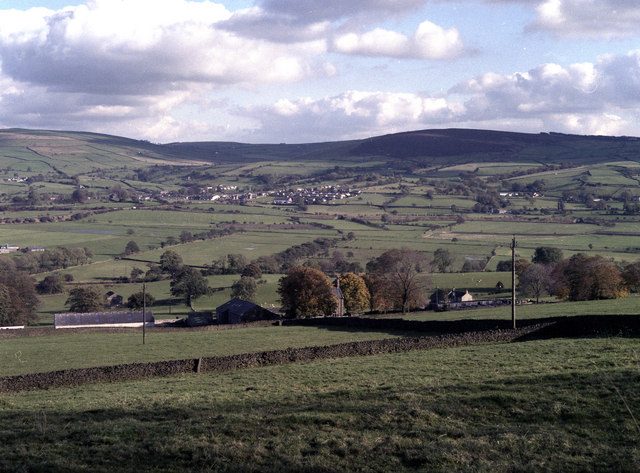
- Kelbrook countryside

- Location in Pendle Borough Location within Lancashire
- Population: 1,008 (2011)
- OS grid reference: SD9044
- Civil parish: Kelbrook and Sough
- District: Pendle
- Shire county: Lancashire
- Region: North West
- Country: England
- Sovereign state: United Kingdom
- Post town: BARNOLDSWICK
- Postcode district: BB18
- Dialling code: 01282
- Police: Lancashire
- Fire: Lancashire
- Ambulance: North West
- UK Parliament: Pendle

Kelbrook and Sough is a civil parish in the Pendle district of Lancashire, England. It has a population of 1,008, and contains the village of Kelbrook and neighbouring hamlet of Sough.

The parish adjoins the Pendle parishes of Laneshaw Bridge, Foulridge, Salterforth and Earby and West Yorkshire.

Prior to 1974 the area was part of the West Riding of Yorkshire.

According to the United Kingdom Census 2011, the parish has a population of 1,008, a decrease from 1,026 in the 2001 census.

The civil parish was created in 1992, from part of the unparished area that before 1974 had been the urban district of Earby.

On May 4, 2023, Kelbrook and Sough Parish Council held their first ever election.

Voted on to the Parish Council were:

Sharon Ashley, Christine Elley, Darren Galway, Val Kimberly, Debbie Richardson, Gary Slinger, Garry Wilson.

== Media gallery ==
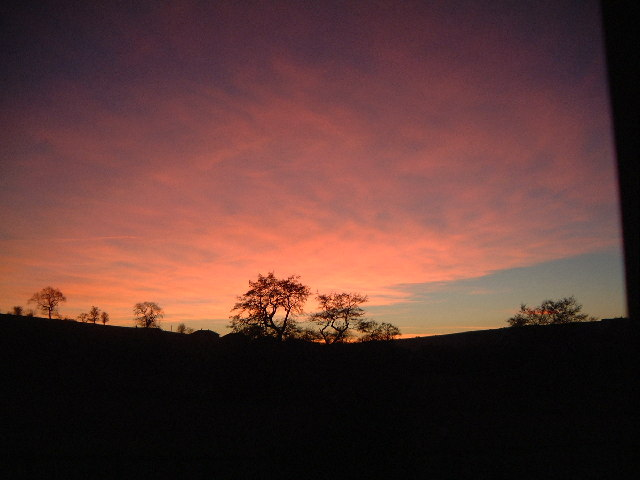
Sunset over Kelbrook

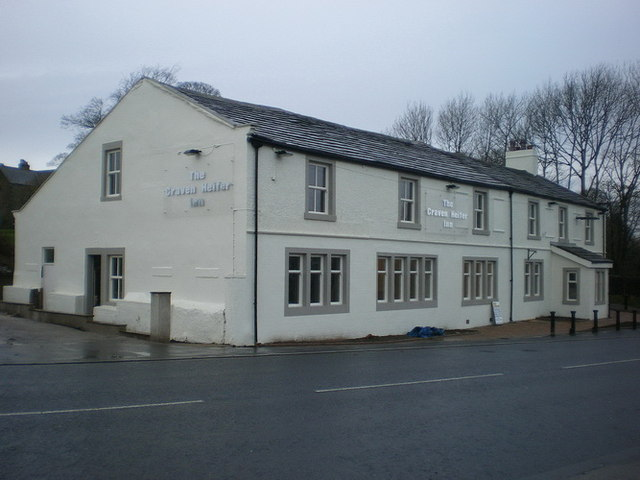
The Craven Heifer, Kelbrook

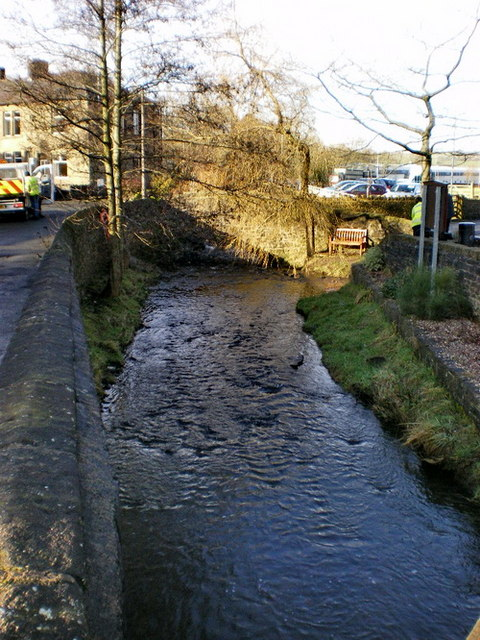
Kelbrook Beck

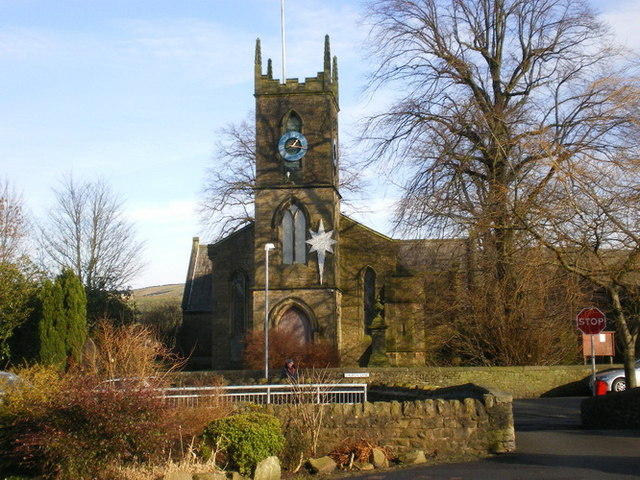
St Mary's Church, Kelbrook

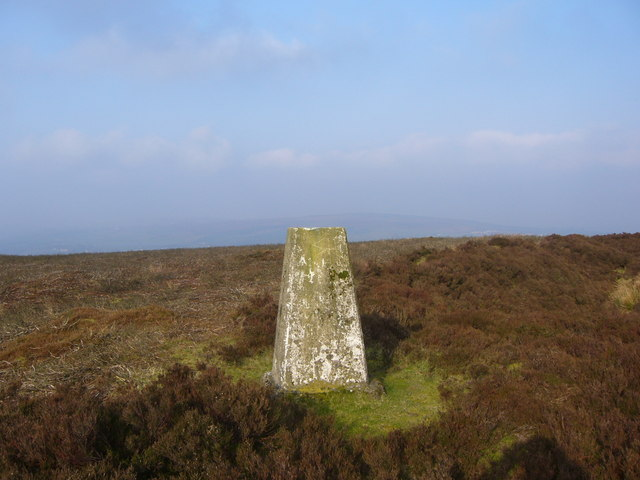
Trig point on Kelbrook Moor

== See also ==
Listed buildings in Kelbrook and Sough
