= Listed buildings in Foulridge =

Foulridge is a civil parish in Pendle, Lancashire, England. It contains 18 listed buildings that are recorded in the National Heritage List for England. Of these, two are at Grade II*, the middle grade, and the others are at Grade II, the lowest grade. The parish contains the village of Foulridge, and is otherwise rural. Most of the listed buildings are houses, farmhouses, and farm buildings. The Leeds and Liverpool Canal runs through the parish where it enters the Foulridge Tunnel. The entrance to the tunnel is listed, as are three bridges crossing the canal, and other structures associated with it.

== Key ==
Grade	Criteria
II*	Particularly important buildings of more than special interest
II	Buildings of national importance and special interest

== Buildings ==
Name and location	Photograph	Date	Notes	Grade
Ball House; 53.87733°N 2.18645°W	—	1627	The house is in stone and has a stone-slate roof and quoins. There are two storeys and two bays. On the front is a porch and a doorway with a moulded and inscribed surround. The windows are mullioned or mullioned and transomed and have dripstones. On the left return is a stepped chimney and a bay window.	II*
Moss Houses Farmhouse; 53.87193°N 2.14640°W	—	17th century	A stone house with a stone-slate roof and large quoins. There are two storeys and three bays. On the front is a two-storey gabled porch with a finial. The doorway has a chamfered surround and a four-centred arched head. Two of the three chimneys are external and stepped.	II
Great House Farmhouse; 53.87820°N 2.14640°W	—	1660	The farmhouse is in stone with a modern tile roof, and has two storeys with an attic. The windows are mullioned, the attic window being stepped. On the gables are finials.	II
Accornlee Hall Farmhouse; 53.88318°N 2.16237°W		Late 17th century (probable)	The house is in stone with a stone-slate roof, and has an H-shaped plan. The west front is symmetrical with gabled wings and a central two-storey jettied porch. The doorway has ogee moulding and a shaped lintel, and the windows are mullioned.	II*
Hey Fold Farm Cottages; 53.88661°N 2.17987°W	—	Late 17th to early 18th century (probable)	Formerly a farmhouse and attached cottage, later converted into a single dwelling, it is in sandstone with a stone-slate roof. The house has two storeys and two bays, and the former cottage, which is set back, has one bay with two storeys, and one bay with one storey. The windows are mullioned, and some openings have been blocked.	II
Breeze House; 53.87676°N 2.16763°W	—	Early 18th century (probable)	The house is in rendered stone with a stone-slate roof. There are two storeys and three bays. The windows are mullioned or mullioned and transomed. The central doorway has a chamfered surround, and at the rear is a round-headed stair window containing Gothick tracery.	II
Cornshaw Brook Farmhouse and barn 53.87636°N 2.14435°W	—	18th century	The house and barn are in stone with a stone-slate roof. The house has two storeys, sash windows, and a central doorway with a plain surround. The barn is to the left, projects forward, and contains one irregular window.	II
Hey Fold Farmhouse; 53.88640°N 2.17976°W	—	Late 18th century	A stone house with a blue slate roof in two storeys and with a symmetrical front. The windows are mullions, and the doorway has a plain surround and deep lintel.	II
Barn, Hey Fold Farm Cottages; 53.88655°N 2.17998°W	—	Late 18th century (probable)	The barn is in sandstone with a stone-slate roof. There are three bays, the centre and right bays protruding forward as an outshut containing a porch leading to a wagon entrance. In the first bay is a square-headed doorway with a plain surround and a cornice.	II
Canal House; 53.87885°N 2.17072°W		Late 18th century	A stone house with a stone-slate roof, in two storeys with a symmetrical front. The central doorway has a plain surround and a peaked hood, and the windows are mullioned with sashes.	II
Standing Stone Gate Farmhouse and barn 53.88257°N 2.18491°W	—	1791	The farmhouse and barn are in stone with a stone-slate roof. The house has quoins, and is in two storeys. On the front are two square windows in each floor with a mullion. The central doorway has a plain surround and a peaked hood. The barn is to the left, it projects forward and contains two square windows.	II
Daubers Bridge, (No 147); 53.88384°N 2.17108°W		1794	An accommodation bridge over the Leeds and Liverpool Canal. It is in stone, and consists of a single elliptical arch with voussoirs and a parapet with plain coping. The bridge has curved abutments that end in piers.	II
Hollinhurst Bridge, (No 148); 53.88611°N 2.17093°W		1794	An accommodation bridge over the Leeds and Liverpool Canal. It is in stone, and consists of a single elliptical arch with voussoirs and a parapet with plain coping. The bridge has curved abutments that end in piers.	II
Mill Hill Bridge, (No 149); 53.89000°N 2.17256°W		1794	An accommodation bridge over the Leeds and Liverpool Canal. It is in stone, and consists of a single elliptical arch with voussoirs and a parapet with plain coping. The bridge has curved abutments that end in piers.	II
Northern entrance, Foulridge Tunnel; 53.87807°N 2.17268°W		1796	The tunnel carries the Leeds and Liverpool Canal. Curving walls lead to a semicircular arch that is flanked by piers. The lower parts of the piers and arch have vermiculate rustication. There are stone steps on both sides of the arch.	II
Canal Warehouse; 53.87920°N 2.17091°W		Early 19th century	The warehouse is in stone with a stone-slate roof. It contains a segmental-headed doorway, square mullioned windows, and a loading bay. (Note: Street View in August 2009 shows that the warehouse has been converted into a café.)	II
Barn, Canal House; 53.87890°N 2.17075°W	—	19th century	The stone barn, attached to the left side of the house, has a stone-slate roof, and a doorway with a plain surround. (Note: Street View in October 2009 shows that the barn has been converted into domestic use.)	II
War memorial 53.87517°N 2.16837°W		1926	The war memorial stands on an elevated site at a road junction, and was designed by Sir Charles Nicholson. It is in sandstone from Salterforth Quarries and consists of a wheel-head cross on a slender tapering shaft. The shaft is on a square plinth on a base of four steps. There are inscriptions on the faces of the plinth, including the names of those lost in both World Wars.	II

== Notes and references ==
Notes

Citations

Sources

- Hartwell, Clare; Pevsner, Nikolaus (2009) [1969], Lancashire: North, The Buildings of England, New Haven and London: Yale University Press, ISBN 978-0-300-12667-9
- Historic England, "Ball House, Foulridge (1073357)", National Heritage List for England
- Historic England, "Moss Houses Farmhouse, Foulridge (1073356)", National Heritage List for England
- Historic England, "Great House Farmhouse, Foulridge (1361743)", National Heritage List for England
- Historic England, "Accornlee Hall Farmhouse, Foulridge (1361742)", National Heritage List for England
- Historic England, "Hey Fold Farm Cottages, Foulridge (1073393)", National Heritage List for England
- Historic England, "Breeze House, Foulridge (1073358)", National Heritage List for England
- Historic England, "Cornshaw Brook Farmhouse and barn abutting to west, Foulridge (1073396)", National Heritage List for England
- Historic England, "Hey Fold Farmhouse, Foulridge (1243337)", National Heritage List for England
- Historic England, "Barn attached to west end of Hey Fold Farm Cottages, Foulridge (1073394)", National Heritage List for England
- Historic England, "Canal House, Foulridge (1073360)", National Heritage List for England
- Historic England, "Standing Stone Gate Farmhouse and barn abutting to west, Foulridge (1073359)", National Heritage List for England
- Historic England, "Daubers Bridge No 147, Foulridge (1272914)", National Heritage List for England
- Historic England, "Hollinhurst Bridge No 148, Foulridge (1361723)", National Heritage List for England
- Historic England, "Mill Hill Bridge No 149, Foulridge (1272916)", National Heritage List for England
- Historic England, "Northern entrance to Foulridge Tunnel, Foulridge (1073395)", National Heritage List for England
- Historic England, "Canal Warehouse, Foulridge (1073361)", National Heritage List for England
- Historic England, "Barn adjoining Canal House to left, Foulridge (1361744)", National Heritage List for England
- Historic England, "Foulridge War Memorial, Foulridge (1439364)", National Heritage List for England
- Historic England, Listed Buildings
