= Sough, Lancashire =

Hamlet in Lancashire, England

Coordinates: 53.905°N 2.148°W

Sough
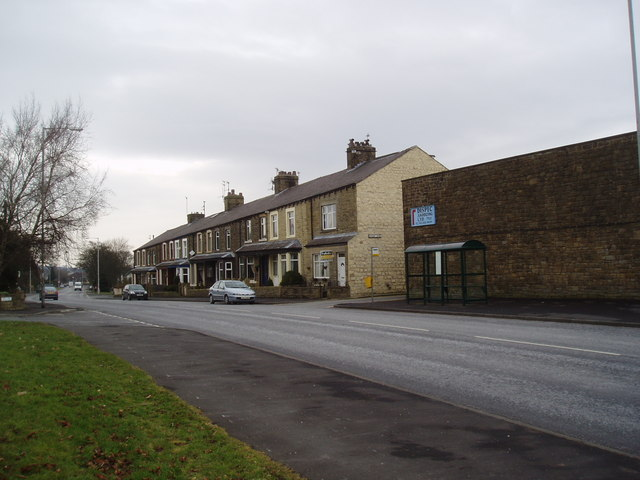
- The A56 road

- Location in Pendle Borough Location within Lancashire
- OS grid reference: SD902454
- Civil parish: Kelbrook and Sough
- District: Pendle
- Shire county: Lancashire
- Region: North West
- Country: England
- Sovereign state: United Kingdom
- Post town: BARNOLDSWICK
- Postcode district: BB18
- Dialling code: 01282
- Police: Lancashire
- Fire: Lancashire
- Ambulance: North West
- UK Parliament: Pendle and Clitheroe

Sough /sʌf/ is a hamlet, in the parish of Kelbrook and Sough, in Lancashire, England.

Sough is located east of the main A56 road between Earby and Kelbrook; it is in the area known as West Craven in the district of Pendle.

This area used to be part of Earby Urban District in the West Riding of Yorkshire until boundary changes in 1974.

In 2024 it was reported that the BB18 postcode, covering Barnoldswick, Earby, Kelbrook, Salterforth, and Sough was the area least affected by burglary in East Lancashire, with a rate of just 2.72.

== See also ==
- Listed buildings in Kelbrook and Sough
