= Listed buildings in Salterforth =

Salterforth is a civil parish in Pendle, Lancashire, England. It contains eleven listed buildings that are recorded in the National Heritage List for England. Of these, one is at Grade II*, the middle grade, and the others are at Grade II, the lowest grade. Apart from the village of Salterforth, the parish is entirely rural. Most of the listed buildings are houses and associated structures, and farmhouses. The Leeds and Liverpool Canal passes through the parish and the listed buildings associated with this are an aqueduct and two bridges. The other listed building is a public house.

== Key ==
Grade	Criteria
II*	Particularly important buildings of more than special interest
II	Buildings of national importance and special interest

== Buildings ==
Name and location	Photograph	Date	Notes	Grade
Glen Wood; 53.89037°N 2.18166°W	—	17th century	A cottage in stone with a stone-slate roof in two storeys. Mullions have been removed from the windows. The doorway has a chamfered surround.	II
Wood End Farmhouse; 53.89012°N 2.18140°W	—	1686	A stone house with a stone-slate roof in two storeys. The windows have chamfered surrounds and those in the lower floor have hood moulds. On the left side is a two-storey porch, and a doorway with a triangular head, a large inscribed lintel, and a hood mould.	II*
Lane Ends Farmhouse; 53.90654°N 2.16932°W	—	1697	The house is in stone with quoins and a stone-slate roof. It has two storeys and a central two-storey gabled porch. The doorway has a chamfered surround and an inscribed lintel. The windows are of varying sizes.	II
White House Farmhouse; 53.88804°N 2.18357°W	—	1698	The farmhouse is in stone with a stone-slate roof, and has two storeys. It has a two-storey porch with an inscribed lintel on the left return. The doorway has a chamfered surround. One of the windows has a mullion and a hood mould, others have been altered.	II
Mounting steps 53.90511°N 2.16934°W		18th century (possible)	The mounting block is in stone, and is about 3 feet (0.91 m) high. It consists of five steps on two sides leading up to a platform.	II
Higher Green Hall Farmhouse; 53.90155°N 2.17320°W	—	1768	A stone house with quoins and a stone-slate roof, in two storeys and with a symmetrical three-bay front. The windows are mullioned, and the central doorway has a plain surround.	II
Bawmier; 53.91054°N 2.16399°W	—	Late 18th century	A stone farmhouse with a stone-slate roof and with mullioned windows. The doorway has a porch with Doric columns and a wide lintel.	II
Aqueduct; 53.89913°N 2.17189°W		1794	The aqueduct carries the Leeds and Liverpool Canal over Wanless Beck. It is in stone and consists of a single low round arch. The bridge has curved abutments reinforced by piers.	II
Halter's Bridge (No 150); 53.89438°N 2.17140°W		1794	An accommodation bridge over the Leeds and Liverpool Canal. It is in stone and consists of a single elliptical arch with voussoirs. The bridge has a coped parapet and abutments that end in piers.	II
Salterforth Bridge (No 151); 53.90371°N 2.17254°W		1794	The bridge carries Salterforth Lane over the Leeds and Liverpool Canal. It is in stone and consists of a single elliptical arch with voussoirs. The bridge has a coped parapet and abutments that end in piers.	II
Anchor Inn; 53.90376°N 2.17222°W		Late 18th or early 19th century	A public house in stone with quoins and a stone-slate roof in two storeys. The doorway is in Palladian style, with rusticated jambs, a frieze, a pediment, and a fanlight.	II
