= Granary Wharf =

Area of Leeds city centre, England

Coordinates: 53°47′39″N 1°32′53″W

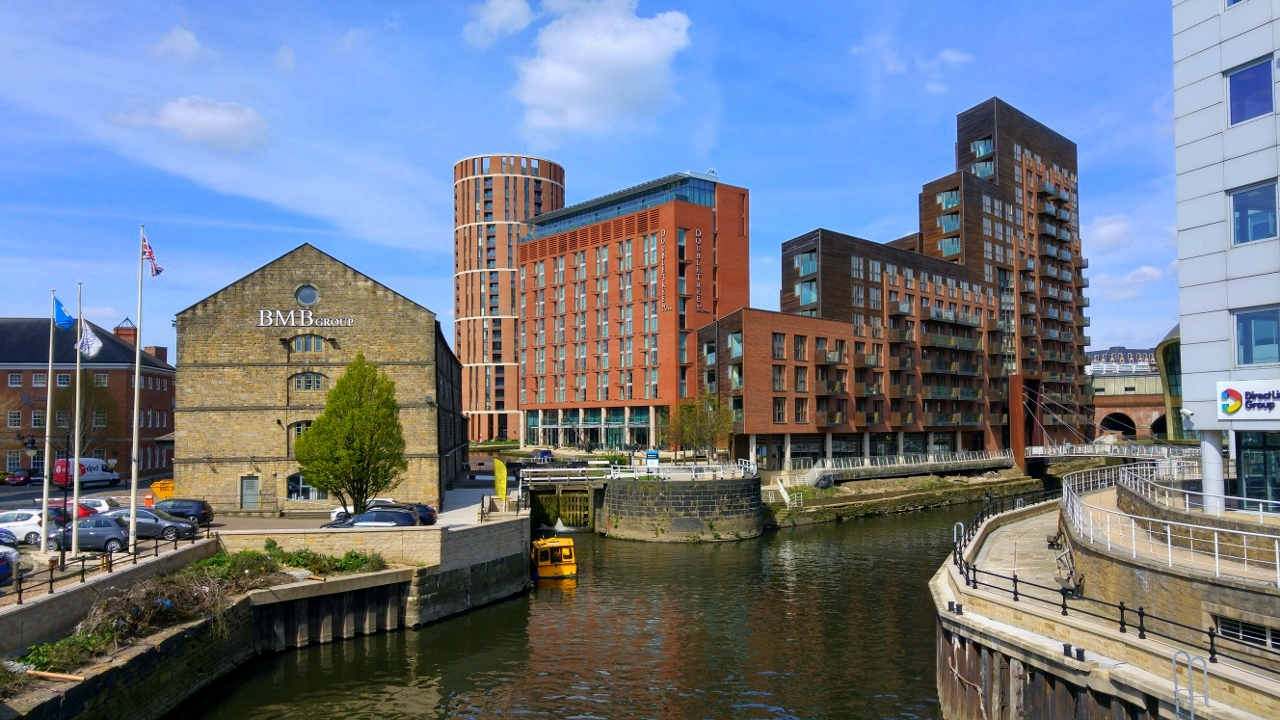

General information
- Status: Completed
- Location: Leeds, England
- Completed: 2009
- Opening: 2009

Height
- Roof: Candle House: 76 m (249 ft); Watermans Place: 50 m (160 ft); DoubleTree: 48 m (157 ft)

Technical details
- Floor count: Candle House: 23; Watermans Place: 17; DoubleTree: 15

Granary Wharf is a mixed-use development that stands next to the brick tunnels beside the Leeds and Liverpool Canal, and the River Aire in Leeds, West Yorkshire, England. Leeds City railway station sits above the brick tunnels on Dark Neville Street. The tunnel complex is known locally as the Dark Arches.

== History ==
In 1864 it was proposed to build a new railway station in Leeds. Construction began in 1866 and the station was completed in 1869. The new station was built on arches which span the River Aire, Neville Street and Swinegate. The building of the station led to the creation of the 'Dark Arches' over Neville Street. Over 18 million bricks were used during their construction, breaking records at the time.

Although the arches appear to be part of one single structure, closer inspection reveals that it is a series of independent viaducts two or four tracks wide. The station is situated next to the terminus of the Leeds and Liverpool Canal, but as the station is raised high above ground level it is possible to gain access to the Dark Arches from the towpath.

Developed in the 1990s and advertised as Leeds' best kept secret, the Granary Wharf shopping centre was situated underneath the Dark Arches. There were several established businesses underneath the arches, these included; restaurants, shops, boutiques, cafes, a bakery, exhibition spaces and a 1,000 capacity events venue. The Arches as a shopping centre was in decline for some time, and has now been developed as a car park.

In 2009 Granary Wharf was redeveloped with a new hotel (the City Inn, now DoubleTree by Hilton) and two apartment blocks: Candle House and Watermans Place. The newly developed Granary Wharf also features several modern restaurants and bars.

Also in 2009, a 100 metre section of Neville Street was reimagined by German artist and composer Hans Peter Kuhn. 'Light' Neville Street was a public art installation commissioned by Leeds City Council that incorporated light and sound. It was decommissioned in 2022 when Leeds railway station was redeveloped.

In 2026, a water taxi link between Granary Wharf and Leeds Dock resumed after a hiatus of four months.

== Gallery ==
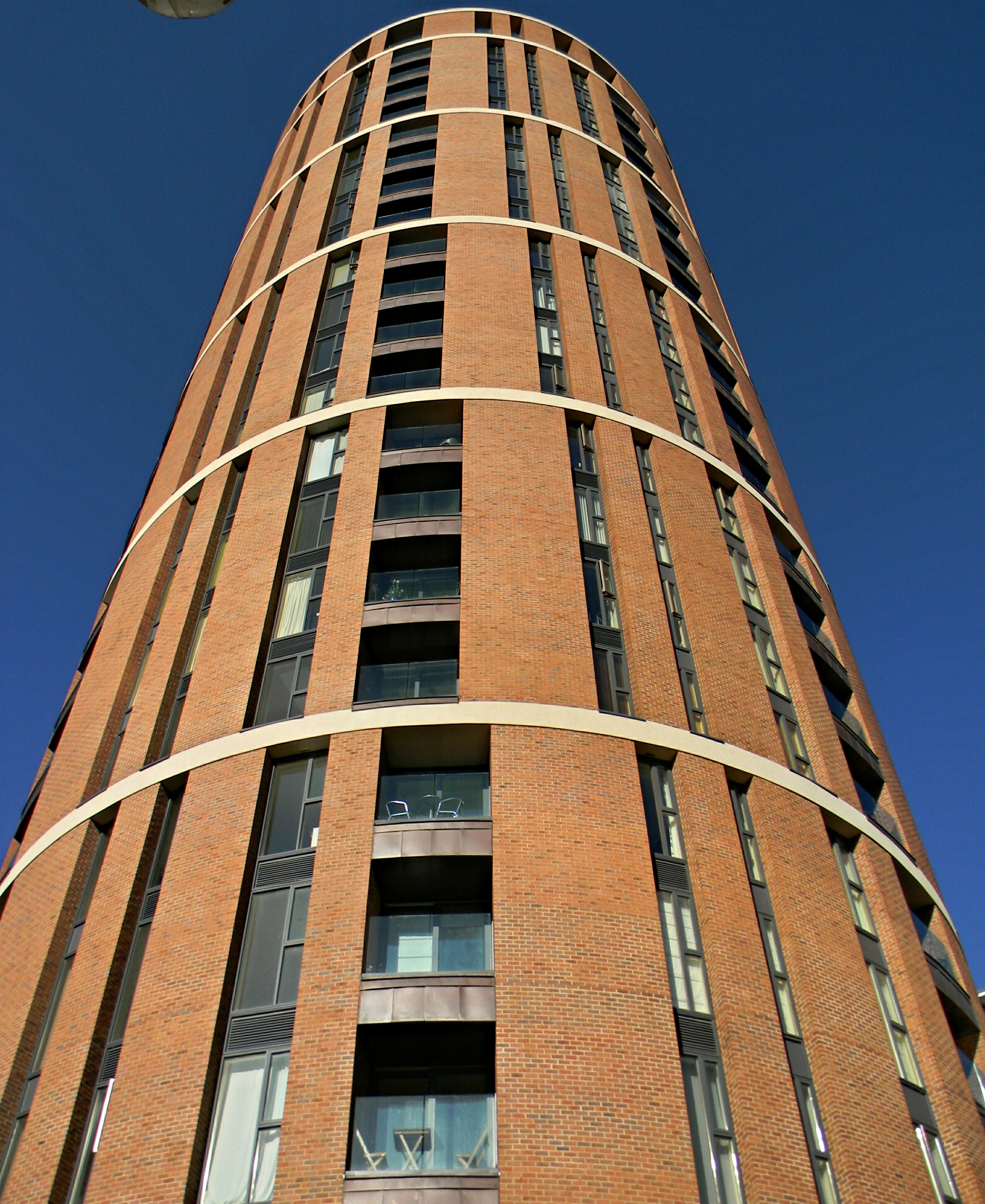
Candle House

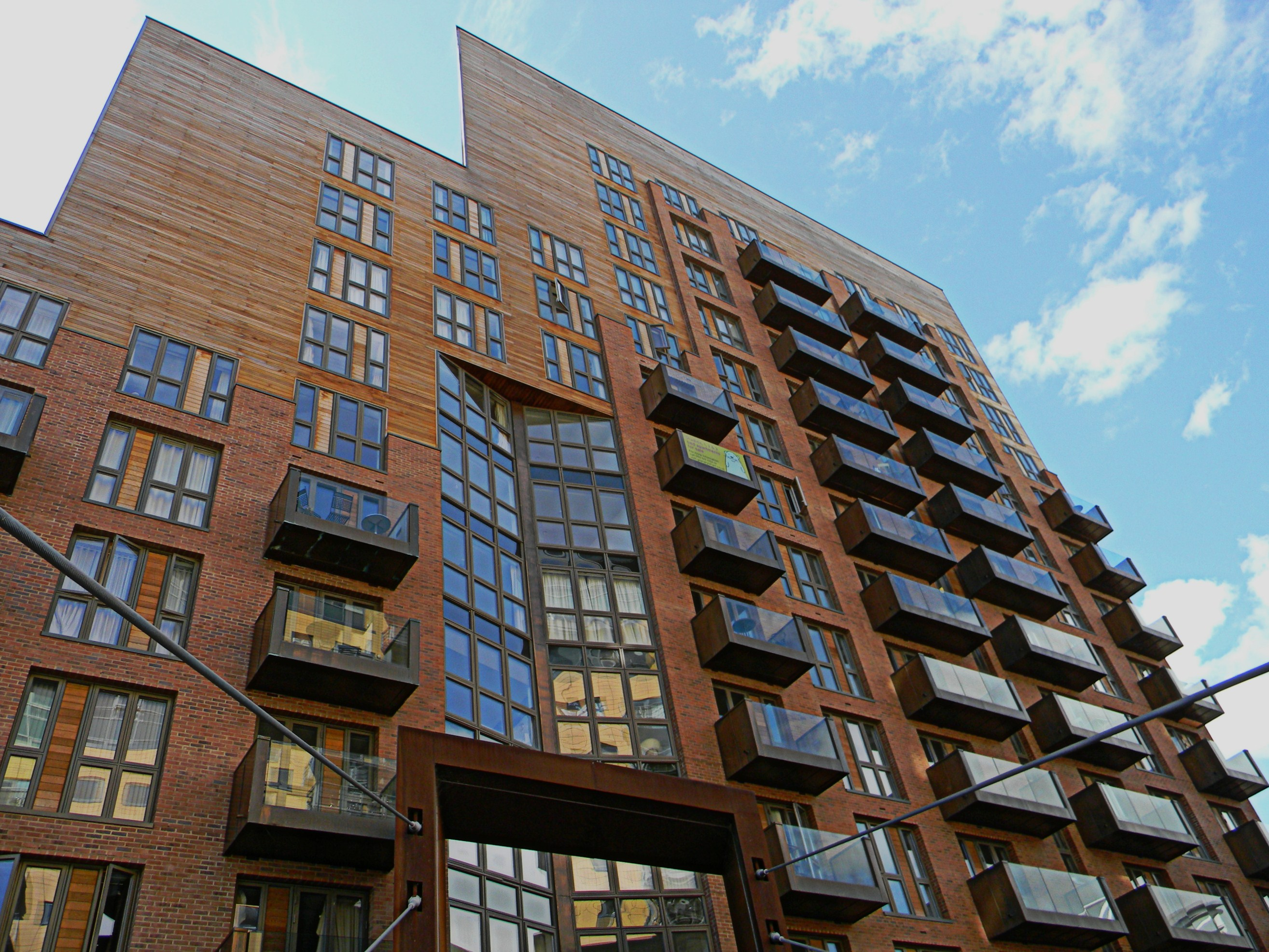
Watermans Place

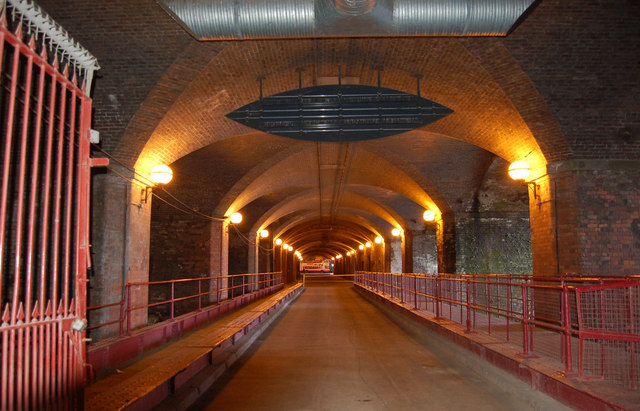
Dark Arches

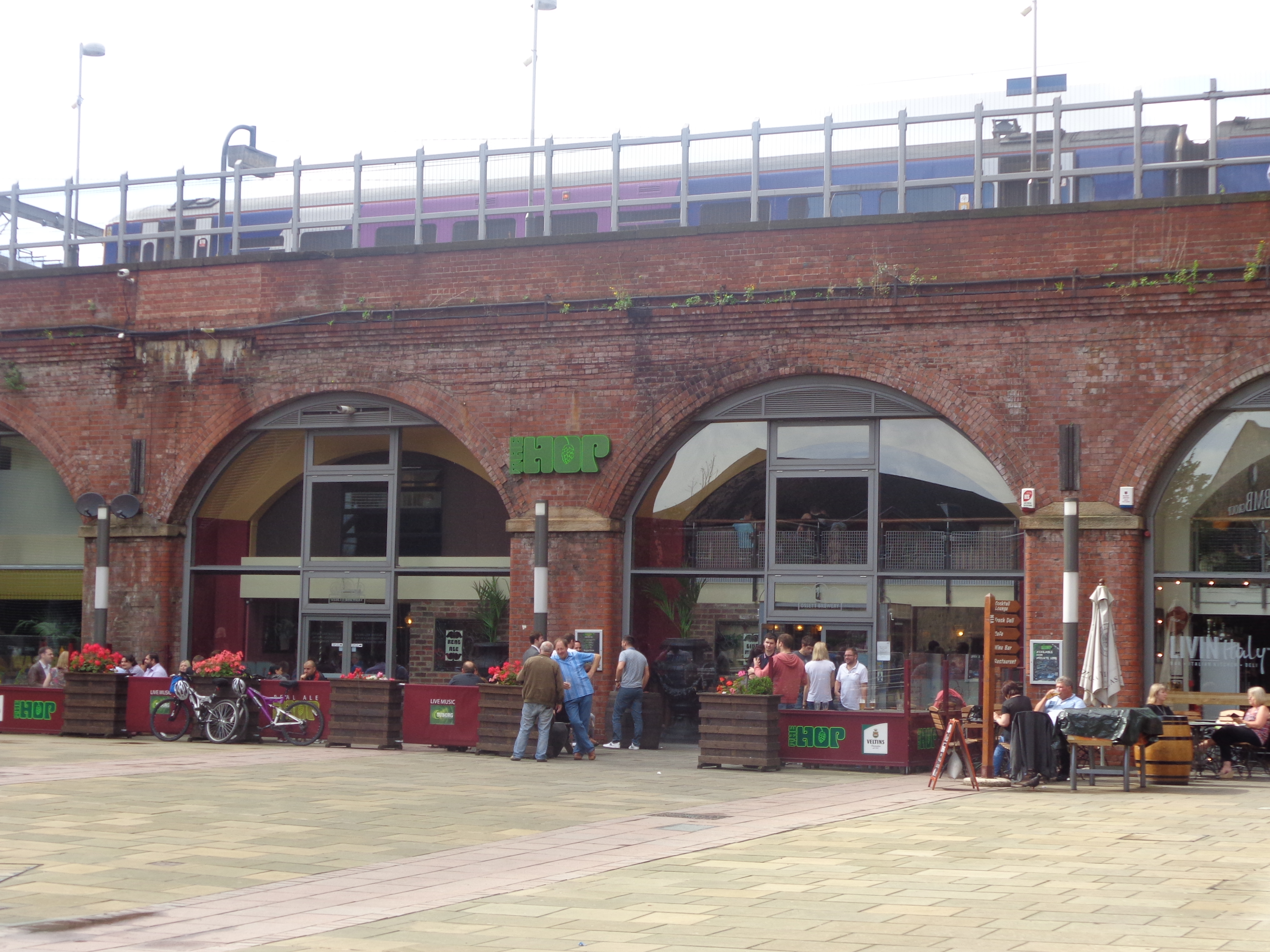
