= West Craven =

Area in the east of Lancashire, England

Coordinates: 53.924°N 2.186°W

West Craven is an area in the east of Lancashire, England in the far northern part of the borough of Pendle. Historically the area was within the ancient county boundaries of Yorkshire and was administered as part of the Skipton Rural District of the West Riding of Yorkshire until 1974.

After 1974 and becoming part of the Pendle borough of Lancashire, the area that was formerly in the larger Craven area of the West Riding of Yorkshire has been known as West Craven owing to its cultural links with Yorkshire.

Towns and villages in West Craven are: Barnoldswick, Earby, Sough, Kelbrook, Salterforth and Bracewell and Brogden. There is a West Craven Area Committee for Parish Councils in the area.

From 1974 until 2023, West Craven was also the name of a ward of the former Craven district in North Yorkshire, adjoining the West Craven area in Lancashire. The ward included the parishes of Broughton, Carleton, Elslack, Martons Both and Thornton in Craven.
