= Foulridge Tunnel =

Canal tunnel in Lancashire

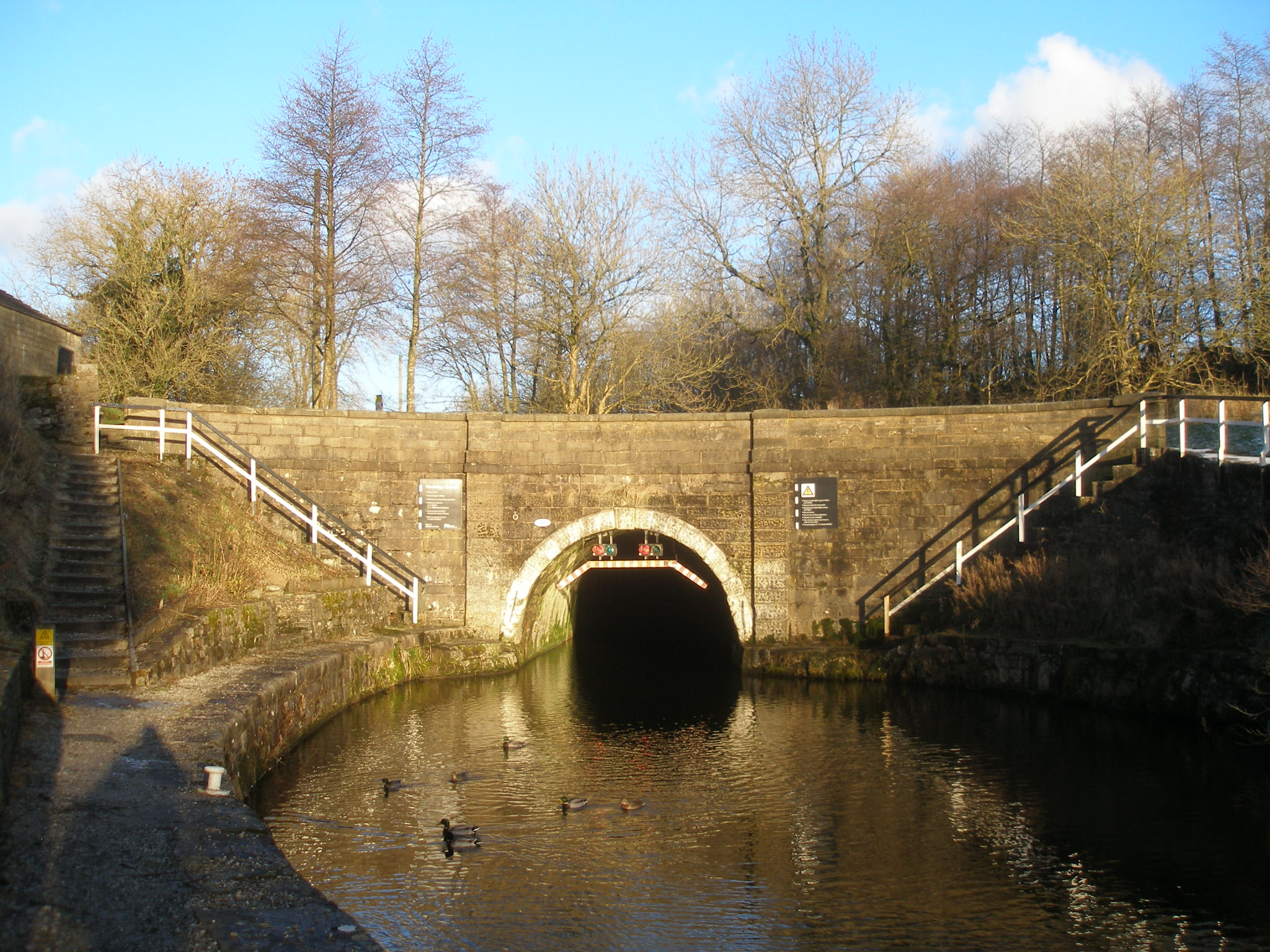
- Southern entrance
- Interactive map of Foulridge Tunnel

Overview
- Location: Foulridge
- Coordinates: 53.8745°N 2.1821°W
- Status: Open
- Waterway: Leeds and Liverpool Canal
- Start: 53.8781°N 2.1726°W
- End: 53.8708°N 2.1916°W

Operation
- Constructed: 1792–1796
- Opened: 3 May 1796; 230 years ago
- Owner: Canal & River Trust

Technical
- Design engineer: Robert Whitworth; Samuel Fletcher
- Length: 1,630 yd (1,490 m)
- Tunnel clearance: 13 ft (4.0 m)
- Width: 17 ft (5.2 m)
- Towpath: No
- Boat-passable: Yes

The Foulridge Tunnel (/ˈfoʊlrɪdʒ/) is a canal tunnel on the Leeds and Liverpool Canal in Foulridge, Lancashire. Also known as the Mile Tunnel, Foulridge is 1,630 yards (1,490 metres) long and was built by Samuel Fletcher, following Robert Whitworth's 1789 survey. The tunnel is the longest in the country to allow passage of canoes and kayaks.

== Background ==
The building of the Leeds and Liverpool Canal began in 1770, but work on the over-budget project was suspended during the American Revolutionary War. Under the original plan, the canal's route would not have required a tunnel at Foulridge, and instead additional locks would have created a 1-mile-long (1.6 km) summit level, thirty feet (nine metres) higher, with the line passing through a reservoir. Before work on the canal resumed with Robert Whitworth as engineer, he re-surveyed the route and recommended changes to improve the available water supply.

== Construction ==
Construction of the tunnel began in December 1792, following Whitworth's 1789 survey. The project lasted almost five years; the final three years saw construction of the final 1,400 yards (1,300 metres) of tunnel.

Only 700 yards (650 metres) of the tunnel's length—approximately two fifths—was built by the standard method of sinking shafts and boring horizontally. The majority of the tunnel was made using the cut and cover method, where the hill was excavated and the tunnel lining constructed before the hill excavation was infilled. This was a result of loose earth in the hillside that was not sufficiently stable to allow tunnelling 69 feet (21 metres) below the hilltop.

Once the tunnel was complete the canal opened to Colne Road in Burnley in 1796, where it would take another five years to complete the large embankment needed to cross the valley there.

== Operational history ==
After the tunnel's opening in May 1796, the Leeds Intelligencer described the tunnel as "the most complete work of the kind in England, if not in Europe".

A local story purports that on 24 September 1912, a cow (Note: Numerous sources give the cow's name as Buttercup, although it is likely this was a nickname coined after the event) fell into the canal at Blue Slate Farm, Colne, near the southern portal. She then swam the length of the tunnel before being helped out and revived with brandy (or rum) at the Hole in the Wall pub in Foulridge.

Having no towpath, vessels traditionally navigated the tunnel by legging while the horses traversed above the tunnel. This practice ended at Foulridge in 1886 after the drowning of a legger; a double-ended steam tug was introduced in 1880 to haul vessels through and return without winding. A diesel tug later replaced the steam boat; this service ended in 1937. To ensure that boats would not meet head-on in the tunnel, a telephone system was installed to control passage. In 1963, this was superseded by traffic lights.

In 2017, the Canal & River Trust allowed unpowered craft such as canoes and kayaks to use the tunnel.

== See also ==
- Listed buildings in Foulridge
- Listed buildings in Colne
