= 'Light and Sound Transit' at Neville Street tunnel =

Urban project in Leeds, England

‘Light’ Neville Street was a £4.6million urban project in Leeds that prioritised sound and light in its engineered 100m long tunnel infrastructure.

Embedded in the specially constructed 100-metre-long thoroughfare, A Light and Sound Transit by the artist Hans Peter Kuhn provided an example of cutting-edge, contemporary public art. It gained national attention as a permanent sculptural work that consisted of sound and computing technologies.

The upgrade of the Neville Street tunnel was a major scheme in the Holbeck Urban Village development, led through a partnership between Leeds City Council, Yorkshire Forward and The Northern Way.

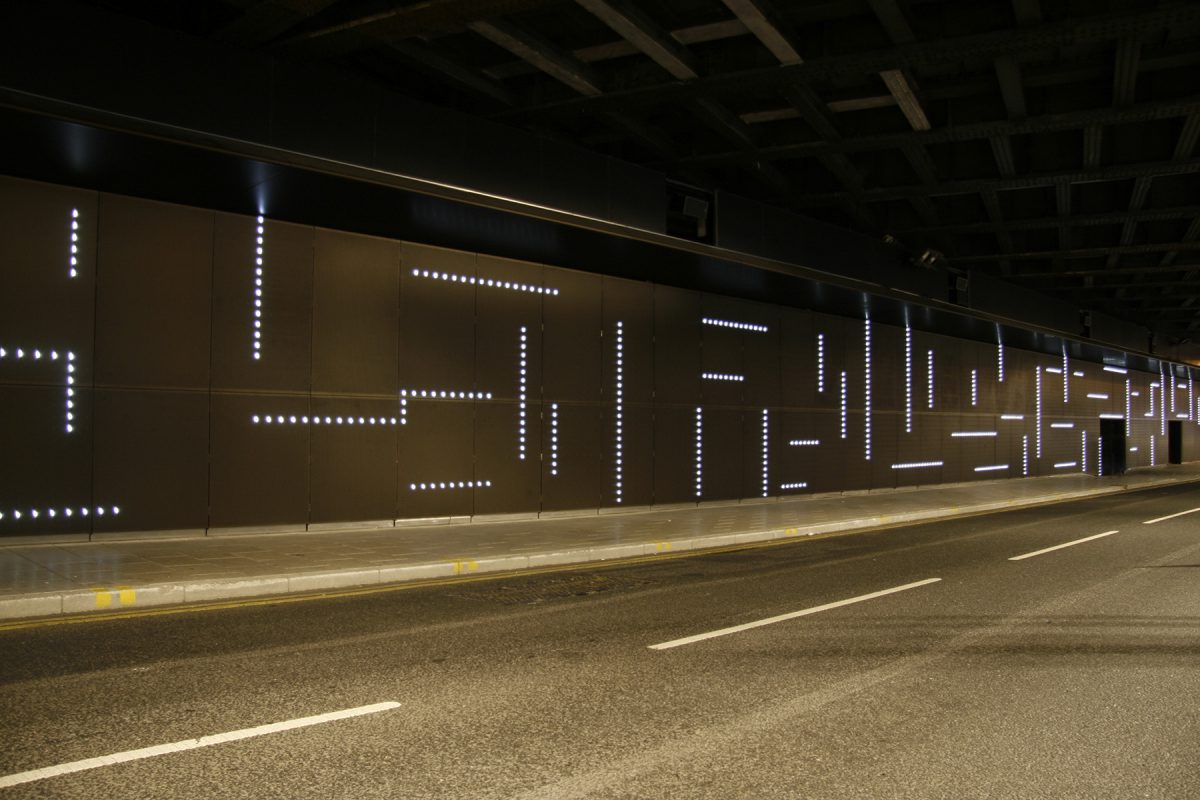
'Light' Neville Street, Leeds launched in 2009, decommissioned in 2023.

The tunnel entrance into the city remains an enclosed site with high levels of pollution. It has been cited as the fourth most polluted street in the UK by Friends of the Earth, exceeding UK safety targets with double the recommended levels of nitrogen dioxide.

== Launch ==
Launched in 2009, the interplay of light and sound transformed the gateway tunnel into an immersive urban landscape for its 13,000 daily users. It sought to improve lighting, reduce traffic noise and alter perceptions about the safety of the tunnel for pedestrians. It was decommissioned due to an extensive redevelopment of Leeds Railway Station in 2023.

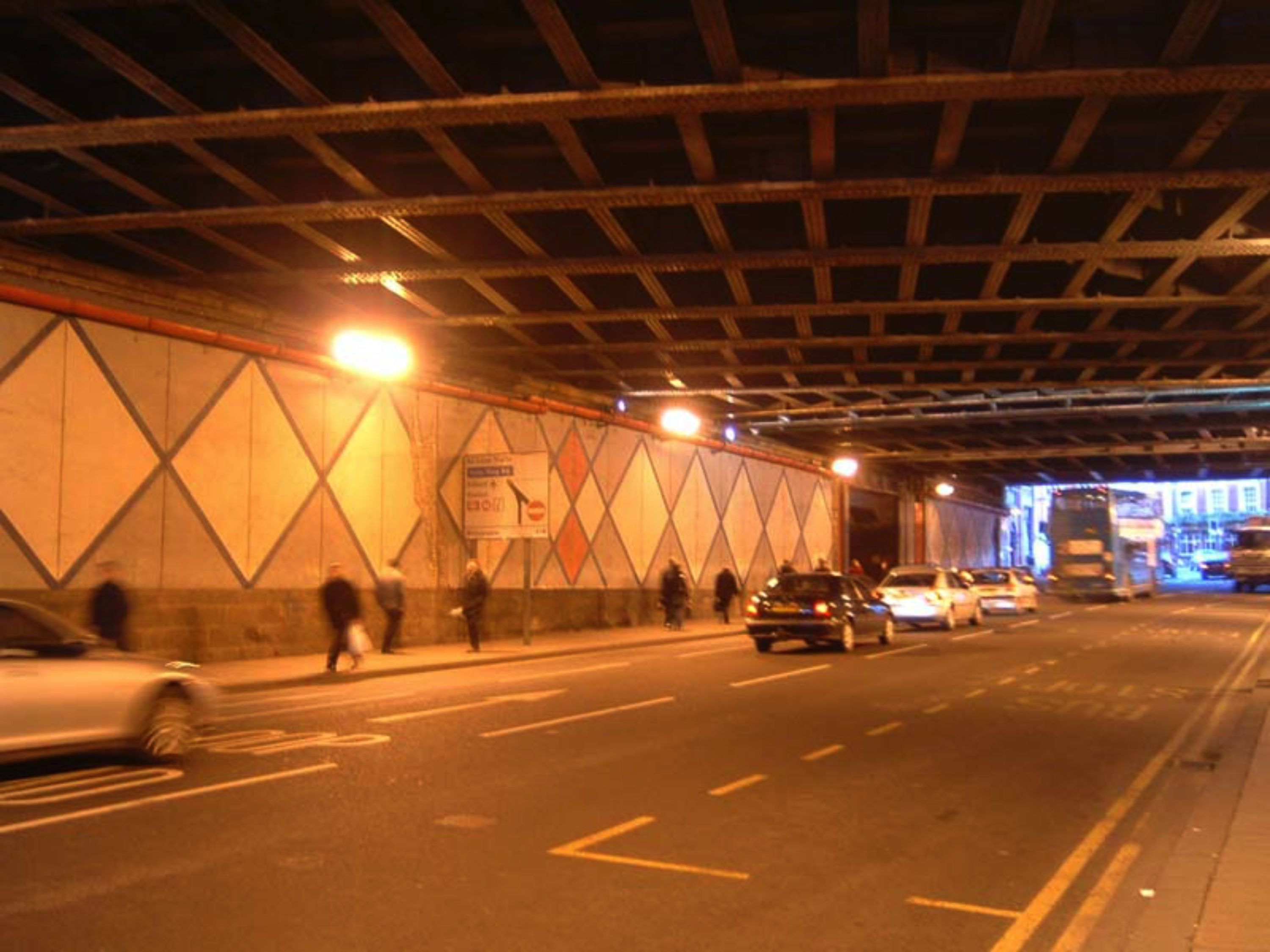
Neville Street prior to 2009

Commissioned within the Holbeck Urban Village development, the upgrade of the tunnel was a policy priority to re-establish the vital tunnel infrastructure to allow for the expansion of the city centre into the south aspects of the city and the neighborhoods of Holbeck and Beeston.

The Neville Street scheme incorporated physical improvements to the infrastructure of the tunnel that included noise dampening panels, extending the pavements, bus stop relocation and the reduction of traffic lanes from four to three.

Bauman Lyons Architects led a team of Arup specialists including engineers and acousticians, Leeds company LiteLED, public art agency MAAP with Leeds City Council project management. Artists were brought into the design team at a very early stage of concept development.

Berlin based artist Hans Peter Kuhn created A Light and Sound Transit as grids of LED lights that changed once per day and a subtle sound composition that balanced the noise from inside the tunnel. Leeds-based graphic artist Andy Edwards’ ‘Counterflow’, used a moiré optical effect to increase drivers' speed awareness on entering the city to slow down traffic movement.

The design created a practical pairing of art and science by using sound, light, architecture and engineering technologies, and balanced the need for a functional and durable installation with the desire for an aesthetically pleasing and impressive artwork.

== Policy ==
Investment of £2 million was provided by Leeds City Council with £1.95mill from Yorkshire Forward and Northern Way contributing £646,000. Onsite works began in June 2009 and the scheme launched in November 2009.

Highly engineered panels of graffiti resistant aluminium housed a sound-absorbent material (Quietstone) to reduce the noise level. To improve lighting and passive security, a high-performance Meyer PA speaker system with 24 speakers arranged in pairs was mounted on the overhead canopy with computer hardware for Kuhn's sound artwork. 3,200 embedded LEDs as part of 28,500 acrylic 'stalks' embedded in the perforated wall panels for the East Wall, arranged in gridlines, changed pattern each day.

Works had to be temporarily halted as the lead contractor Wrekin went into administration with the Scunthorpe firm Saferoad BLG taking on the role as a previous sub-contractor.

Councillor Andrew Carter, leader of Leeds City Council ‘Neville Street should mark the point of entry into a world-class city and remind the UK’s business sector that we are a business-ready city’.

== Welcome to the North ==
Public art was part of UK National Government policy to re-balance the North/South economic divide through an investment programme called ‘Welcome to the North’. A Light and Sound Transit was selected as one of six iconic public sculptures, launched between 2007 and 2010, alongside Antony Gormley’s Another Place, Crosby Beach and Richard Wilson’s Turning the Place Over. The artworks received investment from a £100m growth initiative led by the Labour Government who recognised the potential of public art as a cultural catalyst.

In the case of the Leeds project, £646,000 funded the artist’s fees, PA speaker system, a major interpretation and education programme, and public messaging and marketing.

== Public engagement and exhibitions ==
=== Klanging Banging ===
A training programme for 'Light' Neville Street, entitled Klanging Banging, provided 12- month bursaries for emergent sound artists. Four students from Leeds universities with specialisms in composition, music technology and fine art were selected and created new pieces of sound art for Neville Street and Holbeck Urban Village. Junction by Stuart Childs and Chris Martin, located on the Granary Wharf canal side, was a sonic re-telling of the industrial past of the area to the evolution of digital and knowledge industries. Tom Cookson’s piece Urban Birdsong drew parallels between the sounds of city, traffic and nature from specially created birdbox in the trees at the entrance to Neville Street. The programme was produced by MAAP in partnership with Lumen Arts.

=== Sonic Postcards ===
An educational project exploring experimental sound with pupils and teachers from four Leeds schools in partnership with Sonic Arts Network.

=== Licht auf Licht (Light on Light) ===
Hans Peter Kuhn projects, photography by Gerhard Kassner 13 September- 8 November 2008, Project Space Leeds. Kassner’s large scale images depict Hans Peter Kuhn’s international portfolio of public projects which transform urban landscapes and industrial architecture using light and sound.

== Decommissioning ==
The project was decommissioned due to an extensive redevelopment of Leeds Railway Station in 2023.

== Archiving ==
The ‘Light’ Neville Street collection of documents is now held in the Henry Moore Institute's Archive of Sculptors’ Papers partnership with Leeds Museums and Galleries. The archive includes a 360 degree movie of the Neville Street tunnel with the artists' light and sound works viewable on a VR headset.
