= Noyna Hill =

Hill in Lancashire, England

- Noyna Rocks
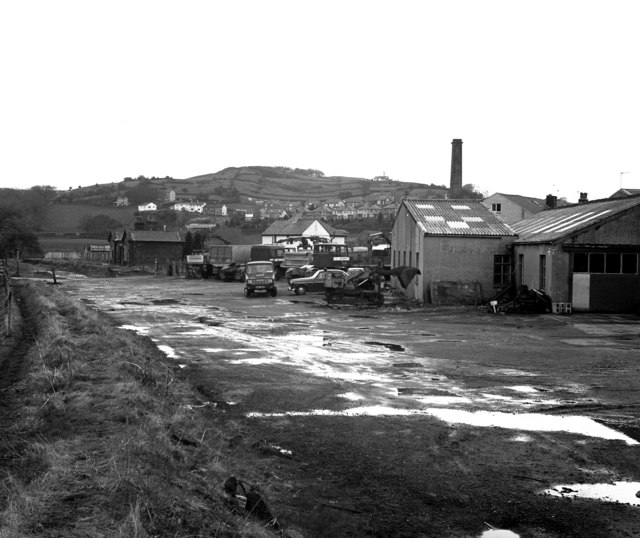
- Noyna Hill seen from Foulridge

Highest point
- Elevation: 299 m (981 ft)
- Parent peak: Boulsworth Hill
- Coordinates: 53.879°N 2.150°W

Geography
- Location within Lancashire Location within the Borough of Pendle
- Location: Foulridge, Lancashire, England
- OS grid: SD901425
- Topo map: OS Landranger 103

Noyna Hill (sometimes called Noyna or Noyna Rock/s) is a hill in the Pennine range in Pendle, Lancashire, England.

It is a mile east of Foulridge and it is possible to see other local towns such as Colne, Nelson, Trawden, Barnoldswick and Earby. On a clear day most of Lancashire and the Yorkshire Dales are visible from here. There are traces of Iron Age walling at the foot of the hill.

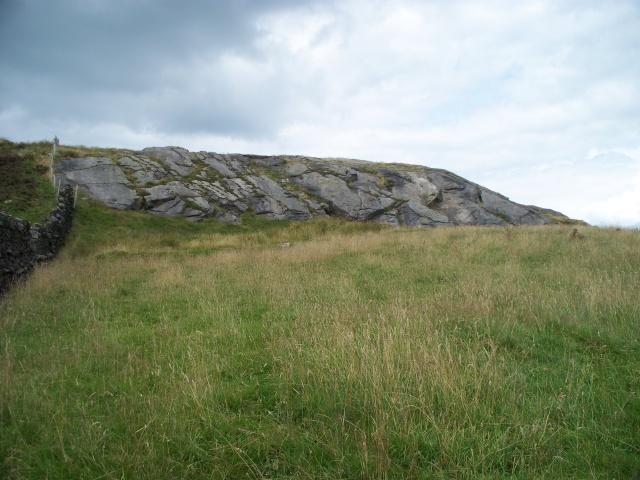
Noyna Rocks, a rocky outcrop on Noyna Hill

Although the prominence is not that great because of the close proximity of other hills, it is well known in the area for its distinctive, wide, but not particularly high, rocky outcrop. The summit of the hill is approximately 300 metres (980 ft) above sea level.

The hill is on farmland, but public footpaths allow access.
