= Kelbrook =

Village in Lancashire, England

Coordinates: 53.898°N 2.149°W

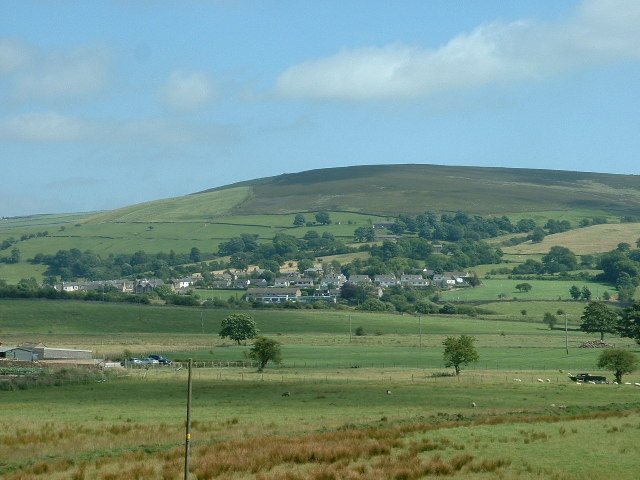
- A view towards Kelbrook

- Location in Pendle Borough Location within Lancashire
- OS grid reference: SD902447
- Civil parish: Kelbrook and Sough
- District: Pendle
- Shire county: Lancashire
- Region: North West
- Country: England
- Sovereign state: United Kingdom
- Post town: BARNOLDSWICK
- Postcode district: BB18
- Dialling code: 01282
- Police: Lancashire
- Fire: Lancashire
- Ambulance: North West
- UK Parliament: Pendle and Clitheroe

Kelbrook is a village in the civil parish of Kelbrook and Sough, Borough of Pendle, in Lancashire, England. It lies on the A56 road between Colne and Earby.

Historically a part of the now divided old parish of Thornton-in-Craven in the West Riding of Yorkshire, Kelbrook was administered as part of Skipton Rural District, until boundary changes in 1974. Kelbrook lies in West Craven, so keeping cultural links with Yorkshire and Craven.

Kelbrook School is in the centre of the village. The tallest building in the village is the village church, St Mary's. Other local towns and villages are Barnoldswick (2 miles/3.2 km northwest), Earby (1 mile/1.6 km north), Salterforth (1 mile/1.6 km northwest), Thornton in Craven (2 miles/3.2 km north), Foulridge (2 miles/3.2 km south) and Colne (3.5 miles/5.6 km south).

Elisabeth Beresford, the creator of the Wombles, wrote much of the second Wombles book, The Wandering Wombles, whilst staying in a cottage on Dotcliffe Road in 1970. The Kelbrook and Sough Wombles, a local litter-picking group, is named in tribute to this connection. Edward Woodward lived in Kelbrook for six weeks in 1973 whilst preparing for his role in The Wicker Man.

The residents of Kelbrook are affectionately called Kelbricks.

During a wedding it is tradition for young residents of the village to lock the church gates and demand money from the bride and groom. A more recent custom is to make scarecrows of literary characters from children's books and to race ducks on Kelbrook Beck.

== Tourism ==
The main A56 road runs through the village. Kelbrook has one public house named the Craven Heifer, named after a local cow, the eponymous Craven Heifer, which was born in 1807 and achieved nationwide fame because of its size. The public house was previously named the Scotsmans Arms, and changed name between 1853 and 1891.

Other attractions include the Kelbrook Pottery factory and the annual art exhibition. The village also has a petrol station with a shop.

== See also ==
Listed buildings in Kelbrook and Sough
