= Foulridge =

Village in Lancashire, England

Coordinates: 53.876°N 2.168°W

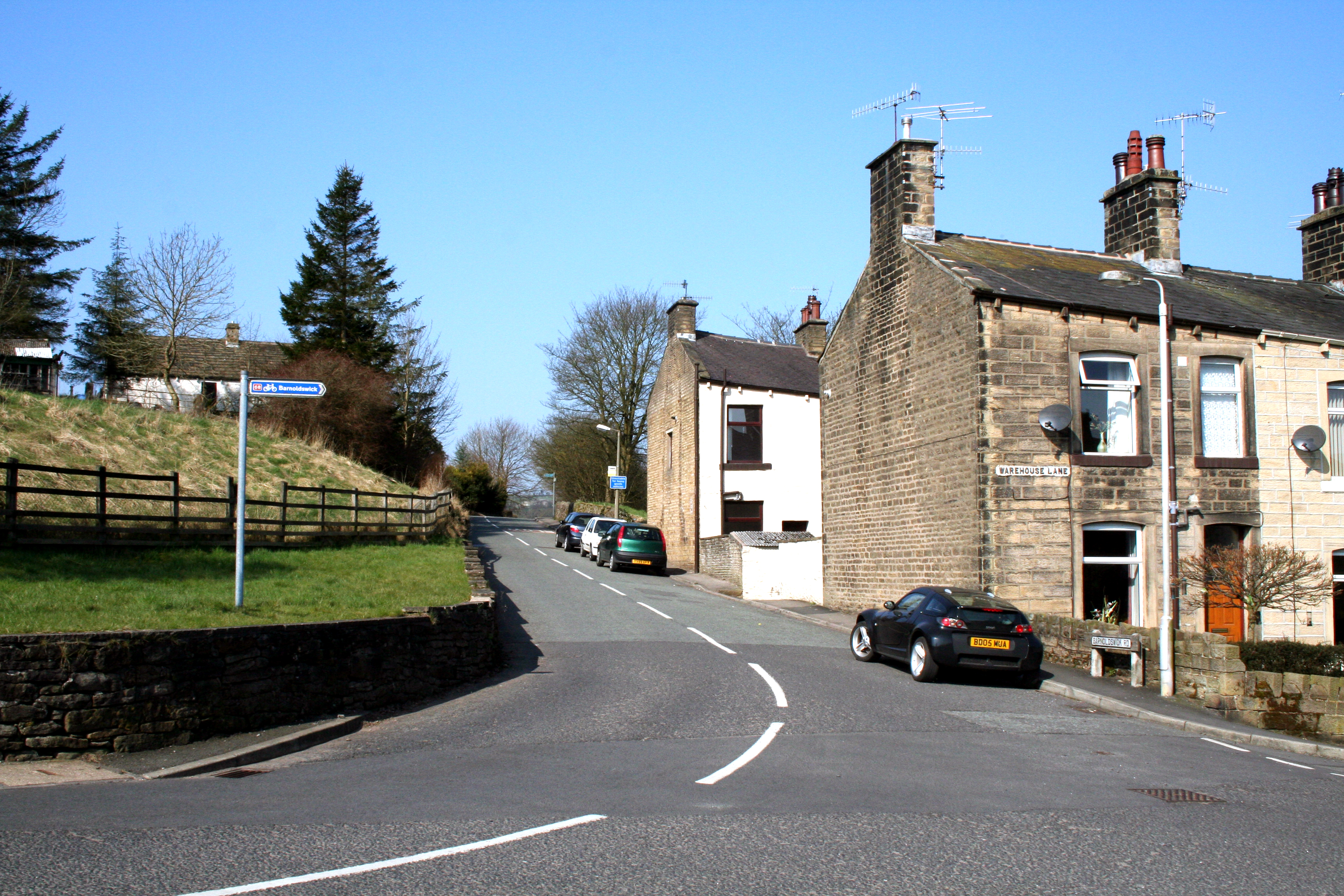
- Barnoldswick Road

- Location in Pendle Borough Location within Lancashire
- Population: 1,503 (2011)
- OS grid reference: SD889422
- Civil parish: Foulridge
- District: Pendle
- Shire county: Lancashire
- Region: North West
- Country: England
- Sovereign state: United Kingdom
- Post town: COLNE
- Postcode district: BB8
- Dialling code: 01282
- Police: Lancashire
- Fire: Lancashire
- Ambulance: North West
- UK Parliament: Pendle

Foulridge (pronounced /ˈfoʊlrɪdʒ/ FOHL-rij) is a village and civil parish in Pendle, Lancashire, close to the border with North Yorkshire in England. It is situated just beyond Colne, on the route from the M65 to Skipton, and is an important stopping point on summit pound of the Leeds and Liverpool Canal, just before it enters the Foulridge Tunnel. Noyna Hill, a well known local landmark, sits 1 mile (1.6 km) east of the village.

Foulridge adjoins the Pendle parishes of Salterforth, Kelbrook and Sough, Laneshaw Bridge, Colne and Blacko.

Foulridge was once a township in the ancient parish of Whalley. This became a civil parish in 1866, forming part of the Burnley Rural District from 1894 (until 1974). A detached area of the old township to the east around Barnside and Monkhall, moved to Colne in 1935.

An old tale is of a cow falling into the canal at one end then passing through the tunnel before rescue. It is said it was taken to the nearby pub and revived with a drink. There is also a large reservoir that feeds the canal. Barge trips are also available on the canal.

Foulridge has been part of Lancashire since the Middle Ages and was about 1.5 miles (2.4 km) from the boundary of the old West Riding of Yorkshire. With the creation of the Borough of Pendle in 1974 parts of Yorkshire, including Earby and Barnoldswick, were transferred to Lancashire, and Foulridge moved further away from the White Rose county. There is an old village sign which used to mark the boundary with Yorkshire which has been affixed to the village hall in the centre of Foulridge. There is a large reservoir in the village which feeds the canal and which in turn is fed from other smaller reservoirs around the village.

Foulridge also had its own railway station, which closed in 1959.

According to the United Kingdom Census 2011, the parish has a population of 1,503, a decrease from 1,506 in the 2001 census.

== See also ==
- Listed buildings in Foulridge
