= Listed buildings in Kelbrook and Sough =

Kelbrook and Sough is a civil parish in Pendle, Lancashire, England. It contains eight listed buildings that are recorded in the National Heritage List for England. All of the listed buildings are designated at Grade II, the lowest of the three grades, which is applied to "buildings of national importance and special interest". The parish contains the village of Kelbrook and the hamlet of Sough, and is otherwise rural. Most of the listed buildings are houses and farmhouses, the others being a milestone and a war memorial,

== Buildings ==
Name and location	Photograph	Date	Notes
Middle Hague Farmhouse and Cottage; 53.89039°N 2.15553°W		1618	Originally one house, later a house and cottage. Most of the windows are mullioned. On the right return is a single-storey gabled porch with a moulded square-headed doorway, above which is an inscribed tablet.
Great Hague Farmhouse; 53.88791°N 2.16045°W		17th century	A stone house with a stone-slate roof in two storeys. The windows are mullioned and transomed, and have moulded and returned dripstones. At the rear are two chamfered doorways and a stair window.
Lancashire Gill; 53.88696°N 2.15470°W	—	1677	The house is in stone with a stone-slate roof. All the windows are mullioned but all but one have been altered, On the front is a doorway with a plain surround, and at the rear is a doorway with a lintel inscribed with the date.
Milestone; 53.90693°N 2.14927°W	—	17th or early 18th century	The milestone has been moved from its original position to the Sough Memorial Gardens. It is about 2 feet (0.61 m) high, and carries an inscription in relief.
Stoops Farmhouse and barn 53.89508°N 2.15063°W		18th century	The house and barn are in stone with a stone-slate roof. The house has two storeys, and windows from which the mullions have been removed. The former central doorway has been blocked. The barn to the left, converted for domestic use, has two doorways with chamfered arched lintels, one of which has been converted into a window.
12 High Fold; 53.89806°N 2.14783°W		1764	A stone house with a stone-slate roof in two storeys. The windows are mullioned and there is a central doorway. A moulded panel is inscribed with initials and the date. To the left is a modern extension.
1–7 Yellow Hall; 53.89513°N 2.15009°W		Early 19th century (probable)	A row of four stone houses with a stone-slate roof, in two storeys with a symmetrical front. The doorways of nos. 3 and 5 share a gabled porch. The windows are mullioned and have dripstones. There are finials on the gables.
War memorial 53.90691°N 2.14899°W		1922	The war memorial, designed by W. A. Quarmby, is in Sough Park. It consists of an ornate cenotaph in white Portland stone with bronze plaques. Additions commemorating the Second World War are in sandstone with bronze plaques. The cenotaph stands on two octagonal bases, the lower base having steps and low flanking walls. On top of the cenotaph are carved rolls, lions' heads, and an interpretation of the eternal flame.
