= Salterforth =

Village in Lancashire, England

Coordinates: 53.905°N 2.170°W

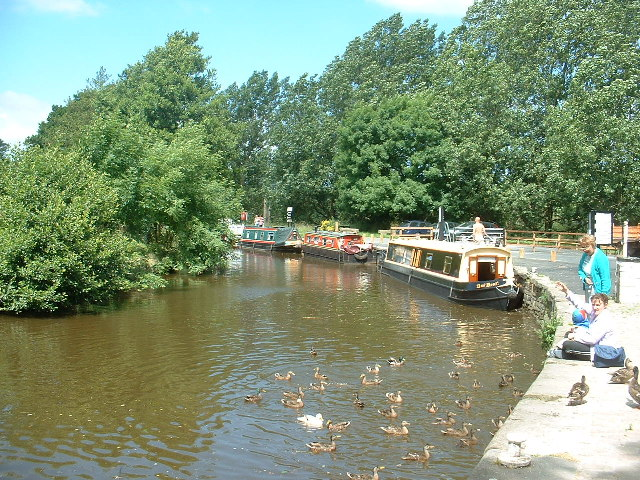
- The Leeds and Liverpool Canal

- Location in Pendle Borough Location within Lancashire
- Population: 637 (2011)
- OS grid reference: SD888454
- Civil parish: Salterforth
- District: Pendle
- Shire county: Lancashire
- Region: North West
- Country: England
- Sovereign state: United Kingdom
- Post town: BARNOLDSWICK
- Postcode district: BB18
- Dialling code: 01282
- Police: Lancashire
- Fire: Lancashire
- Ambulance: North West
- UK Parliament: Pendle and Clitheroe

Salterforth is a village and civil parish within the Borough of Pendle in Lancashire, England. The population of the Civil Parish at the 2011 census was 637. It lies on the B6383 road that connects Barnoldswick to the A56 road at Kelbrook. The Leeds and Liverpool Canal cuts through the village and there are several narrowboat moorings at Salterforth. The canal footpath provides a picturesque walk to Barnoldswick or to Foulridge in the opposite direction. The village also has a canal side pub, The Anchor Inn along with a lovely children's play area.

Historically a part of the West Riding of Yorkshire, Salterforth used to be within Skipton Rural District until 1974. Some of the local area is referred to as West Craven alluding to Salterforth's cultural links to the Craven area of North Yorkshire.

Other local towns and villages are; Barnoldswick - 1 mile (1.6 km) north west, Kelbrook - 2 miles (3.2 km) east, Earby - 2 miles (3.2 km) north east, Thornton in Craven 3 miles (4.8 km) north east, Foulridge - 2 miles (3.2 km) south and Colne 3.5 miles (5.6 km) south.

== See also ==
- Listed buildings in Salterforth
