= Leeds and Liverpool Canal =

Canal in the north of England

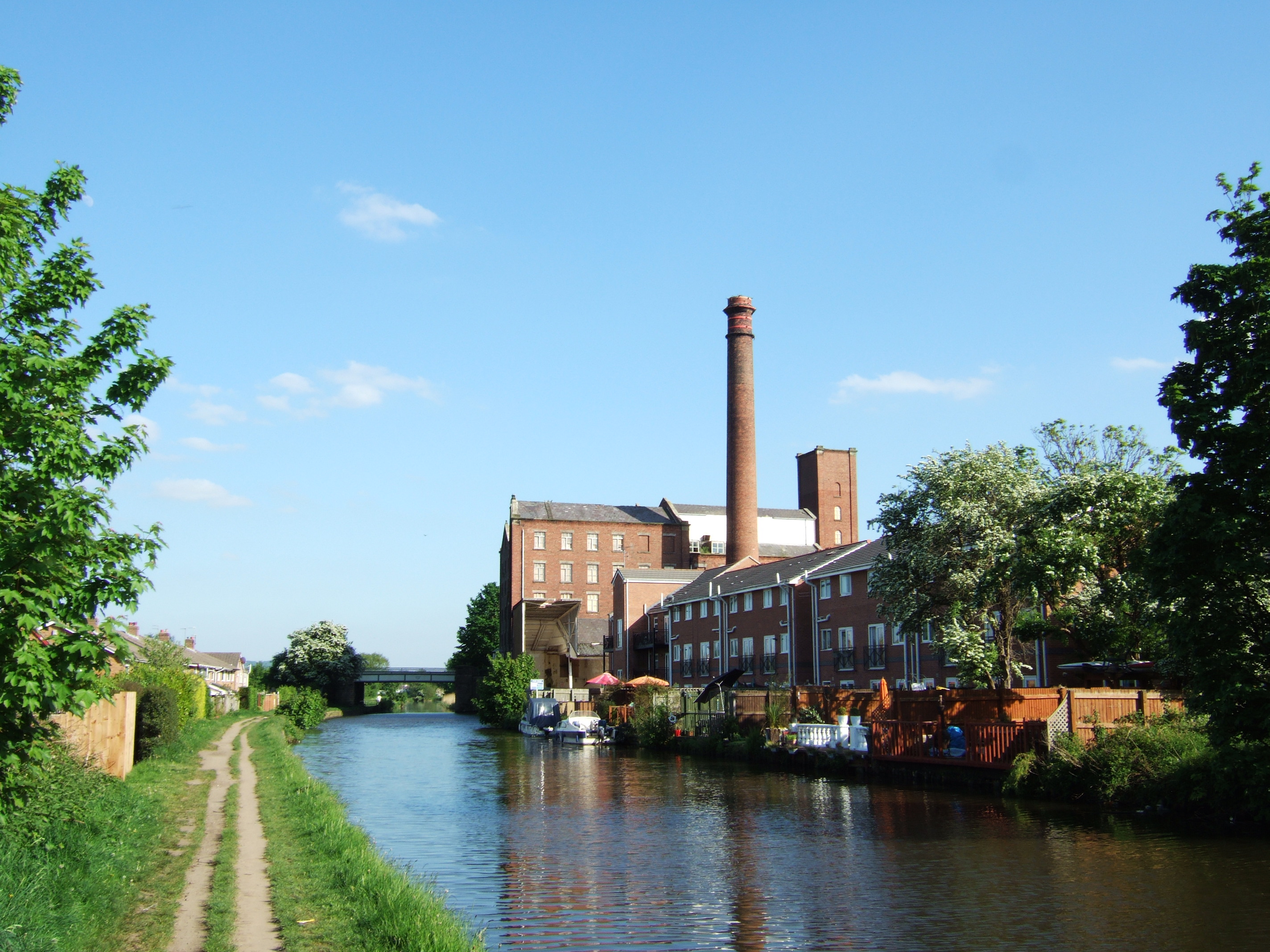
- Ainscoughs mill in Burscough
- Interactive map of Leeds and Liverpool Canal

Specifications
- Maximum boat length: 62 ft 0 in (18.90 m) (A 62' boat can traverse the whole canal; craft up to 72' formerly worked between Liverpool and Leigh.)
- Maximum boat beam: 14 ft 4 in (4.37 m) (Boats with a beam of 14' 4" can traverse the whole canal; craft with a beam up to 14' 6" formerly worked between Liverpool and Leigh.)
- Locks: 91
- Maximum height AMSL: 487 ft (148 m)
- Status: Open
- Navigation authority: Canal & River Trust

History
- Principal engineer: John Longbotham
- Other engineers: James Brindley; Robert Whitworth
- Date of act: 1770
- Construction began: 1770
- Date of first use: 1774
- Date completed: 1816
- Date extended: 1822

Geography
- Start point: 53°47′34″N 1°32′53″W
- End point: 53°24′11″N 2°59′34″W

The Leeds and Liverpool Canal is a canal in Northern England, linking the cities of Leeds and Liverpool.

Over a distance of 127 miles (204 km), crossing the Pennines, and including 91 locks on the main line. The Leeds and Liverpool Canal has several small branches, and in the early 21st century a new link was constructed into the Liverpool docks system.

== History ==
=== Background ===
In the mid-18th century the growing towns of Yorkshire, including Leeds, Wakefield and Bradford, were trading increasingly. While the Aire and Calder Navigation improved links to the east for Leeds, links to the west were limited. Bradford merchants wanted to increase the supply of limestone to make lime for mortar and agriculture using coal from Bradford's collieries and to transport textiles to the Port of Liverpool. On the west coast, traders in the busy port of Liverpool wanted a cheap supply of coal for their shipping and manufacturing businesses and to tap the output from the industrial regions of Lancashire. Inspired by the effectiveness of the wholly artificial navigation, the Bridgewater Canal opened in 1759–60. A canal across the Pennines linking Liverpool and Hull (by means of the Aire and Calder Navigation) would have obvious trade benefits.

A public meeting took place at the Sun Inn in Bradford on 2 July 1766 to promote the building of such a canal. John Longbotham was engaged to survey a route. Two groups were set up to promote the scheme, one in Liverpool and one in Bradford. The Liverpool committee was unhappy with the route originally proposed, following the Ribble valley through Preston, considering that it ran too far to the north, missing key towns and the Wigan coalfield. A counter-proposal was produced by John Eyes and Richard Melling, improved by P.P. Burdett, which was rejected by the Bradford committee as too expensive, mainly because of the valley crossing at Burnley. James Brindley was called in to arbitrate, and ruled in favour of Longbotham's more northerly route, though with a branch towards Wigan, a decision which caused some of the Lancashire backers to withdraw their support, and which was subsequently amended over the course of development. In 1768 Brindley gave a detailed estimate of a distance just less than 109 miles (175 km) built at a cost of £259,777 (equivalent to about £32.67 million as of 2014).

Leeds and Liverpool Canal Act 1770
- Act of Parliament
- Parliament of Great Britain
- Long title: An Act for making and maintaining a navigable Cut or Canal from Leeds Bridge, in the County of York, to The North Lady's Walk in Liverpool, in the County Palatine of Lancaster; and from thence to the River Mersey.
- Citation: 10 Geo. 3. c. 114
- Territorial extent: Great Britain

Dates
- Royal assent: 19 May 1770
- Commencement: 9 January 1770 (Note: Start of session.)
Other legislation
Amended by	Leeds and Liverpool Canal Act 1783; Leeds and Liverpool Canal Branch and Railway Act 1819; Leeds and Liverpool Canal Act 1891
Relates to	Leeds and Liverpool Canal Act 1790; Leeds and Liverpool Canal Act 1794

Status: Amended

Text of statute as originally enacted

The Leeds and Liverpool Canal Act 1770 (10 Geo. 3. c. 114) was passed in May 1770 authorising construction, and Brindley was appointed chief engineer and John Longbotham clerk of works; following Brindley's death in 1772, Longbotham carried out both roles.

=== Construction ===
==== First phase ====
Leeds and Liverpool Canal Act 1783
- Act of Parliament
- Parliament of Great Britain
- Long title: An Act for altering and varying the Powers of an Act, passed in the Sixth Year of the Reign of King George the First,[q] for making the River Douglas, alias Asland, navigable from the River Ribble to Wigan, in the County Palatine of Lancaster; and for enabling the Company of Proprietors of the Leeds and Liverpool Canal, incorporated by an Act passed in the Tenth Year of His present Majesty's Reign, to purchase the said River Navigation; for amending the said last mentioned Act; for incorporating and consolidating the said Two Navigations; and for other Purposes.
- Citation: 23 Geo. 3. c. 47
- Territorial extent: Great Britain

Dates
- Royal assent: 24 June 1783
- Commencement: 5 December 1782
Other legislation
Amends	Leeds and Liverpool Canal Act 1770
Amended by	Leeds and Liverpool Canal Act 1790; Leeds and Liverpool Canal Branch and Railway Act 1819
Relates to	Leeds and Liverpool Canal Act 1790; Leeds and Liverpool Canal Act 1794

Status: Amended

Text of statute as originally enacted

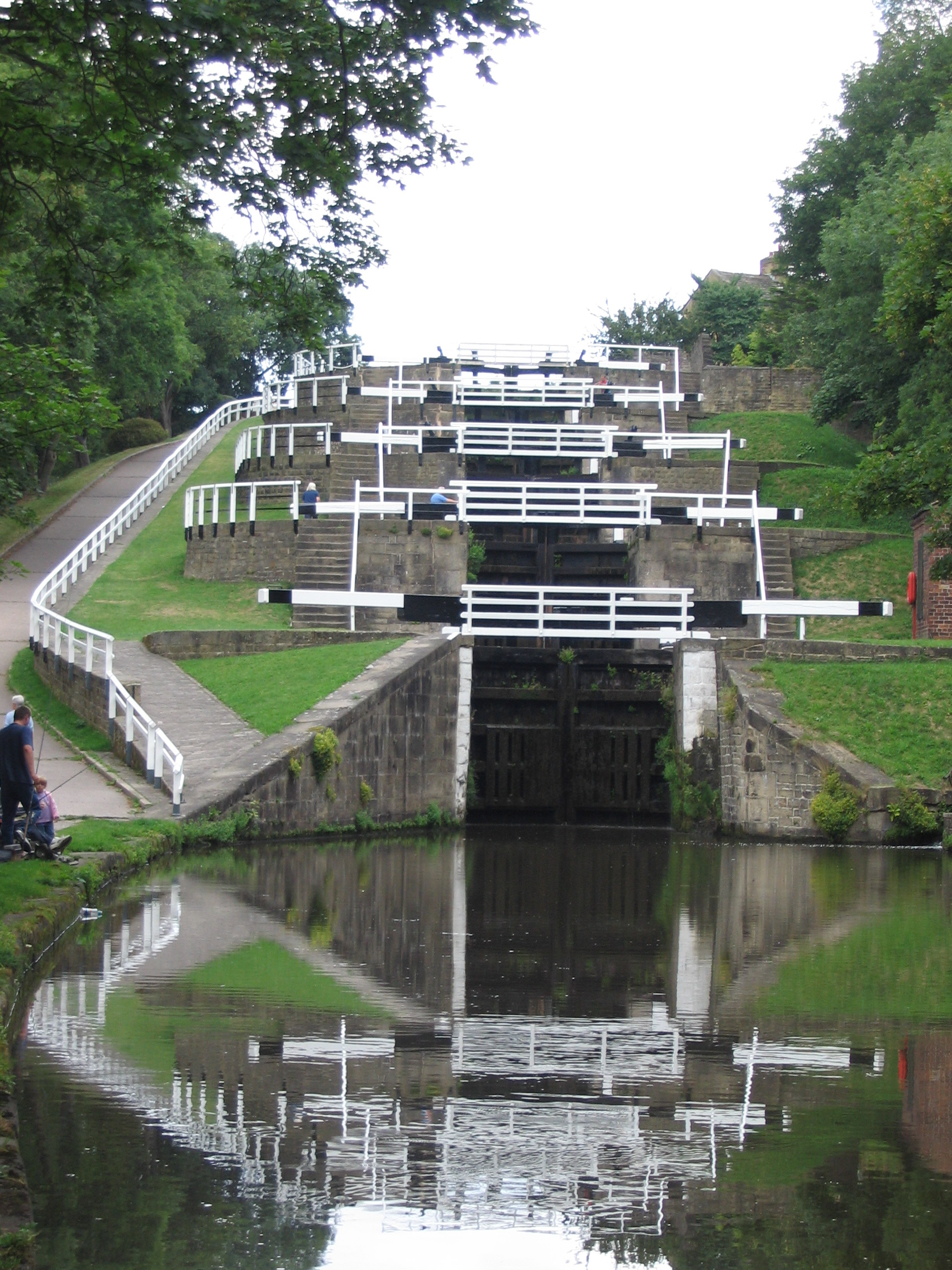
Bingley Five Rise Locks

A commencement ceremony was held at Halsall, north of Liverpool on 5 November 1770, with the first sod being dug by the Hon. Charles Mordaunt of Halsall Hall. The first section of the canal opened from Bingley to Skipton in 1773. By 1774 the canal had been completed from Skipton to Shipley, including significant engineering features such as the Bingley Five Rise Locks, Bingley Three Rise Locks and the seven-arch aqueduct over the River Aire, at Dowley Gap. Also completed was the branch to Bradford. On the western side, the section from Liverpool to Newburgh was dug. By the following year the Yorkshire end had been extended to Gargrave, and by 1777 the canal had joined the Aire and Calder Navigation in Leeds. From Liverpool it had reached Wigan by 1781, replacing the earlier and unsatisfactory Douglas Navigation. By now, the subscribed funds and further borrowing had all been spent, and work stopped in 1781 with the completion of the Rufford Branch from Burscough to the River Douglas at Tarleton. The war in the American colonies and its aftermath made it impossible to continue for more than a decade.

==== Second phase ====
Leeds and Liverpool Canal Act 1790
- Act of Parliament
- Parliament of Great Britain
- Long title: An Act to enable the Company of Proprietors of the Canal Navigation from Leeds to Liverpool, to vary the Line of the said Canal Navigation, and to raise a further Sum of Money for the Purpose of completing the said Canal Navigation, and for other Purposes.
- Citation: 30 Geo. 3. c. 65
- Territorial extent: Great Britain

Dates
- Royal assent: 9 June 1790
- Commencement: 21 January 1790
Other legislation
Amends	Leeds and Liverpool Canal Act 1783
Amended by	Leeds and Liverpool Canal Act 1794; Leeds and Liverpool Canal Branch and Railway Act 1819
Relates to	Leeds and Liverpool Canal Act 1770

Status: Amended

Text of statute as originally enacted

In 1789 Robert Whitworth developed fresh proposals to vary the line of the remaining part of the canal, including a tunnel at Foulridge, lowering the proposed summit level by 40 feet (12 m), using a more southerly route in Lancashire. These proposals were authorised by a fresh act of Parliament, the Leeds and Liverpool Canal Act 1790 (30 Geo. 3. c. 65), together with further fund-raising, and in 1791, construction of the canal finally recommenced south-westward from Gargrave, heading toward Barrowford in Lancashire. By this time planning for the competing Rochdale Canal was under way and it was likely to offer a more direct journey to Liverpool via Manchester and the Bridgewater Canal. The same year John Rennie surveyed a branch of the Rochdale between Todmorden and Burnley.

Leeds and Liverpool Canal Act 1794
- Act of Parliament
- Parliament of Great Britain
- Long title: An act to enable the company of proprietors of the canal navigation from Leeds to Liverpool, to complete the said navigation, and to vary the line thereof, and to raise a further sum of money for those purposes; and for making a navigable branch, therein described, from the intended new line of the said canal.
- Citation: 34 Geo. 3. c. 94
- Territorial extent: Great Britain

Dates
- Royal assent: 9 May 1794
- Commencement: 21 January 1794
Other legislation
Amends	Leeds and Liverpool Canal Act 1790
Amended by	Leeds and Liverpool Canal Branch and Railway Act 1819; Leeds and Liverpool Canal Act 1891
Relates to	Leeds and Liverpool Canal Act 1770; Leeds and Liverpool Canal Act 1783

Status: Amended

Text of statute as originally enacted

In 1794 an agreement was reached with the Manchester, Bolton and Bury Canal company to create a link near Red Moss near Horwich. The company's experiences running the two sections of the canal had shown that coal not limestone would be its main cargo, and that there was plenty of income available from local trade between the settlements along the route. With this in mind in the same year, the route was changed again with a further act of Parliament, the Leeds and Liverpool Canal Act 1794 (34 Geo. 3. c. 94), moving closer to that proposed by Burdett.

The Manchester, Bolton and Bury Canal company proposed another link from Bury to Accrington. This new link would have been known as the Haslingden Canal. The Peel family asked the canal company not to construct the crossing over the River Hyndburn above their textile printworks; such a crossing would have required the construction of embankments, and reduced the water supply to their factories. Consequently, Accrington was bypassed and the Haslingden Canal was never built.

Yet more fund-raising took place, as the Foulridge Tunnel was proving difficult and expensive to dig. The new route took the canal south via the expanding coal mines at Burnley, Accrington and Blackburn, but would require some sizable earthworks to pass the former. The completion in 1796 of the 1,640-yard-long (1,500-metre) Foulridge Tunnel and the flight of seven locks at Barrowford enabled the canal to open to eastern Burnley. At a cost of £40,000 (about £3.65 million in 2014). The tunnel became the most expensive single item in the whole project.

At Burnley, rather than using two sets of locks to cross the shallow Calder valley, Whitworth designed the Burnley Embankment, a 1,350 yards (1,234 m) long and up to 60 feet (18 m) high earthwork. It would also require another 559 yards (511 m) tunnel nearby at Gannow and a sizeable cutting to allow the canal to traverse the hillside between the two. It took 5 years to complete this work, with the embankment alone costing £22,000, about £1.55 million in 2014 (comparing the historic opportunity cost of £22,000 in 1801 with 2014). Whitworth died aged 64, on 30 March 1799 and Samuel Fletcher, previously the inspector of works took over as engineer. Once the Burnley work was completed, the canal opened to Enfield near Accrington in 1801. It would be another 9 years until it reached Blackburn only 4 miles away. Following the French Revolution, Britain had been at war with France from 1793 to 1802. The peace proved temporary, with the Napoleonic Wars beginning the following year. High taxes and interest rates during this period made it difficult for the company to borrow money, and the pace of construction inevitably slowed.

==== Third phase ====
In 1804 Samuel Fletcher also died and his brother Joseph and son James were jointly appointed to replace him and they were provided with Gannow House in Burnley. In 1805 they estimated the cost of linking Enfield to Red Moss would be £245,275 and £101,725 for the shorter continuation to Wigan (totalling about £27.36 million in 2014). The planned link with the Manchester, Bolton and Bury did not materialize.

The latest plan for the route had it running parallel to, and then crossing the southern section of the Lancaster Canal, but common sense prevailed and the Leeds and Liverpool connected with the Lancaster Canal between Aspull and Johnson's Hillock. The main line of the canal was thus completed in 1816.

Leeds and Liverpool Canal Branch and Railway Act 1819
- Act of Parliament
- Parliament of the United Kingdom
- Long title: An Act to enable the Company of Proprietors of the Canal Navigation from Leeds to Liverpool, to make a Navigable Cut, and also a Collateral Branch or Railway, from their said Canal at Hennis Bridge near Wigan, to join the Duke of Bridgewater's Canal at Leigh, all in the County Palatine of Lancaster; and to amend the several Acts relating to the said Leeds and Liverpool Canal, and an Act for making the Rochdale Canal, so far as relates to certain Powers therein given to the late Duke of Bridgewater.
- Citation: 59 Geo. 3. c. cv
- Territorial extent: United Kingdom

Dates
- Royal assent: 21 June 1819
- Commencement: 21 June 1819 (Note: The Acts of Parliament (Commencement) Act 1793.)
Other legislation
Amends	Leeds and Liverpool Canal Act 1770; Leeds and Liverpool Canal Act 1783; Leeds and Liverpool Canal Act 1790; Leeds and Liverpool Canal Act 1794
Amended by	Leeds and Liverpool Canal Act 1891
Relates to	Rochdale Canal Act 1794; Lancaster Canal Navigation Act 1819

Status: Amended

Text of statute as originally enacted

There had been various unsuccessful negotiations to connect the canal to the Bridgewater Canal at Leigh but agreement was finally reached in 1818, and embodied in the Leeds and Liverpool Canal Branch and Railway Act 1819 (59 Geo. 3. c. cv) and the connection was opened in 1820, thus giving access to Manchester and the rest of the canal network. The Bridgewater Canal, like most of Brindley's designs was for boats of 72 feet (22 m) length, whereas the Leeds and Liverpool had been designed for broad boats of 62 feet (19 m) length. There was naturally a desire by the longer boats to reach Liverpool and the locks of the westerly end of the canal were extended to 72 feet (22 m) in 1822.

James Fletcher continued as engineer until his death in 1844.

=== Operation ===
The canal took almost 50 years to complete; in crossing the Pennines the Leeds and Liverpool had been beaten by the Huddersfield Narrow Canal and the Rochdale Canal. The most important cargo was always coal, with over a million tons per year being delivered to Liverpool in the 1860s. Even in Yorkshire, more coal was carried than limestone. Once the canal was fully open, receipts for carrying merchandise matched those of coal. The heavy industry along its route, together with the decision to build the canal with broad locks, ensured that (unlike the other two trans-Pennine canals) the Leeds and Liverpool competed successfully with the railways throughout the 19th century and remained open through the 20th century.

=== 20th century ===
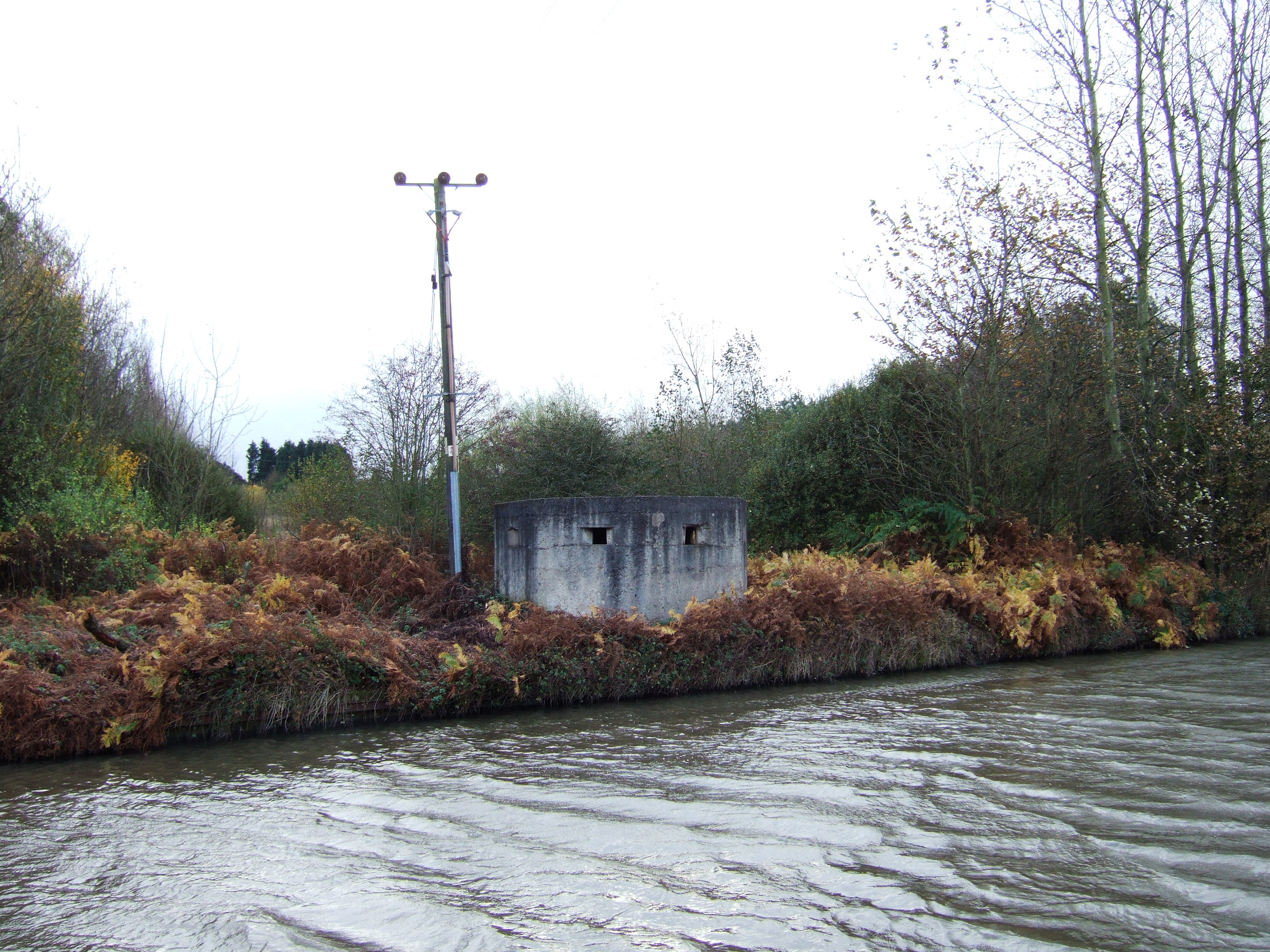
A concrete pillbox by the canal

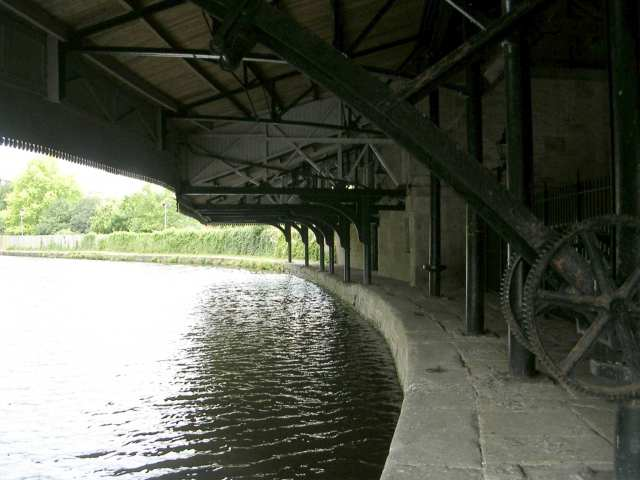
1890s warehouse - Weavers' Triangle - Leeds and Liverpool Canal

The canal suffered some damage during the Second World War. It was breached when a German bomb fell on it in Bootle. The canal in West Lancashire was part of Britain's defensive plans against invasion. Along the canal there were tank traps, bunkers and blockhouses. Some buildings such as barns and pubs along the canal were fortified. There are still some remaining concrete pillboxes and brick built blockhouses.

=== 21st century ===
In August 2010, a 60-mile stretch of the canal was closed due to the low reservoirs, following the driest start to the year since records began. It was reopened the following month, although some restrictions remained.

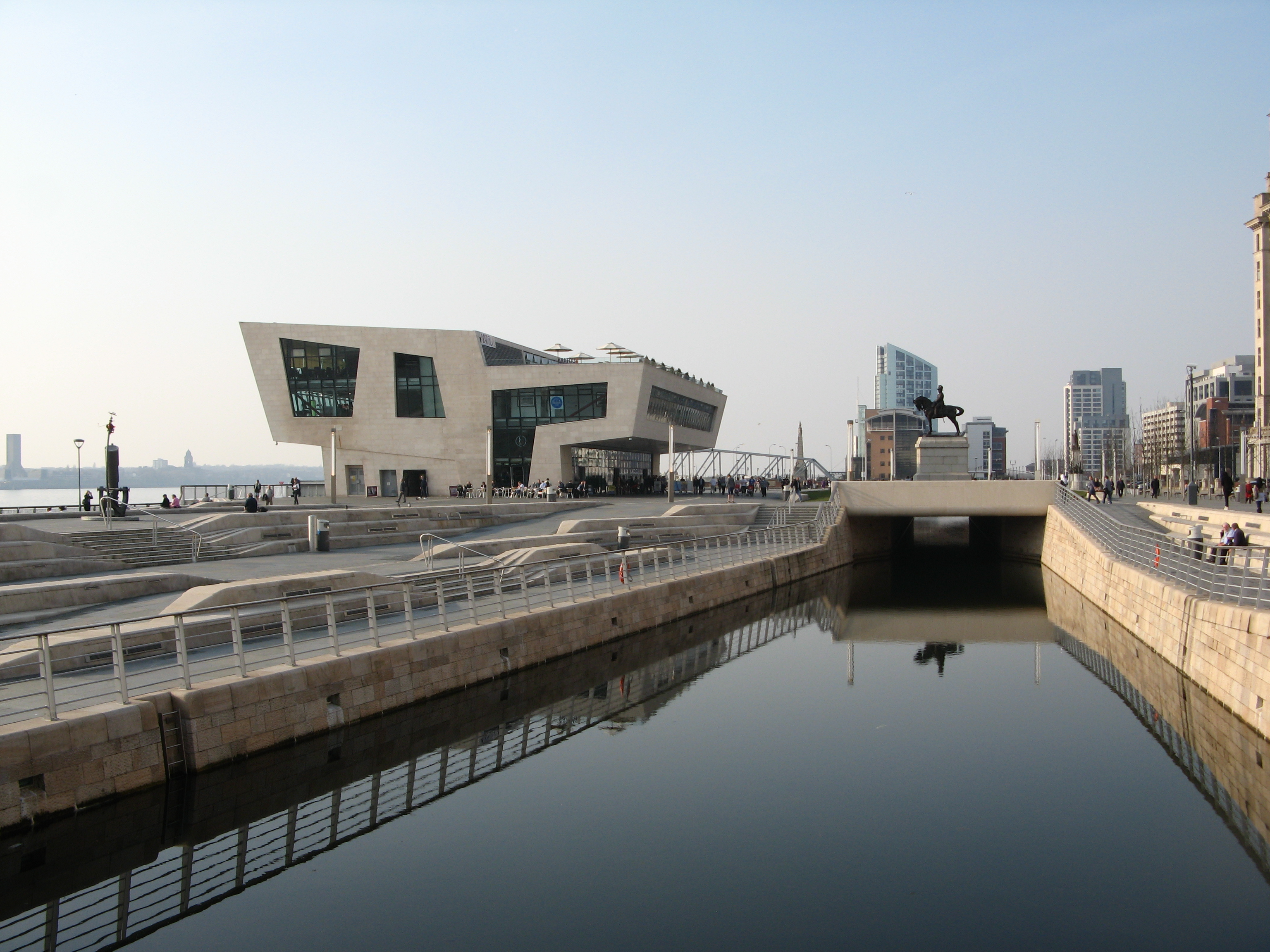
Liverpool Canal Link, Pier Head

The £22 million Liverpool Canal Link was completed in 2009, joining the Leeds and Liverpool Canal with the City Centre.

On 11 October 2021 the stretch between Barrowford and Blackburn was closed following a breach in the canal appearing between bridges 109 and 110.

Later that month, lock numbers 73 and 80 were among 142 sites across England to receive part of a £35-million grant from the government's Culture Recovery Fund.

== Route ==
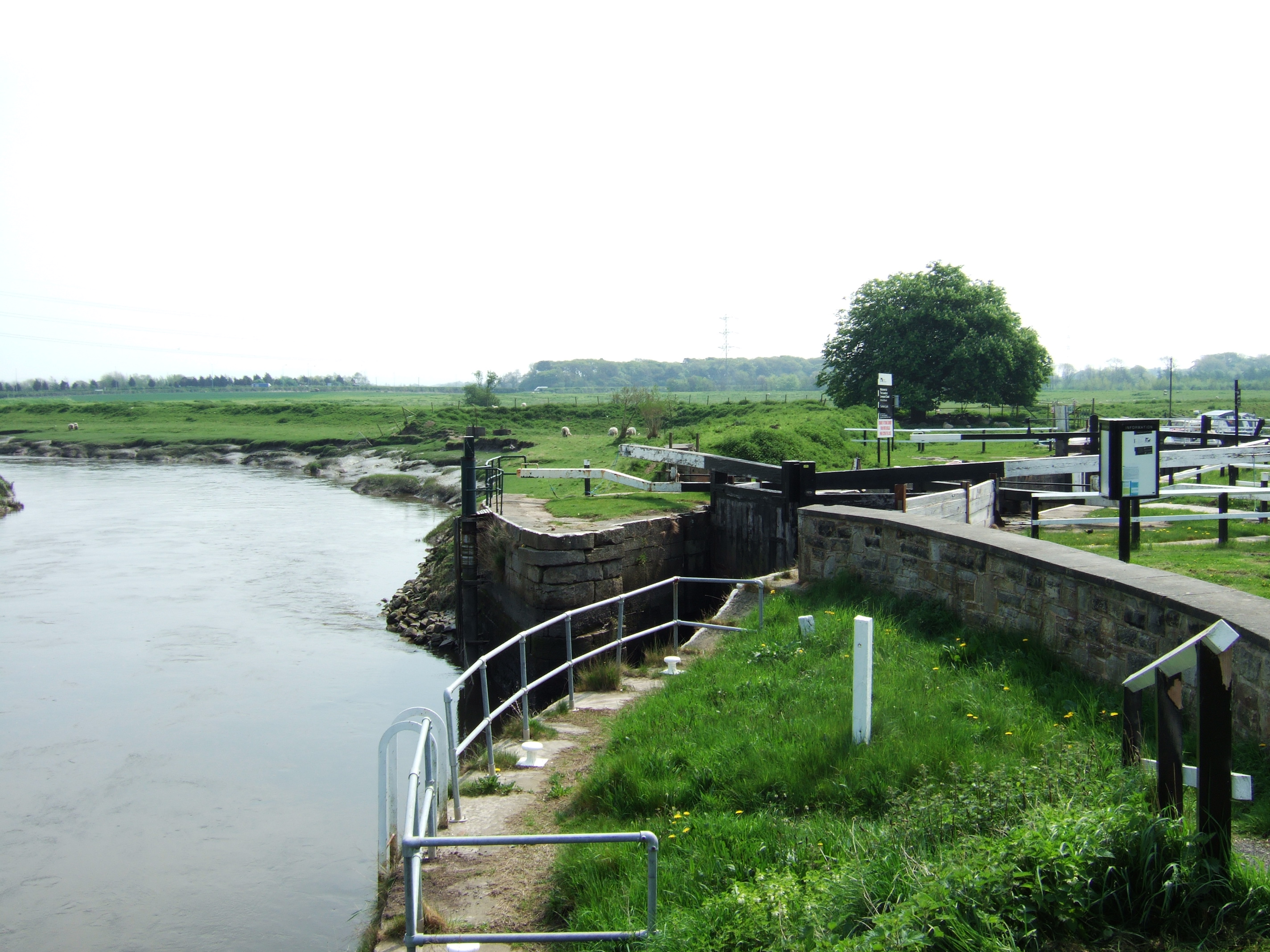
Tarleton Lock, where the Rufford Branch links into the River Douglas.

The Leeds and Liverpool Canal is 127 miles (204 km) long and crosses the country from Liverpool to Leeds, via East Lancashire and the Pennines. It was generally built with locks 60 ft (18 m) long and 14 ft 3 in (4.34 m) wide.

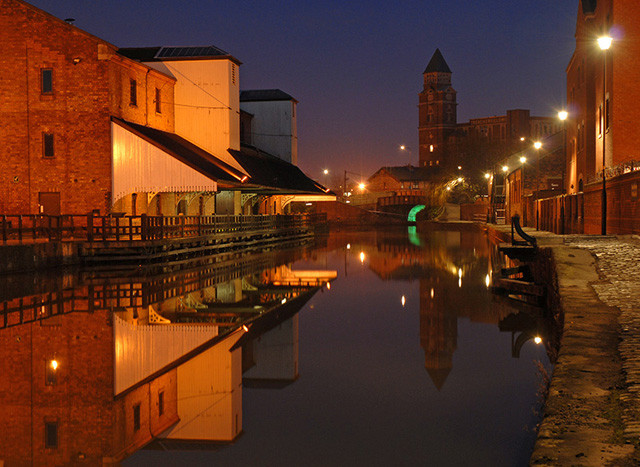
The Leeds and Liverpool Canal at Wigan Pier

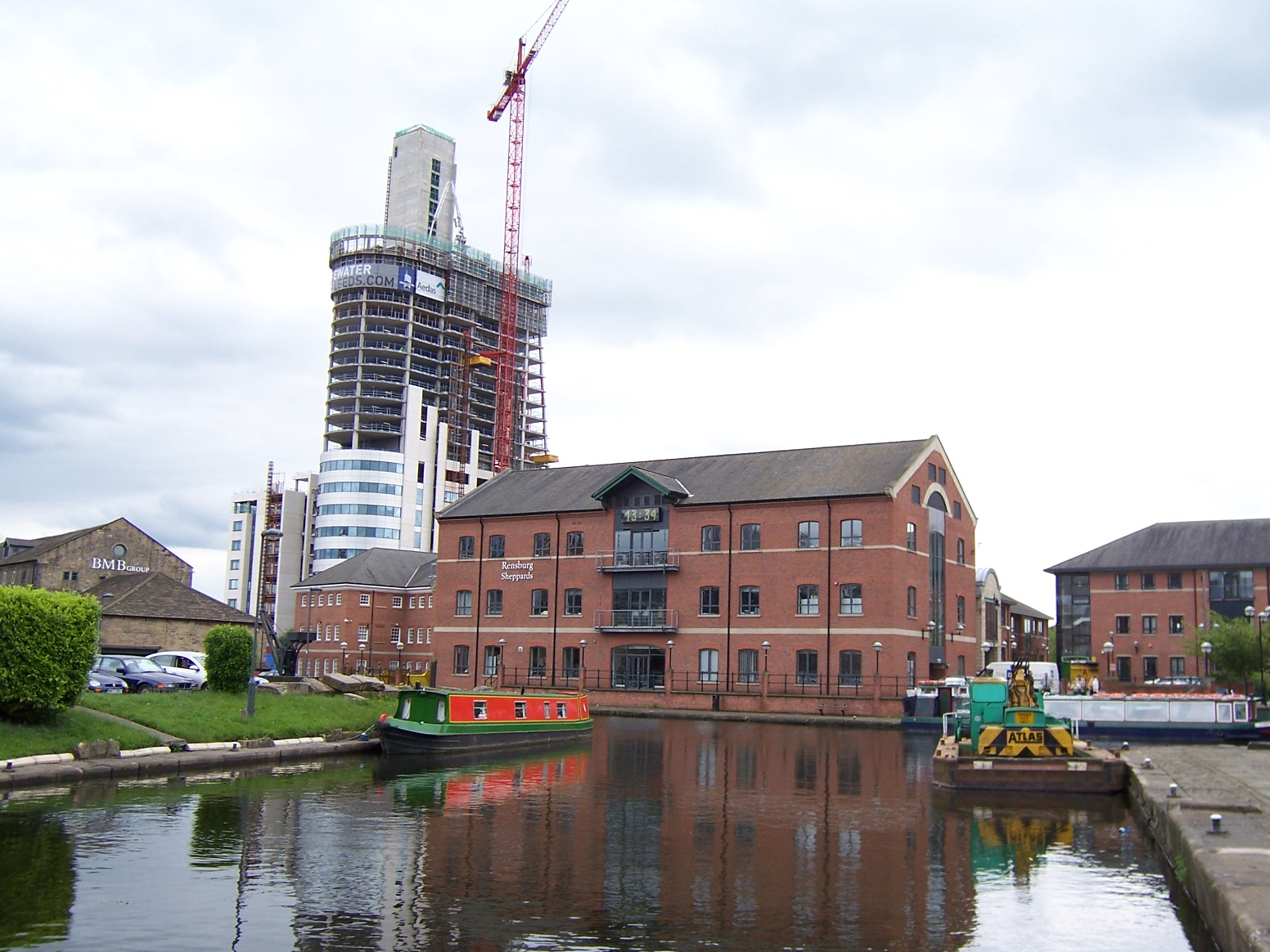
Leeds and Liverpool Canal near Granary Wharf in Leeds

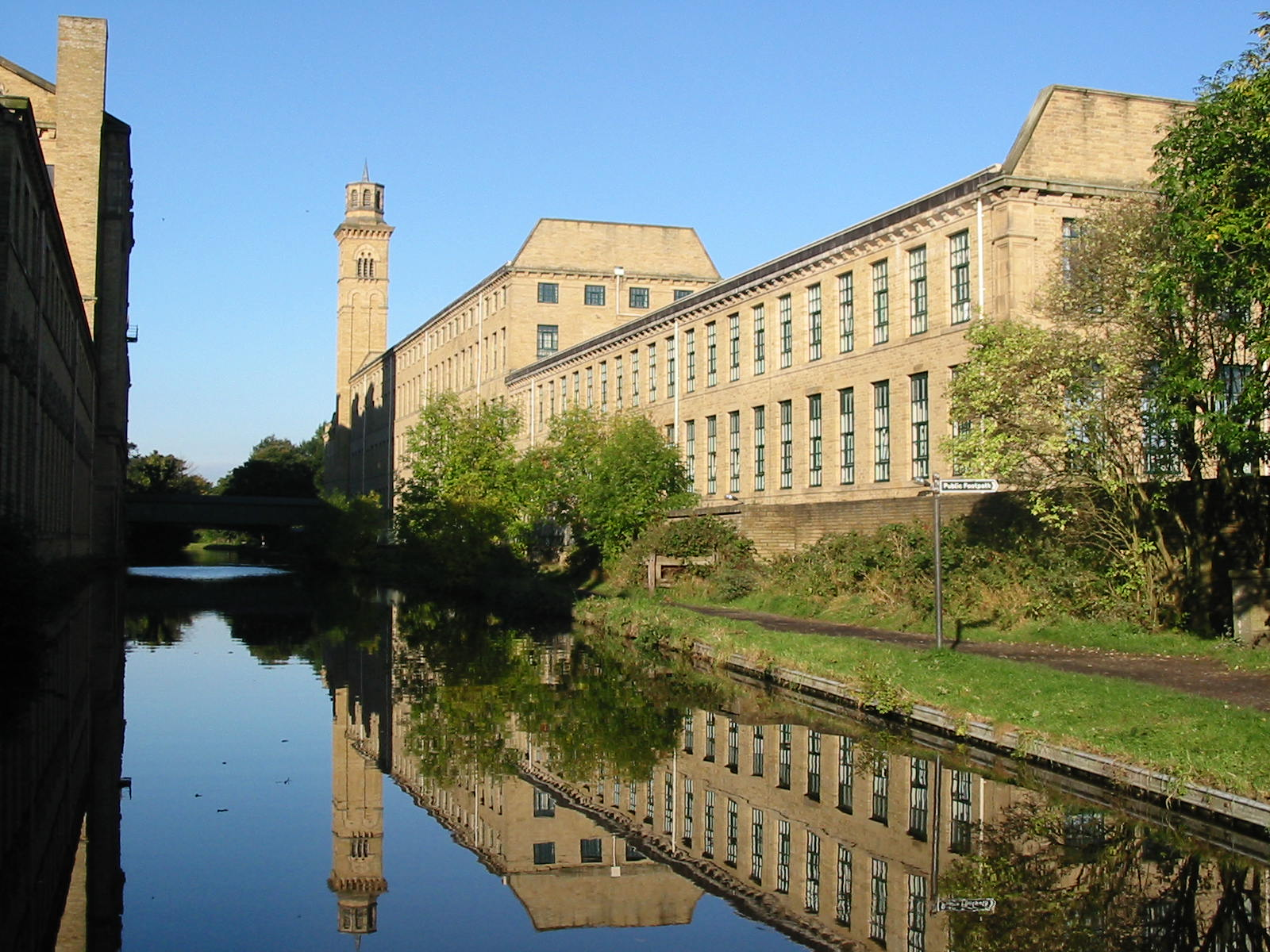
Leeds to Liverpool Canal, Saltaire. Mill buildings built by Sir Titus Salt.

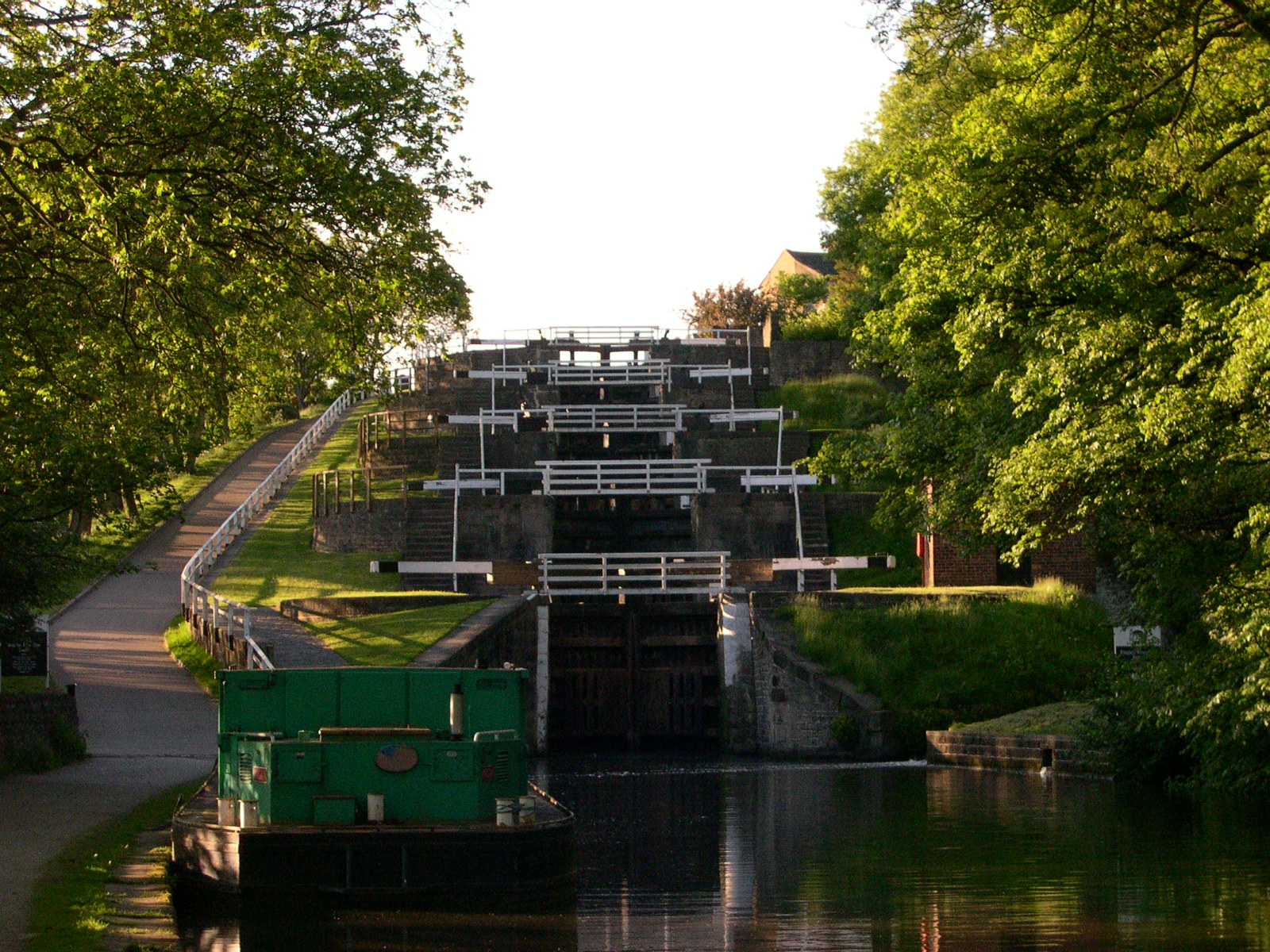
Bingley Five Rise Locks

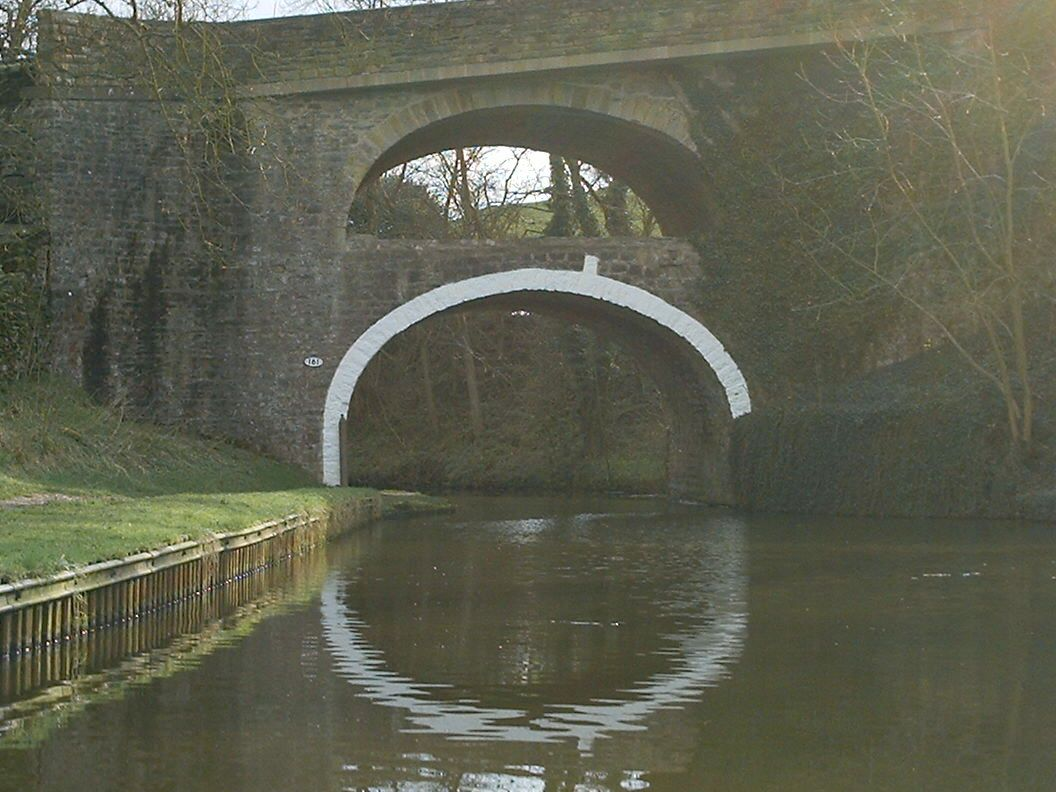
The Double Arched bridge (number 161) at East Marton

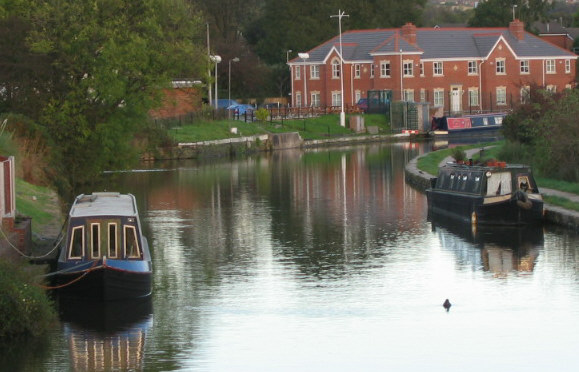
Canal boats at Appley Bridge

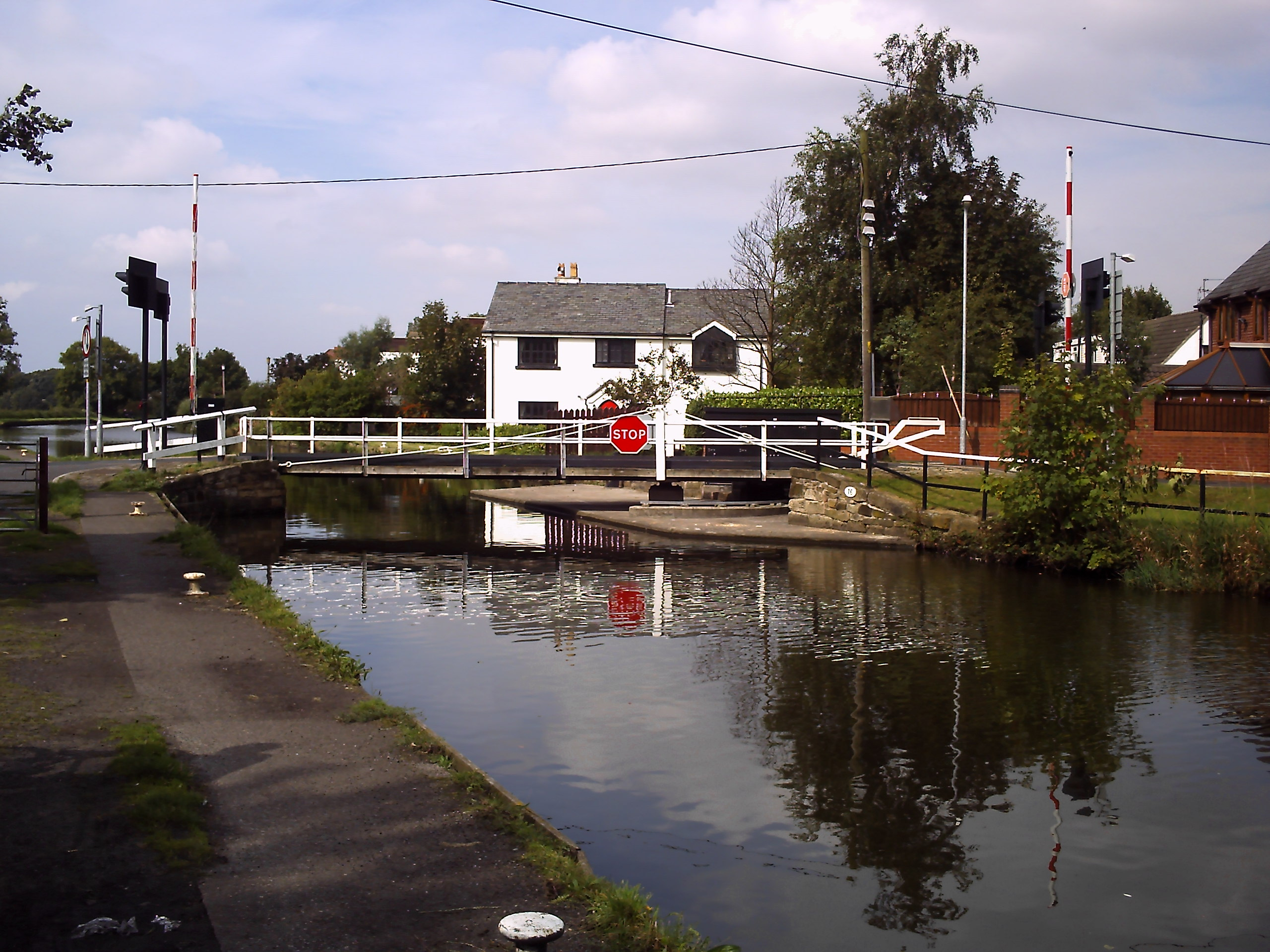
Bell's Swing Bridge#16 in Lydiate

From Liverpool to Appley Locks, the canal runs for 27 miles (43 km) without locks, across the West Lancashire Coastal Plain.

The two main side-branches both connect to other waterways. The Rufford Branch links into the River Douglas and, via the Ribble Link and the River Ribble to the previously isolated Lancaster Canal. The Leigh Branch from Wigan leads to the Bridgewater Canal and thus to Manchester and the Midlands.

The canal at Aintree passes close to the racecourse and gives the name to the course's Canal Turn.

== Places en route ==
Direction: East (top) to west (bottom)

- Leeds
- Granary Wharf, Leeds city centre
- Armley Pool
- Kirkstall
- Bramley
- Apperley Bridge
- Shipley
- Saltaire
- Bingley
- Keighley
- Silsden
- Skipton
- Gargrave
- Barnoldswick
- Foulridge Tunnel
- Nelson
- Brierfield
- Burnley
- Hapton
- Clayton-le-Moors
- Church
- Oswaldtwistle
- Rishton
- Blackburn
- Wheelton
- Chorley
- Adlington
- Aspull

Wigan flight
- Ince in Makerfield
Leigh branch
- Leigh

- Wigan – Wigan Pier
- Appley Bridge
- Parbold

Rufford branch:
- Rufford, Tarleton

- Burscough
- Scarisbrick
- Halsall
- Maghull
- Melling
- Aintree
- Litherland
- Bootle
- Vauxhall

Stanley Dock Branch:
- Stanley Dock

- Liverpool

== See also ==
- Leeds and Liverpool Canal Society

== Bibliography ==
- Fisher, Stuart (2017). The Canals of Britain: The Comprehensive Guide (3 ed.). London: Bloomsbury. ISBN 978-1-4729-2972-3.
- Priestley, Joseph (1831). Historical Account of the Navigable Rivers, Canals and Railways of Great Britain. Longman, Green.
- Skempton, Sir Alec; et al. (2002). A Biographical Dictionary of Civil Engineers in Great Britain and Ireland: Vol 1: 1500 to 1830. Thomas Telford. ISBN 0-7277-2939-X.
