= Blacko (disambiguation) =

Blacko is a village in Lancashire, England.

Blacko may also refer to:

- Blacko and Higherford, one of the electoral wards that form the Parliamentary constituency of Pendle, Lancashire, England
- Blacko, Croatia, a village in Požega-Slavonia County, Croatia
- Blacko (singer), French musical artist
