= Chadbourne =

Chadbourne, Chadbourn, Chadburn, Chadburne, or Chatburn may refer to:

== People ==
- Chet Chadbourne (1884–1943), American major league baseball player
- Eugene Chadbourne (born 1954), American guitarist and banjoist
- Glenn Chadbourne (born 1959), American artist and illustrator
- Jack Chadburn (1873–1923), English professional footballer
- James H. Chadbourn (1905–1982), American legal scholar and professor of law at Harvard University
- Joe Chadbourne (1883–1958), English professional footballer
- Joshua Chadbourne (1873–1959), American auto mechanic, businessman and apricot farmer
- Leo Chadburn, English experimental musician and classical composer, known by his stage name "Simon Bookish"
- Lloyd Chadburn (1919–1944), Canadian World War II fighter pilot
- Mark Chadbourn (born 1960), English fantasy, horror and science fiction writer
- Maud Chadburn (1868–1957), English surgeon, one of the first women in the United Kingdom to pursue that career
- Paul A. Chadbourne (1823–1883), American educator and naturalist
- Thomas Chadbourne (1871–1938), American lawyer who founded the firm now known as Chadbourne & Parke LLP

== Places ==
- Chadbourne Elementary School, a primary school in Fremont, California named for Joshua Chadbourne
- Chadbourn, North Carolina, a town in Columbus County, North Carolina
- Chatburn, a village in East Lancashire, England
- Fort Chadbourne, a fort established by the United States Army in 1852 in present-day Coke County, Texas
- Paul A. Chadbourne House, a dormitory at the University of Massachusetts Amherst

== Other uses ==
- Chadbourne & Parke, a New York-based international law firm founded by Thomas Chadbourne
- Engine order telegraph, a shipboard communications device colloquially known as a chadburn
- Wilmington, Chadbourn and Conway Railroad, an American railroad spanning North and South Carolina that operated during the 19th century
