= Roughlee =

Village in Lancashire, England

Coordinates: 53.859°N 2.238°W

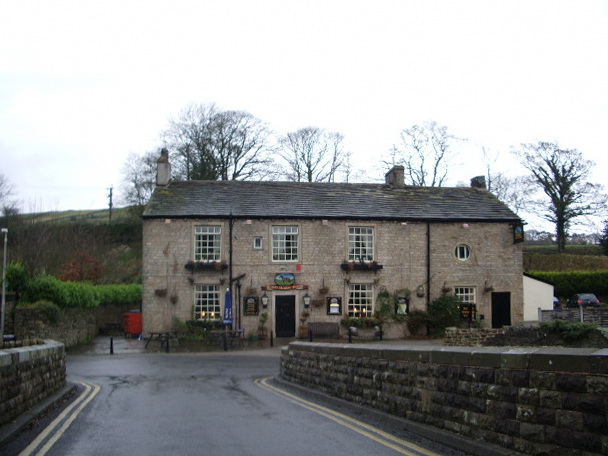
- The Bay Horse public house

- Location in Pendle Borough Location in the Forest of Bowland AONB Location within Lancashire
- OS grid reference: SD843403
- Civil parish: Roughlee Booth
- District: Pendle
- Shire county: Lancashire
- Region: North West
- Country: England
- Sovereign state: United Kingdom
- Post town: NELSON
- Postcode district: BB9
- Dialling code: 01282
- Police: Lancashire
- Fire: Lancashire
- Ambulance: North West
- UK Parliament: Pendle and Clitheroe

Roughlee /roʊˈliː/ is a village in the civil parish of Roughlee Booth, in the Pendle district, in the county of Lancashire, England. It is close to Nelson, Barrowford and Blacko. The village lies at the foot of Pendle Hill, well known for the Pendle Witches, and includes the hamlet of Crowtrees.

The village has won the small village category of the Lancashire Best Kept Village competition in 2006, and the champion village category in 2007. It was also runner-up in the champion category in 2009.

The village is featured in Joseph Delaney's 2008 novel The Spook's Battle.

According to the United Kingdom Census 2011, the parish has a population of 318, a decrease from 328 in the 2001 census.

== Notable people ==
- Alice Nutter (witch) was accused in Pendle and hanged as a witch in 1612 and now has a statue in the village.
- Bobby Elliott who was a drummer in the Hollies lives here.

== See also ==
- Listed buildings in Roughlee Booth
