= Christ Church, Chatburn =

Coordinates: 53.8941°N 2.3516°W

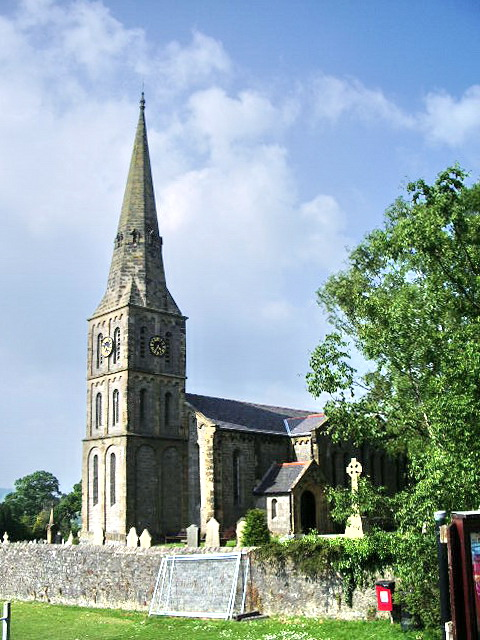
- Christ Church, Chatburn, from the southwest

- Location in the Borough of Ribble Valley
- OS grid reference: SD 769,442
- Location: Chatburn, Lancashire
- Country: England
- Denomination: Anglican
- Website: www.ChristChurchChatburn.org.uk

History
- Status: Parish church
- Founded: 22 June 1837
- Founder: Dixon Robinson
- Dedication: Jesus Christ
- Consecrated: 18 September 1838

Architecture
- Functional status: Active
- Heritage designation: Grade II
- Designated: 27 April 1984
- Architect(s): Edmund Sharpe; Frederick Robinson
- Architectural type: Church
- Style: Romanesque Revival
- Groundbreaking: 1837
- Completed: 1883

Administration
- Province: York
- Diocese: Blackburn
- Archdeaconry: Blackburn
- Deanery: Whalley
- Parish: Christ Church, Chatburn

Clergy
- Priest: Revd Dr Judith Clark

Christ Church is in the village of Chatburn, Lancashire, England. It is an active Anglican parish church in the deanery of Whalley, the archdeaconry of Blackburn and the diocese of Blackburn. The church is recorded in the National Heritage List for England as a designated Grade II listed building.

== History ==
Construction of the church began in 1837, the architect being Edmund Sharpe of Lancaster. It was one of Sharpe's first commissions and one of his early churches in Romanesque style. The church was founded by Dixon Robinson, steward of the Honour of Clitheroe who, with his older brother William, partly paid for it. The foundation stone was laid on 22 June 1837. Under the stone a bottle was placed containing coins, medals, and a copy of the Blackburn Standard. An article in the Blackburn Standard suggested that Christ Church was the first to be commenced during the reign of Queen Victoria. (Note: Queen Victoria succeeded to the throne on 20 June.) The estimated cost of the church was £950 (equivalent to £90,000 in 2025), towards which the Incorporated Church Building Society contributed a grant of £250. It provided seating for 364 people. The church was consecrated on 18 September 1838 by the Bishop of Chester.

On 3 May 1854 the spire was struck by lightning, damaging both the spire and the tower. In 1881 it was decided to enlarge the church, and the architect Frederick Josias Robinson, son of Dixon Robinson, who was practising in Derby, was commissioned to design and supervise this. The nave was widened by the addition of north and south aisles, and the chancel by the addition of a north transept, acting as an organ chamber, and a south transept, used as a choir vestry. This was carried out in 1882–83. The architectural historian Nikolaus Pevsner remarks on the uniform architectural style used by the two architects, writing "all is so entirely of a piece".

== Architecture ==
The original parts of Christ Church are constructed in limestone with sandstone dressings and it has a slate roof; the spire is in sandstone. The expansion of 1882–83 is in Runcorn red sandstone, with dressings in Bath stone. The tower has three stages; the lowest stage has two blank arches on each side and two round-headed windows on the west front. There are similar windows on each side of both upper stages, and in the top stage are clock faces. The plan of the church consists of a west tower with a spire, a nave with north and south aisles and a south porch, and a chancel with a semicircular apse. Internally, at the west end is a gallery. The two-manual organ was made by Brindley & Foster of Sheffield in 1890.

== External features ==
The churchyard contains the war graves of three soldiers of World War I, and a soldier and airman of World War II.

== See also ==
- Listed buildings in Chatburn
- List of architectural works by Edmund Sharpe
