= Roughlee Booth =

Civil parish in England

Coordinates: 53.859°N 2.238°W

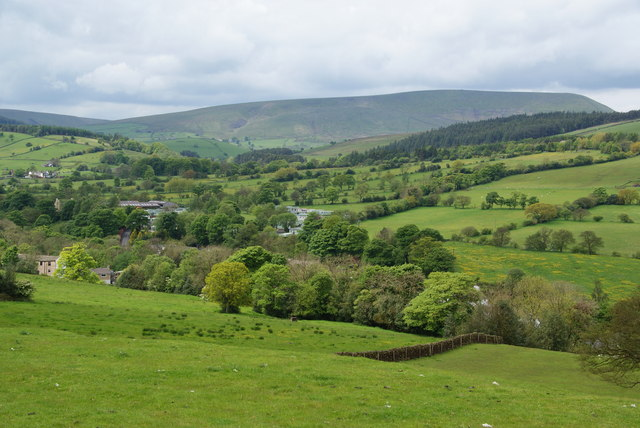
- A view over Roughlee

- Location within Lancashire
- Area: 4.49 km^{2} (1.73 sq mi)
- Population: 318
  - Density: 71/km^{2} (180/sq mi)
- Civil parish: Roughlee Booth
- District: Pendle
- Shire county: Lancashire
- Region: North West
- Country: England
- Sovereign state: United Kingdom
- Postcode district: BB9, BB12
- Dialling code: 01282
- Website: Roughlee Parish Council

Civil Parish map of Pendle- Roughlee Booth is located in the parish marked 3

Roughlee Booth is a civil parish located in Pendle, Lancashire. It is approximately 449.43 hectares in size and situated in the Forest of Bowland AONB. It borders on the parishes of Blacko, Barrowford, Old Laund Booth, Goldshaw Booth and Barley-with-Wheatley Booth. It is part of the Forest of Bowland Area of Outstanding Natural Beauty (AONB). It contains the village of Roughlee and hamlets of Crow Trees and Thornley Holme. According to the 2011 United Kingdom census, the parish has a population of 318, a decrease from 328 in the 2001 census.

== Governance ==
Along with Higham-with-West Close Booth, Goldshaw Booth and Barley-with-Wheatley Booth, the parish forms the Higham with Pendleside ward of Pendle Borough Council.

Roughlee Booth was once a township in the ancient parish of Whalley. This became a civil parish in 1866, forming part of the Burnley Rural District from 1894 until 1974. The village of Newchurch in Pendle used to straddle the boundary with Goldshaw Booth, (Note: In 1848, the boundary passed just east of St Mary's Church.) but that part of the parish was transferred in 1935.

== Media gallery ==
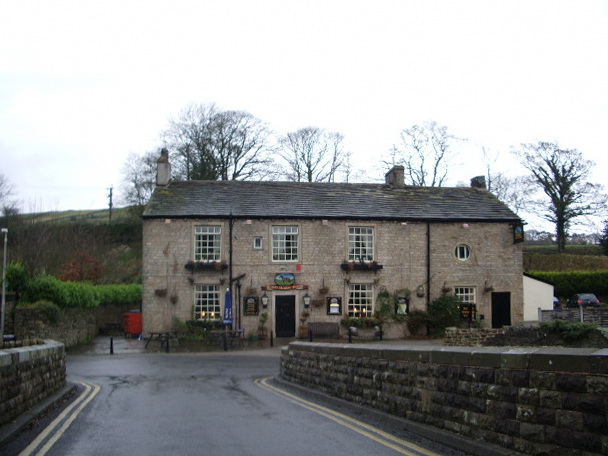
The Bay Horse public house in Roughlee village

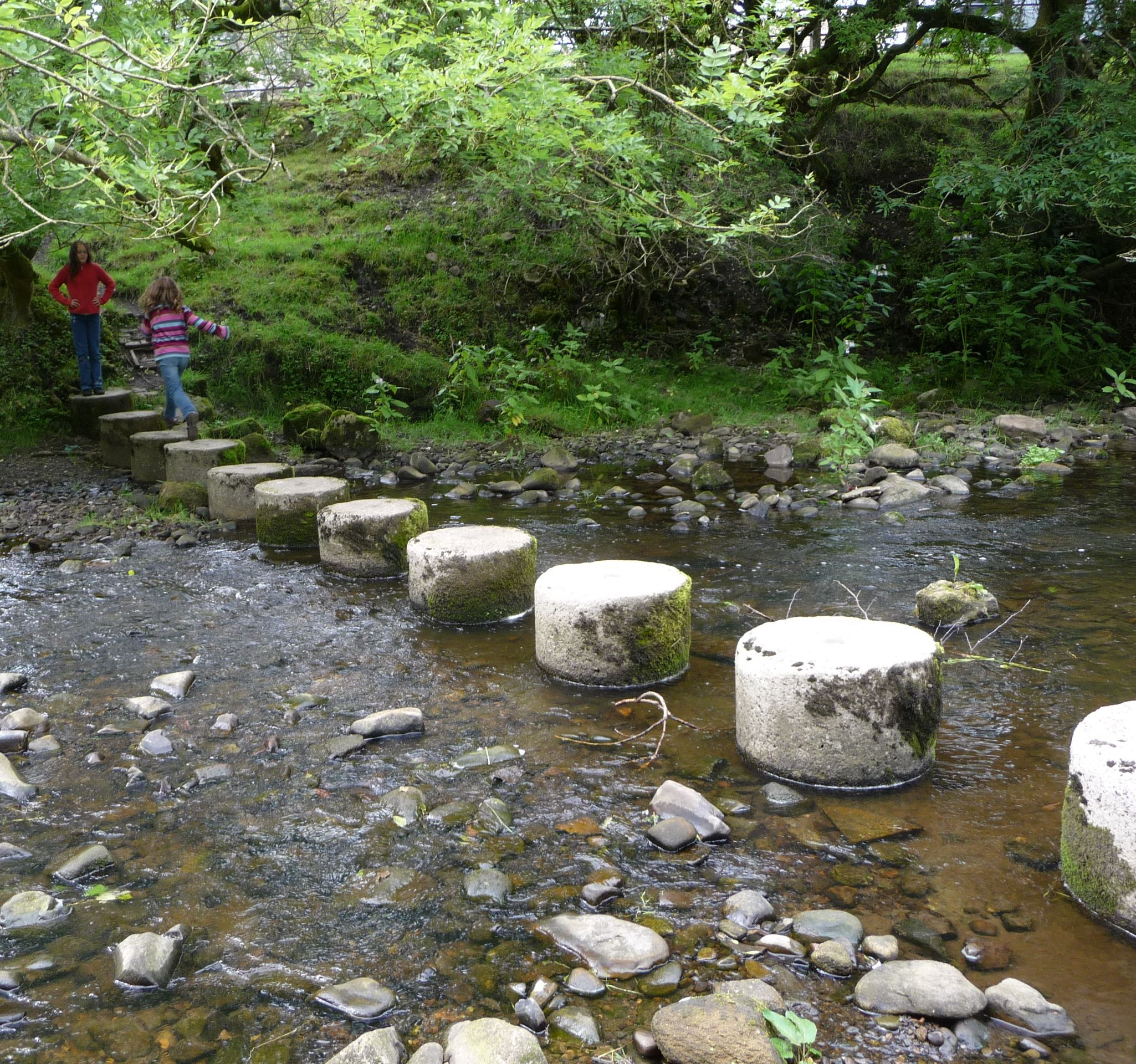
Stepping stones over Pendle Water near Roughlee Old Hall

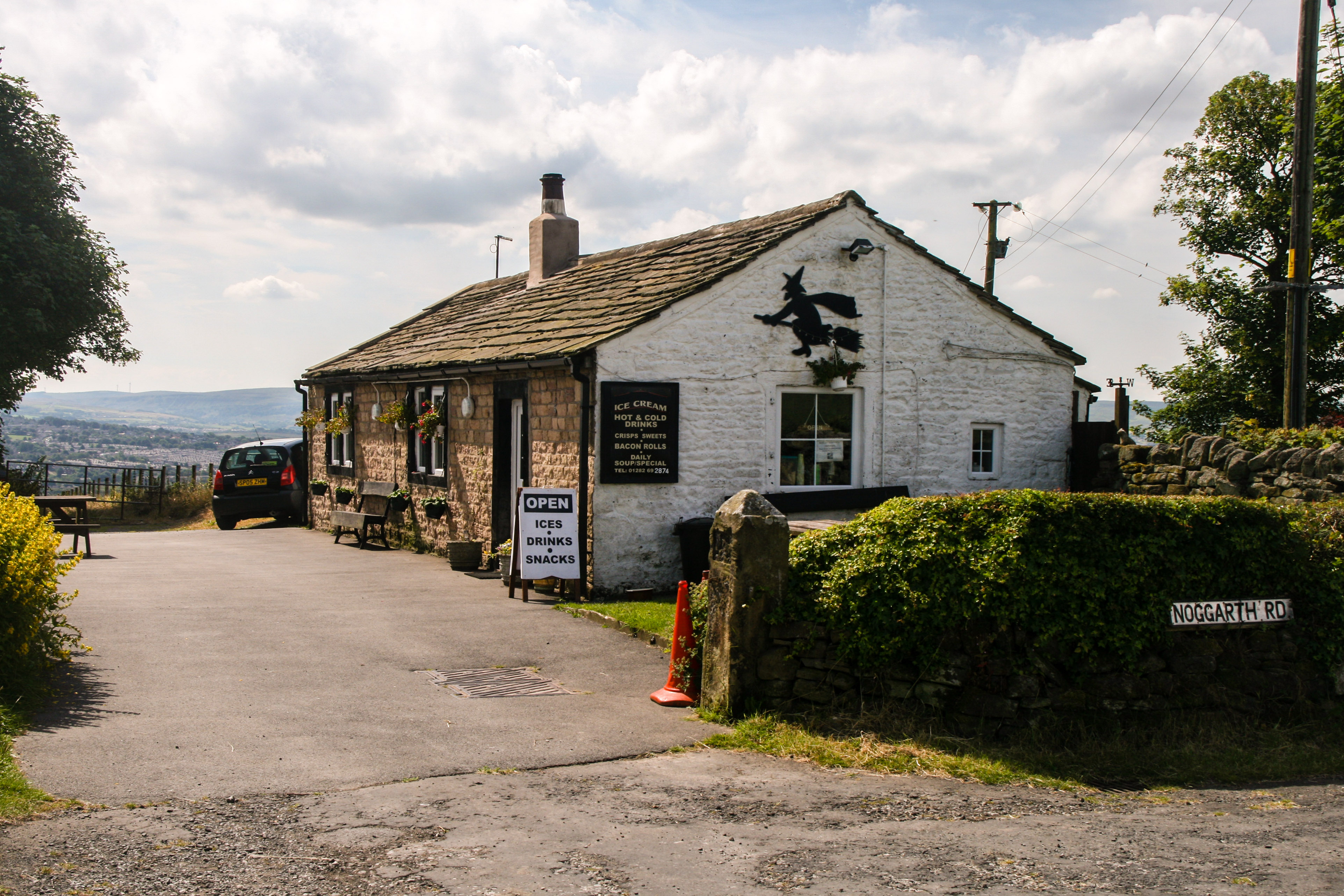
Noggarth Tea Gardens

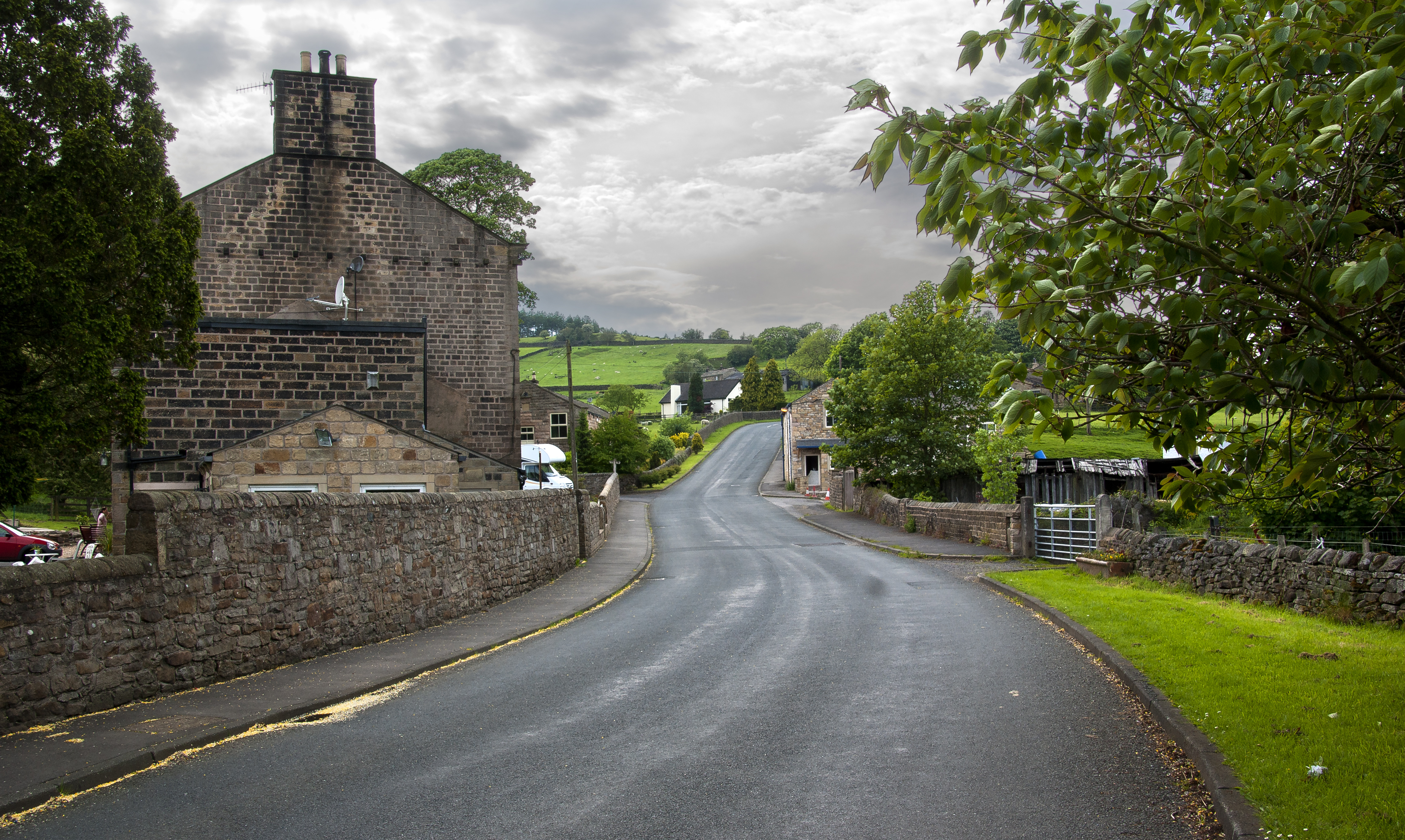
Thornley Holme, on the road to Barley

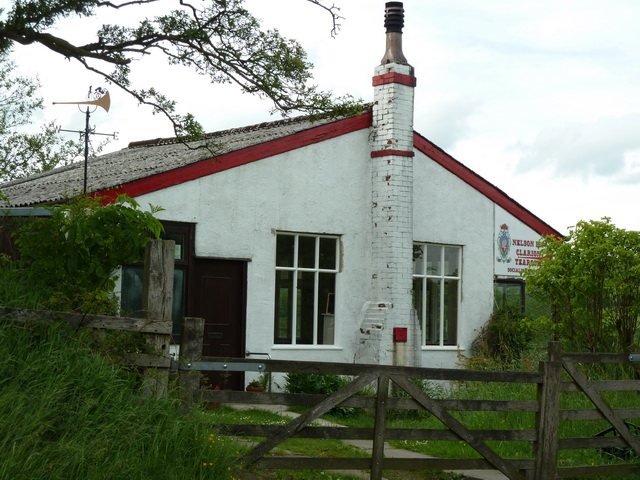
Clarion House, home of the Nelson Independent Labour Party Land Society

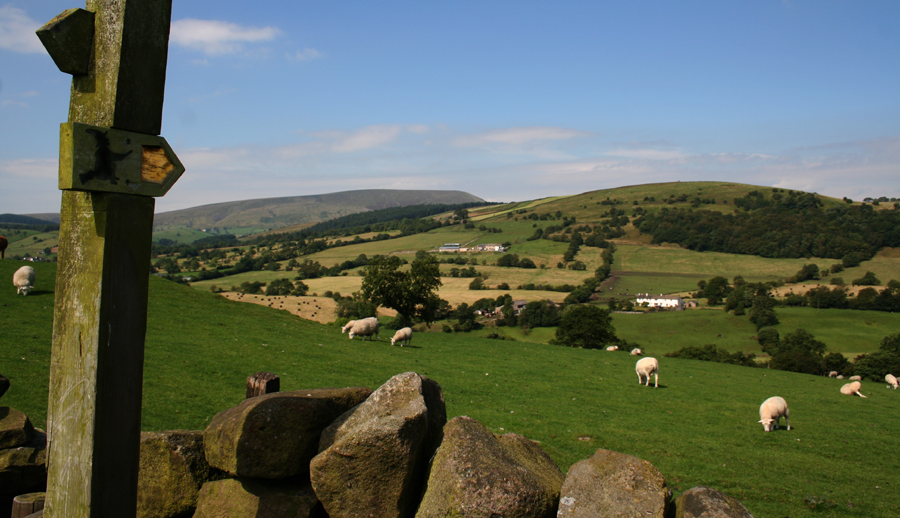
The Pendle Way passes through the parish

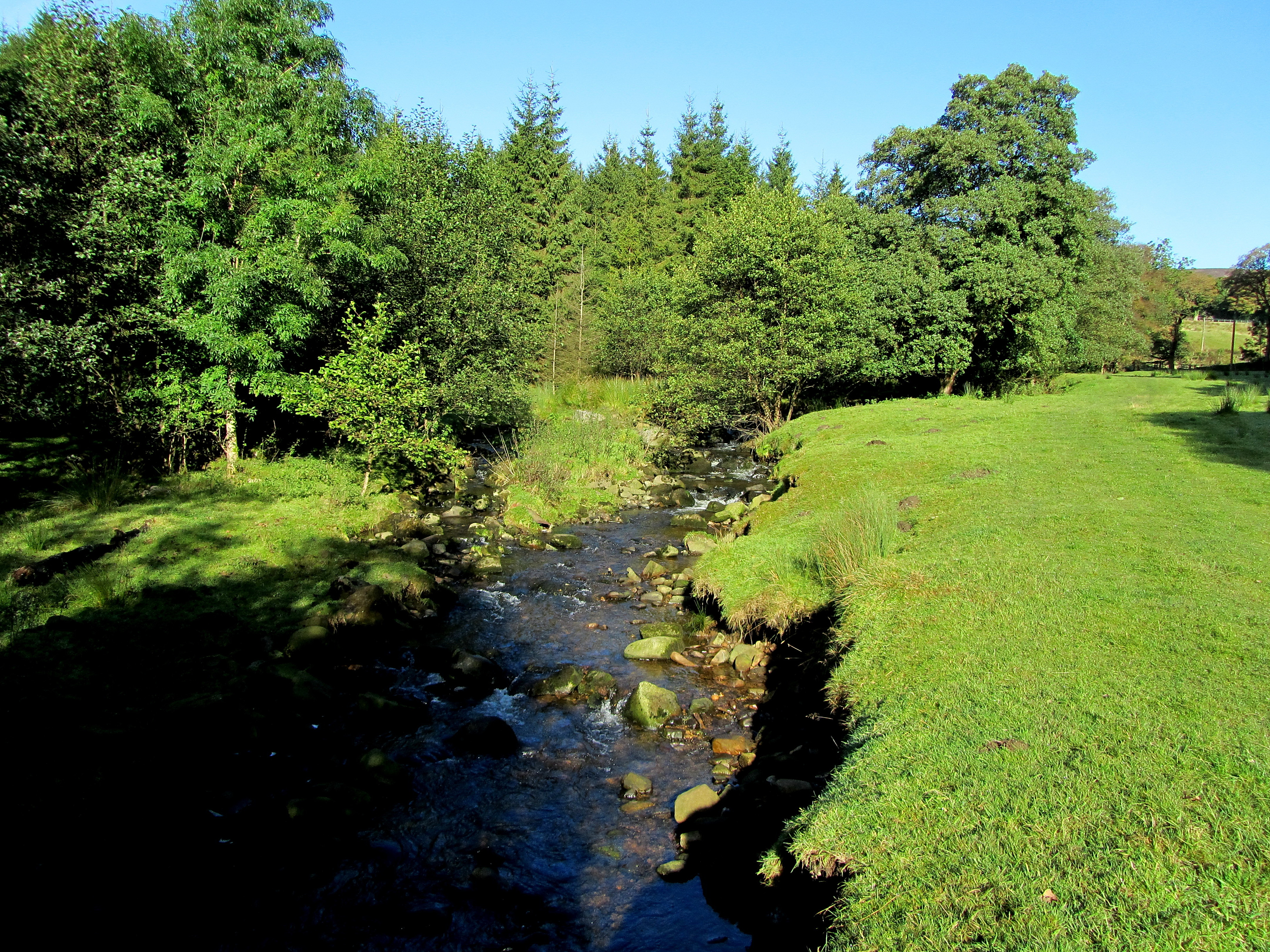
Blacko Water in the east of the parish

== See also ==
- Listed buildings in Roughlee Booth
