= Chatburn railway station =

Disused railway station in Lancashire, England

Coordinates: 53.88913°N 2.35654°W

Chatburn
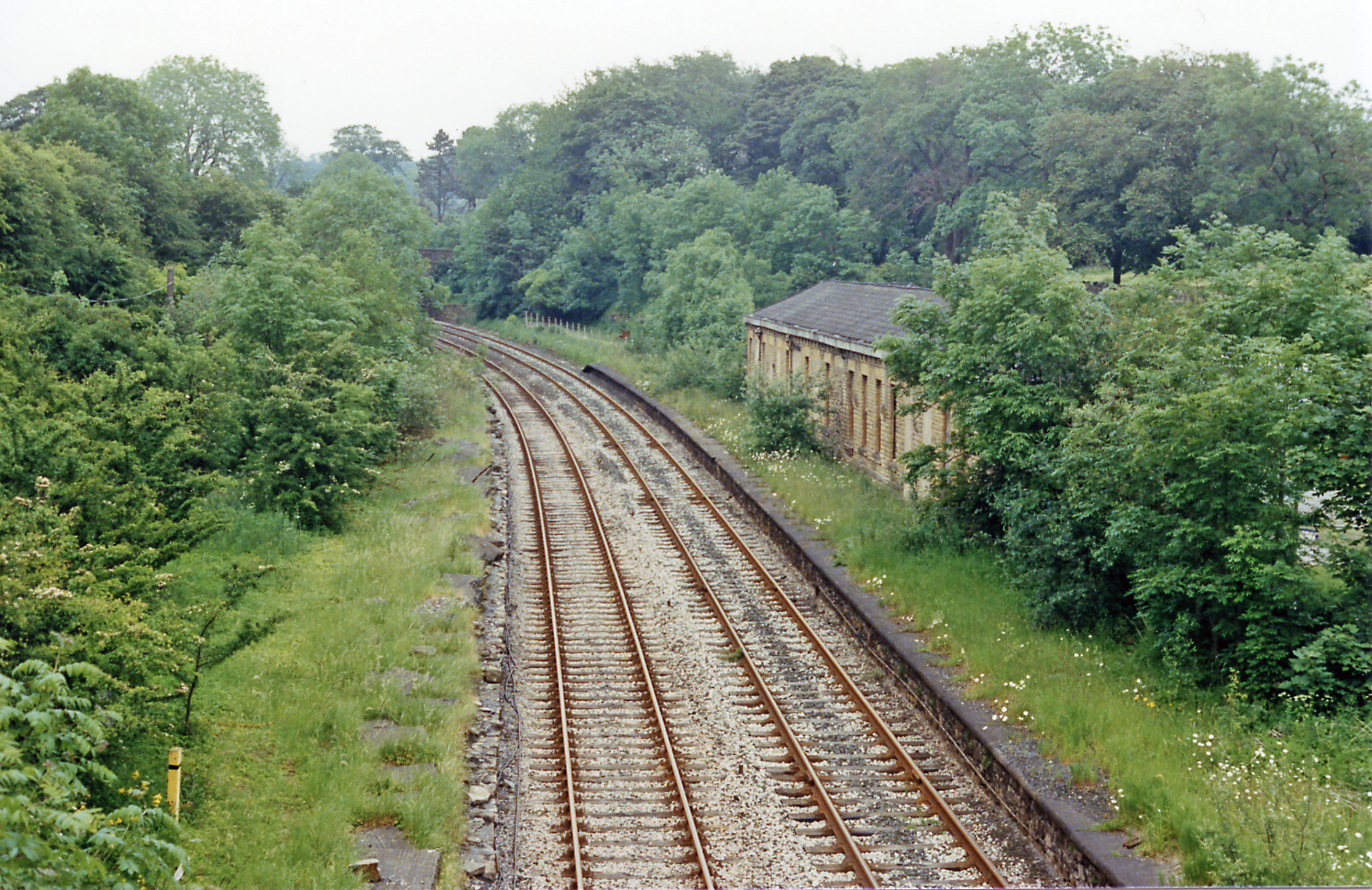
- Remains of the station in 1985

General information
- Location: Chatburn, Ribble Valley, Lancashire; England
- Platforms: 2

Other information
- Status: Disused

History
- Pre-grouping: Lancashire and Yorkshire Railway
- Post-grouping: London, Midland and Scottish Railway

Key dates
- 1850 to 1872: 1st Platform
- 1872 on: Station re-sited 250m east
- 10 September 1962: Closed to passengers
Location

Chatburn railway station once served the small village of Chatburn in Lancashire, England.

== History ==
The original single line opened in June 1850 and terminated at a platform to the rear of the Pendle Hotel. Some of the first platform stone work is still in situ (as of July 2016). The station west of Clitheroe road was opened in 1872 by the Lancashire and Yorkshire Railway and until 1879, was at the end of the line from Blackburn. There was at one stage a turntable, it was situated east of Clitheroe road on the flat ground in the area of the existing station building.

The line was doubled up from 1872 to 1874, and work on the line onwards towards Gisburn and Hellifield began in 1874. Initially it opened to Gisburn in June 1879, and was running to Helifield twelve months later. The bigger replacement station east of Clitheroe Road closed to passengers after ninety years, shortly before the publication of the Beeching Report.

Chatburn station had its own goods depot, with multiple sidings and a large goods shed. The depot is now Pendle Trading Estate; the large goods shed is used as a vehicle repair shop. There was a crane, a weighing machine and a signal box, which would be shared with Dixon Robinson's Bold Venture Lime Works, with points on the opposite side of the main line.

The main station building has been used as storage and stables since the mid-1960s, and the second brick built station master's house, on approach to station building, has been in private hands from the same time. The original Victorian station masters house is still in situation at the side of the Clitheroe road, and was used as the weighbridge and offices for the Bold Venture Lime Works for many years, but was reoccupied in 1995 by a local Computer business and remains in use to this day.

== Services ==
Preceding station	Historical railways	Following station
Rimington; Line open, station closed	Lancashire and Yorkshire Railway; Blackburn Railway	Clitheroe; Line and station open
