= Listed buildings in Barley-with-Wheatley Booth =

Barley-with-Wheatley Booth is a civil parish in Pendle, Lancashire, England. It contains eight listed buildings that are recorded in the National Heritage List for England. All of the listed buildings are designated at Grade II, the lowest of the three grades, which is applied to "buildings of national importance and special interest". The parish contains the village of Barley, and is otherwise rural. All the listed buildings are houses, farmhouses or farm buildings.

== Buildings ==
Name and location	Photograph	Date	Notes
Whitehough House; 53.85924°N 2.25746°W		1593	Originally a hall with a cross-wing that was rebuilt in the 17th century, and with later extensions. It is in stone, and has mullioned windows and gables. On the front are three tablets with a long inscription.
Darney's Cottage; 53.86478°N 2.27284°W		c. 1600	A stone cottage with a stone-slate roof in two storeys. The doorway has a chamfered lintel, and the windows were originally mullioned. In the ground floor is a three-light window with arched heads.
Barn adjoining Whittakers Cottage; 53.85928°N 2.25824°W	—	Early 17th century (possible)	Part of the barn originated as a house. It is in stone with a stone-slate roof. The windows are mullioned.
Barley Green House; 53.85776°N 2.27147°W		1796	Originally a farmhouse, it was later divided into three dwellings. It is in stone with a stone-slate roof, three storeys, and a symmetrical three-bay front. Above the central doorway is an inscribed pediment, and the windows are sashes. There are later extensions on both sides.
Whittakers Cottage; 53.85935°N 2.25804°W		Late 17th to early 18th century	The stone cottage has a stone-slate roof and it contains earlier material. It has large quoins, and a chamfered doorway. At the rear is a moulded doorway with a Tudor arched head. The windows are modern. Inside is a 16th-century cruck truss.
Whitehough Cottages; 53.85947°N 2.25783°W		Early 18th century	A terrace of four stone cottages with a stone-slate roof. The doorways have plain surrounds, and the windows have been altered. On the front is a dated tablet.
Lower Black Moss Farmhouse and barn 53.87237°N 2.25927°W		18th century	The farmhouse and barn are in stone with a stone-slate roof. The house has two storeys, mullioned windows, and a central doorway with a peaked hood. The barn is to the right.
Wilkinson's Farmhouse; 53.86048°N 2.27389°W	—	18th century	A stone house with a stone-slate roof in two storeys. The windows are mullioned and contain sashes, and the doorway has a plain surround.
