= Listed buildings in Chatburn =

Chatburn is a civil parish in Ribble Valley, Lancashire, England. It contains six listed buildings that are recorded in the National Heritage List for England. Of these, one is at Grade II*, the middle grade, and the others are at Grade II, the lowest grade. The parish contains the village of Chatburn and surrounding countryside. The listed buildings consist of houses, farmhouses, and a church.

== Key ==
Grade	Criteria
II*	Particularly important buildings of more than special interest
II	Buildings of national importance and special interest

== Buildings ==
Name and location	Photograph	Date	Notes	Grade
6 Downham Road; 53.89287°N 2.35191°W		17th century	A limestone house with sandstone dressings and a slate roof, in two storeys and two bays. The windows are mullioned and transomed, and the central doorway has a chamfered surround and a Tudor arched head. On the right side is a massive projecting chimney stack.	II
Crow Trees Farmhouse; 53.89181°N 2.35491°W	—	Late 17th century	The house is in pebbledashed stone with a slate roof, and a south front of three storeys and three bays. Behind the main range are two parallel adjoining wings. Most of the windows are mullioned and contain sashes. The doorway has a plain surround, moulded imposts, and a cornice.	II
Laneside Farmhouse; 53.90270°N 2.34657°W		1677	The house is in limestone with sandstone dressings and a stone-slate roof. It has two storeys with attics, and contains mullioned windows. There is a central porch with a three-light stepped window and an attic window. The outer doorway is moulded and has a shaped inscribed lintel, and the inner doorway has a chamfered surround.	II*
Manor House Cottage and barn 53.89268°N 2.35256°W		Late 18th century	The building has been converted into one house. It is in limestone with sandstone dressings and a stone-slate roof, and has three storeys. The house has two bays with the former barn to the right. The windows are mullioned, and the doorway has a plain surround. In the upper floor of the former barn is a circular pitching hole.	II
55 and 57 Downham Road; 53.89384°N 2.34711°W	—	c. 1800	A pair of limestone houses with sandstone dressings and a stone-slate roof. They have two storeys, and each house has one bay. The windows are mullioned, and some contain sashes. The doorways, on the right of each bay, have plain surrounds.	II
Christ Church; 53.89415°N 2.35158°W		1837–38	The church was designed by Edmund Sharpe, and the aisles and chancel were added in 1882 by Frederick Robinson. It is in limestone with sandstone dressings and a slate roof, and is in Romanesque Revival style. The church consists of a nave, a south porch, three transeptal gables forming aisles, a chancel with a semicircular apse, and a west steeple. The steeple consists of a three-stage tower and a broach spire.	II
