= Listed buildings in Blacko =

Blacko is a civil parish in Pendle, Lancashire, England. It contains twelve listed buildings that are recorded in the National Heritage List for England. All of the listed buildings are designated at Grade II, the lowest of the three grades, which is applied to "buildings of national importance and special interest". The parish contains the village of Blacko, and is otherwise rural. Most of the listed buildings are houses, farmhouses, or farm buildings. The Leeds and Liverpool Canal passes through the parish, and a bridge crossing it is listed. The other listed buildings consist of a public house, a war memorial, and a tower standing in a prominent position on a hill.

== Buildings ==
Name and location	Photograph	Date	Notes
Barn, Great Stonedge Farm; 53.86640°N 2.20928°W	—	17th century (or earlier)	An aisled barn, the internal structure of which is entirely timber-framed. It has been encased in sandstone, and has a stone-slate roof. The barn is in a single storey with a north front of five bays and has a shallow porch. The openings include doorways, windows, and ventilation slits, some of which have been blocked.
Admergill Hall; 53.87761°N 2.22261°W		17th century	A house that originated as three cottages. It is in stone with a stone-slate roof, and has two storeys. There are two doorways, one plain, and one with a chamfered lintel. Most of the windows are mullioned.
Blacko Laithe Farmhouse; 53.87300°N 2.22356°W	—	17th century	A stone house with a stone-slate roof in two storeys. Some of the windows are mullioned, and others are sashes. The central doorway has a plain surround, and there is a gabled porch to the right.
East Stone Edge and East Stone Edge Cottage; 53.86556°N 2.20489°W	—	17th century	Originally one house, later divided into two dwellings. The right bay and the rear elevation date from the 18th century. The building is in stone with a stone-slate roof, and has two storeys. Some of the windows are mullioned and others are sashes. There is a gabled porch and a doorway with a three-centred arch, above which is a datestone.
Lower Wheathead Farmhouse; 53.87270°N 2.23591°W	—	Late 17th century (probable)	The house has been divided into two dwellings. It is in stone with a stone-slate roof and has two storeys. The building has an L-shaped plan consisting of a main block and a gabled wing to the left. some of the windows have been replaced, but all the original windows have mullions. The doorways have plain surrounds.
Cross Gaits Inn; 53.86834°N 2.20471°W		1736	A public house in stone with a stone-slate roof. It has two storeys and three bays. The ground floor windows are modern, and those in the upper floor are mullioned. Seven steps lead up to a doorway with a square head, above which is a plaque with an inscription and the date.
Greystone Farmhouse and barn 53.88879°N 2.21844°W	—	Late 18th century	The farmhouse and barn are in stone and have a stone-slate roof. The windows and door are in Gothic style, and the door has a fanlight. The attached barn, the garden wall, the cast iron railings, the gate, and the stone gate piers are included in the listing.
Higher Admergill Farmhouse; 53.87905°N 2.22619°W	—	Late 18th century	The house is in stone with a stone-slate roof and has two storeys. The windows in the ground floor are sashes, and above they are mullioned. The doorway has a peaked hood.
Manor House; 53.87106°N 2.22209°W	—	Late 18th century	A stone house with a stone-slate roof in two storeys with a symmetrical three-bay front. The windows are sashes, and the central doorway has a semicircular head, a fanlight, and a broken pediment carried on pilasters.
Wanless Bridge; 53.86670°N 2.19556°W		1794	The bridge carries a road across the Leeds and Liverpool Canal. It is in stone, and consists of a single elliptical arch with rusticated voussoirs. The bridge has a solid coped parapet with curved abutments ending in piers.
Blacko (or Stansfield) Tower; 53.87577°N 2.21502°W		1890	The tower is a folly about 30 feet (9.1 m) high. It is circular, in stone, and at the top are battlements. Two steps lead up to a plain doorway, and inside the tower is a spiral staircase leading up to an observation platform.
War memorial 53.87086°N 2.21658°W	—	1921	The war memorial, designed by Darcy Braddell, is in a roadside enclosure. It is in stone, and consists of an obelisk on a square pedestal on a tapering plinth. Under it is a rusticated platform on a step. On three sides of the obelisk are carvings including crosses and wreaths, and on the pedestal are inscriptions and the names of those lost in the two World Wars.
