= Ogden Reservoirs =

Reservoirs in Lancashire, England

Upper and Lower Ogden Reservoirs
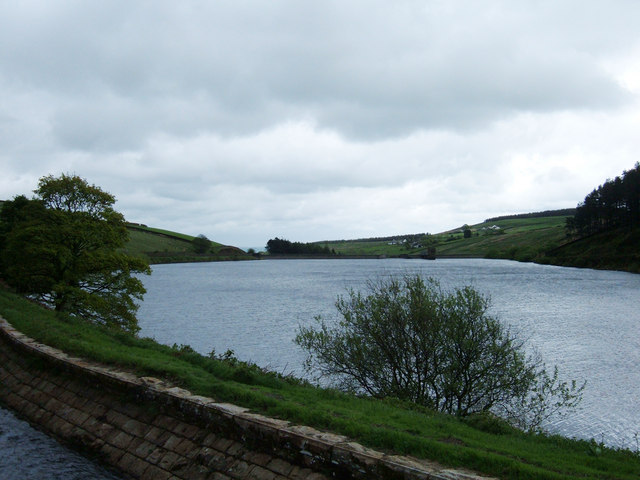
- View looking east across lower reservoir

- Location in Pendle Borough Location in Lancashire
- Location: Lancashire, England
- Coordinates: 53°51′21″N 2°16′52″W
- Built: 1906 and 1914
- Surface area: 2.84 and 8.55 ha (7.0 and 21.1 acres)
- Max. depth: 17.9 and 18 m (59 and 59 ft)
- Water volume: 247,755 and 715,989 m^{3} (200.858 and 580.462 acre⋅ft)

Upper and Lower Ogden Reservoirs are half a mile to the west of the village of Barley, in the Borough of Pendle, Lancashire, England. Constructed in the early 20th century, they supply drinking water to the town of Nelson. Today they are operated by United Utilities.

== History ==
Both reservoirs were built for the Nelson Corporation Waterworks as later parts of a larger scheme that also included the construction of the nearby Black Moss Reservoirs. An act of Parliament was obtained for the project in the late 1880s. Initially water was collected from the river here and purified through filter beds, which began operation in 1892.

The Upper Ogden was completed in 1906 and the Lower Ogden in 1914. The upper reservoir has a surface area of 2.84 hectares (7.0 acres), is 17.9 metres (59 ft) deep and can hold 247,755 cubic metres (54.50 million imperial gallons; 247.8 million litres). The lower reservoir is larger, with a surface area of 8.55 hectares (21.1 acres), a depth of 18 metres (59 ft) and a capacity of 715,989 cubic metres (157.5 million imperial gallons; 716.0 million litres).

== Geology and geography ==
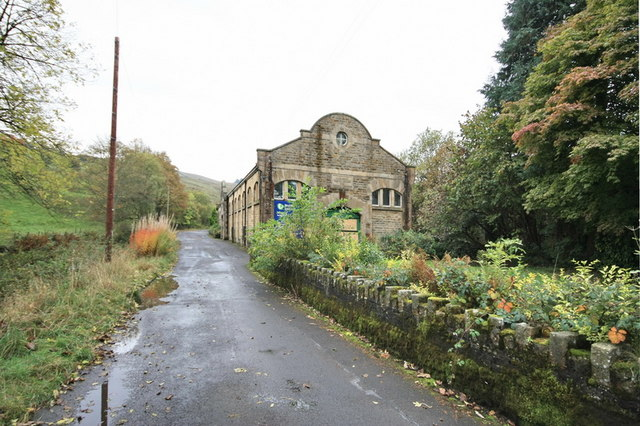
Former Barley Water Works, now converted into private dwellings

The area's central geological feature is a north-westerly facing mounting escarpment, which extends between Whalley and the Aire Gap. It reaches its highest point at Pendle Hill, directly north of the reservoirs. On the southern side of the valley, low gritstone crags are visible on parts of the hillside.

Pendle Water, a tributary of the Lancashire Calder, has its source on the summit plateau of Pendle Hill and flows through Ogden Clough collecting the Boar Clough stream before supplying the reservoirs with water.

Three forests covering a total of more than 23 hectares (57 acres) can be found close to the reservoirs. Fell Wood, which is the largest, was planted in 1931 and contains Norway Spruce (Picea abies), Sitka Spruce (Picea sitchensis), Scots Pine (Pinus sylvestris) and European Larch (Larix decidua). Blue Wood, which was originally planted in 1935 with Scots Pine, Sitka Spruce and Larch was felled and replanted in 1981. The third forest: Buttock Plantation, was planted in 1935 with Sitka Spruce and Larch.
