= Barley-with-Wheatley Booth =

Civil parish in Lancashire, England

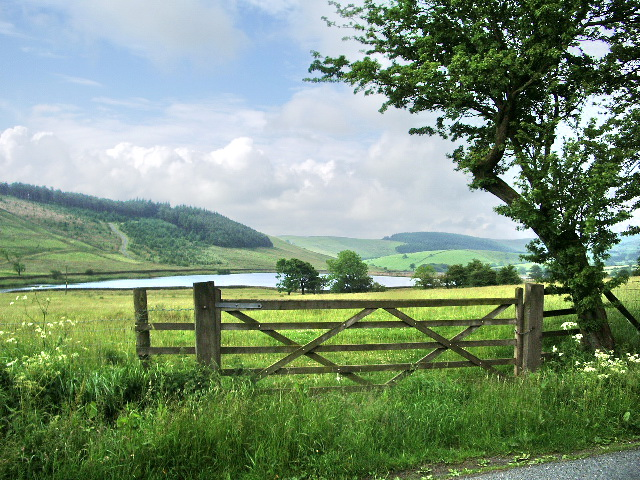
- Upper Black Moss Reservoir

- Location in Pendle Borough Location in the Forest of Bowland AONB Location within Lancashire
- Population: 298 (2011)
- OS grid reference: SD8240
- Civil parish: Barley-with-Wheatley Booth
- District: Pendle
- Shire county: Lancashire
- Region: North West
- Country: England
- Sovereign state: United Kingdom
- Post town: BURNLEY
- Postcode district: BB12
- Dialling code: 01282
- Police: Lancashire
- Fire: Lancashire
- Ambulance: North West
- UK Parliament: Pendle and Clitheroe

Barley-with-Wheatley Booth is a civil parish in the Pendle district of Lancashire, England. It has a population of 298, and contains the village of Barley and the hamlet of White Hough or Whitehough (53.859°N 2.257°W). To the west of Barley is Pendle Hill; its summit, at 557 metres (1,827 ft), is within the parish.

The parish adjoins the Pendle parishes of Blacko, Roughlee Booth and Goldshaw Booth and the Ribble Valley parishes of Sabden, Mearley, Worston, Downham and Twiston. It is part of the Forest of Bowland Area of Outstanding Natural Beauty (AONB).

Barley-with-Wheatley Booth was once a township in the ancient parish of Whalley. This became a civil parish in 1866, forming part of the Burnley Rural District from 1894.

Along with Higham-with-West Close Booth, Goldshaw Booth and Roughlee Booth, the parish forms the Higham with Pendleside ward of Pendle Borough Council.

According to the United Kingdom Census 2011, the parish has a population of 298, an increase from 271 in the 2001 census.

== Media gallery ==
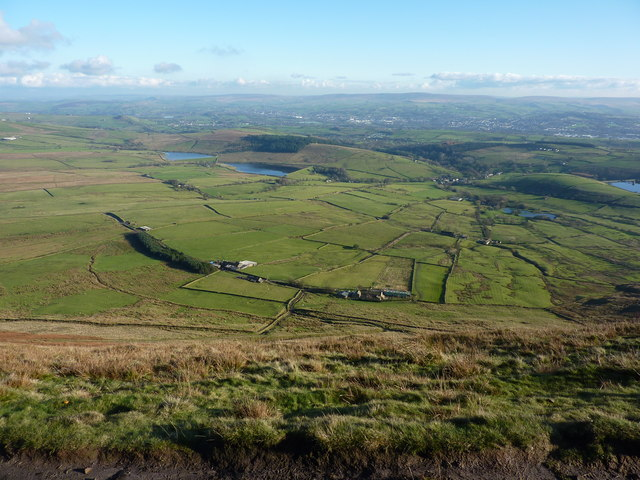
View over the parish from Pendle Hill

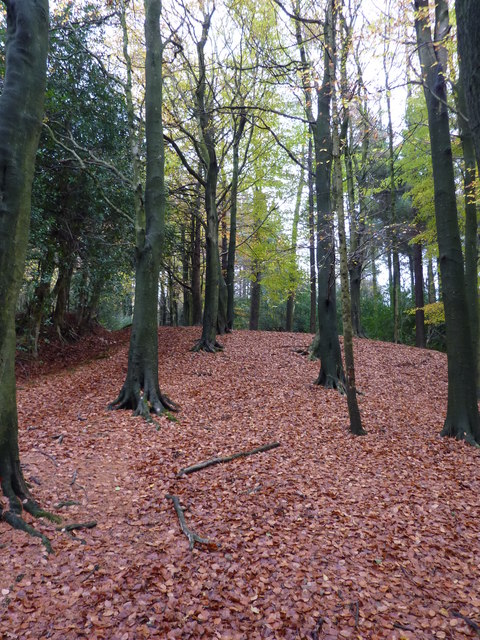
Autumn near White Hough

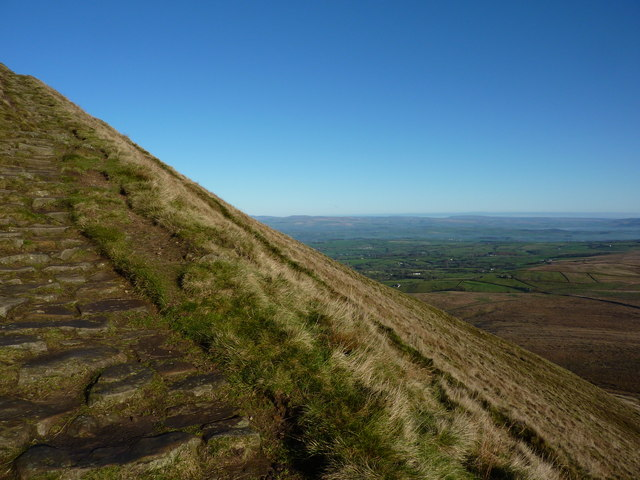
Assending Pendle on the footpath from Barley

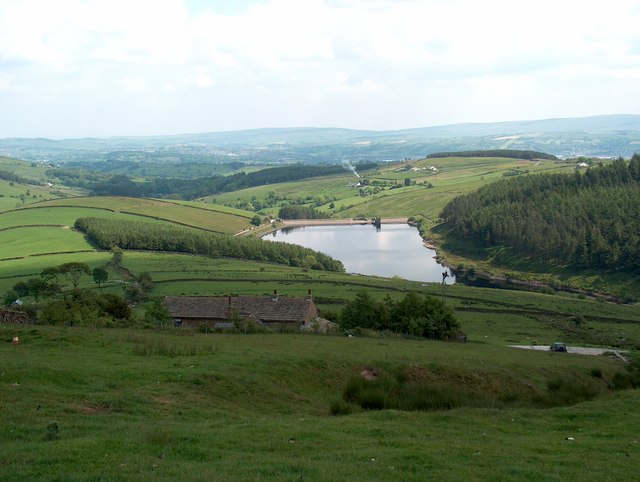
Lower Ogden Reservoir from Buttock Farm

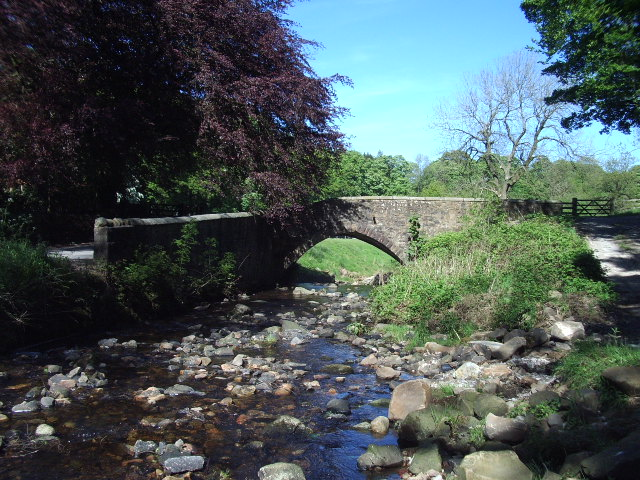
Bridge over White Hough Water

== See also ==
- Listed buildings in Barley-with-Wheatley Booth
