= Blacko and Higherford =

- Shown within Pendle
- Area: 8.67 km^{2} (3.35 sq mi)
- Population: 1,800 (2011)
  - Density: 208/km^{2} (540/sq mi)
- District: Pendle
- Ceremonial county: Lancashire
- Region: North West
- Country: England
- Sovereign state: United Kingdom
- UK Parliament: Pendle and Clitheroe
- Councillors: Shelagh Derwent (Conservative)

Blacko and Higherford is one of the 20 electoral wards that form the Parliamentary constituency of Pendle, Lancashire, England. The ward returns one councillor to represent the villages of Blacko and Higherford, as well as several surrounding hamlets, on Pendle Borough Council. As of the May 2011 Council election, Barrowford had an electorate of 1,480.

== Demographics ==
Blacko and Higherford has an older-than-average population compared to both Pendle and England, with a mean age of 44.6 years. The ward has an almost exclusively white populace, and 82.7 per cent of residents identify themselves as Christian.

== Election results ==
Year elected	Councillor	Majority	%
2011	Shelagh Derwent	435	59.5
