= Twiston =

Village in Lancashire, England

Coordinates: 53.8907°N 2.2851°W

- Shown within Ribble Valley Location within Lancashire
- Population: 64 (2001 Census)
- OS grid reference: SD813438
- Civil parish: Twiston
- District: Ribble Valley
- Shire county: Lancashire
- Region: North West
- Country: England
- Sovereign state: United Kingdom
- Post town: CLITHEROE
- Postcode district: BB7
- Dialling code: 01200
- Police: Lancashire
- Fire: Lancashire
- Ambulance: North West
- UK Parliament: Ribble Valley

Twiston is a village and a civil parish in the Ribble Valley District, in the English county of Lancashire. It is near the town of Clitheroe and the village of Downham (in whose parish the population of Twiston is now included). The parish is part of the Forest of Bowland Area of Outstanding Natural Beauty (AONB). It adjoins the Ribble Valley parishes of Downham and Rimington, and the Pendle parish of Barley-with-Wheatley Booth.

Twiston was once a township in the ancient parish of Whalley. This became a civil parish in 1866, forming part of the Clitheroe Rural District from 1894 till 1974.

Along with Chatburn and Downham, the parish makes up the Chatburn ward of Ribble Valley Borough Council.

== Media gallery ==
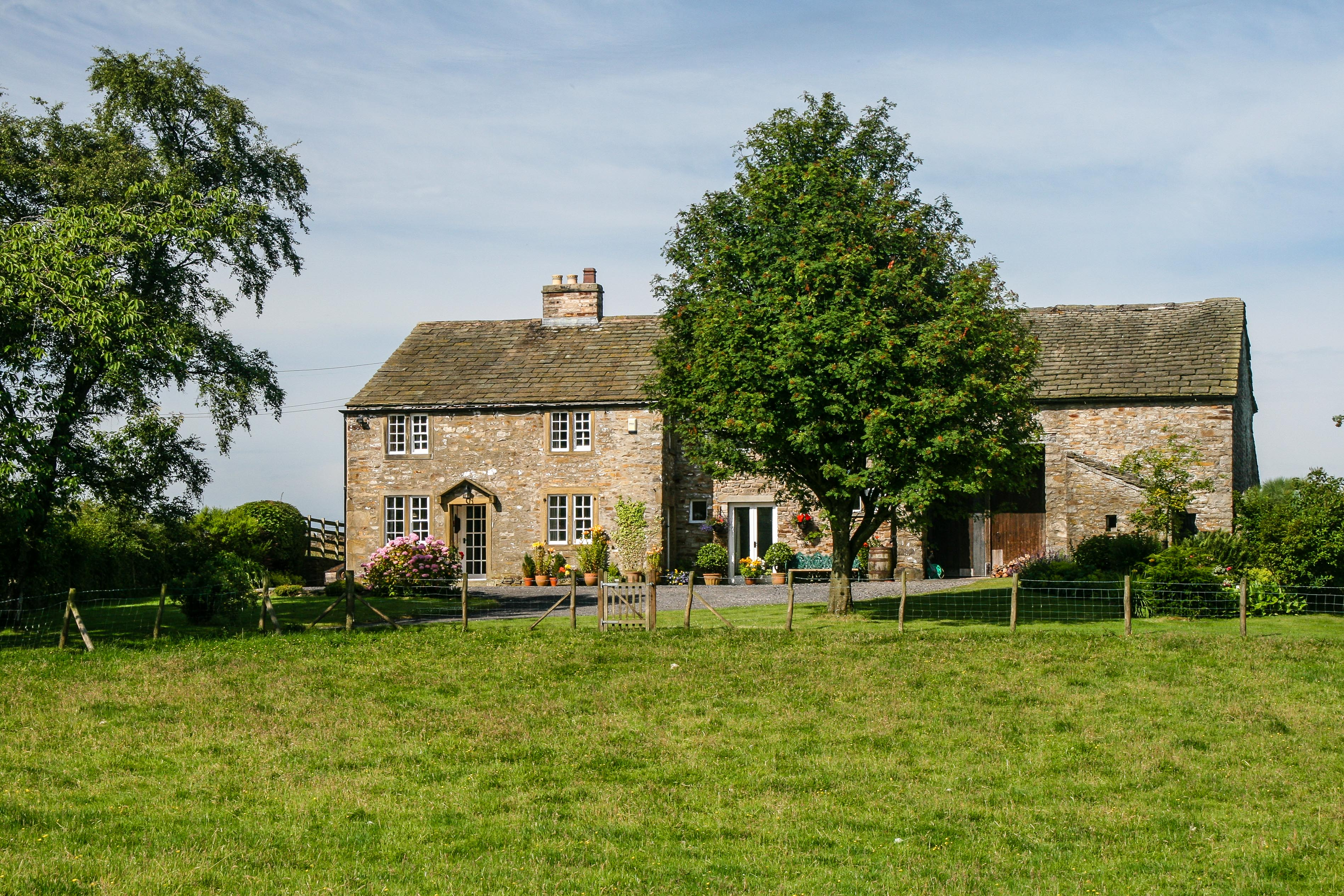
Hill Top Farmhouse.

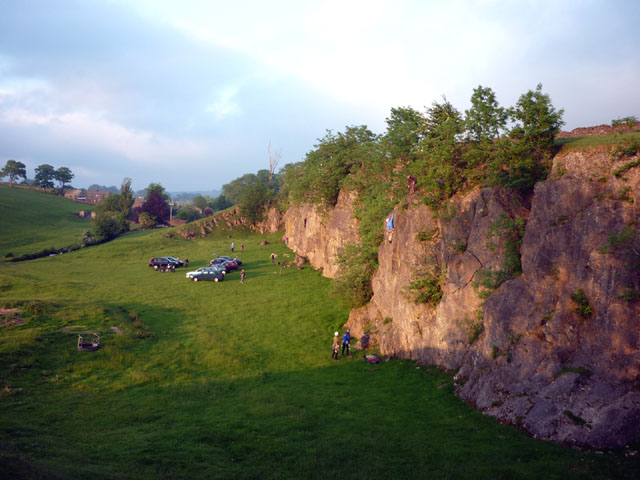
Witches Quarry.

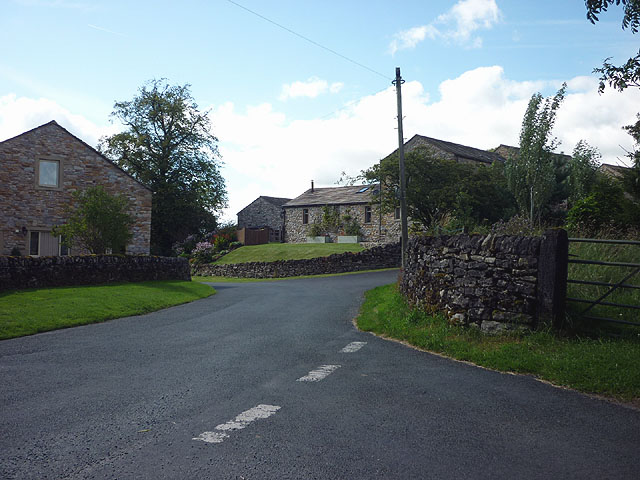
Lower Gate.

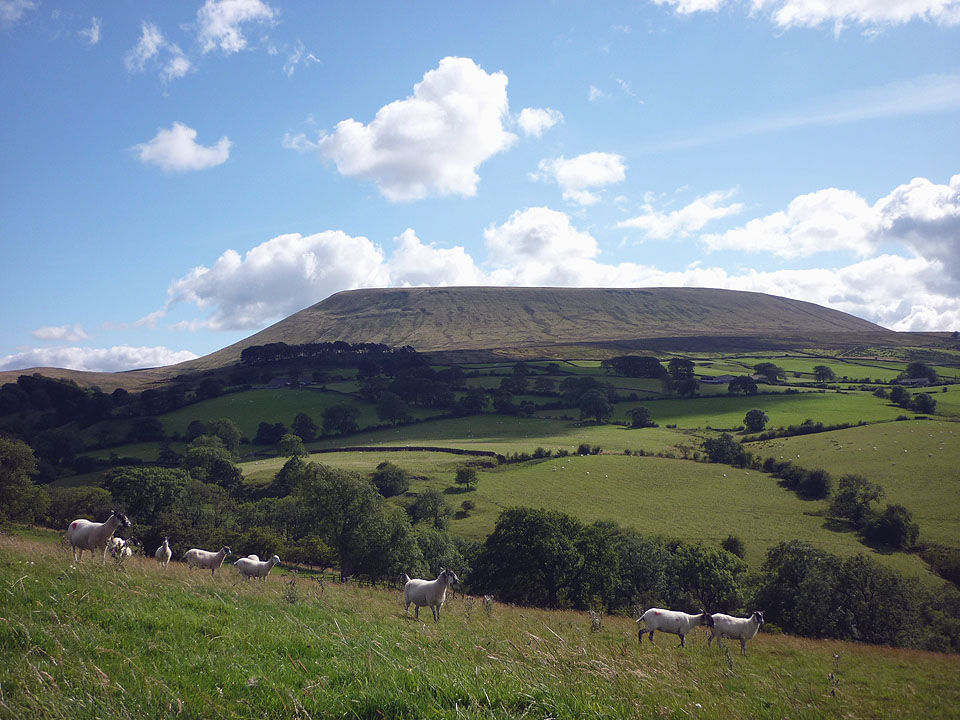
Pendle Hill from the hillside above Twiston Beck.

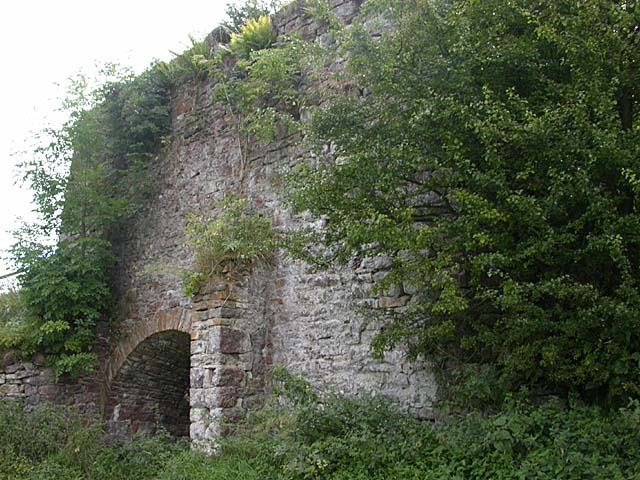
Old Lime kiln.

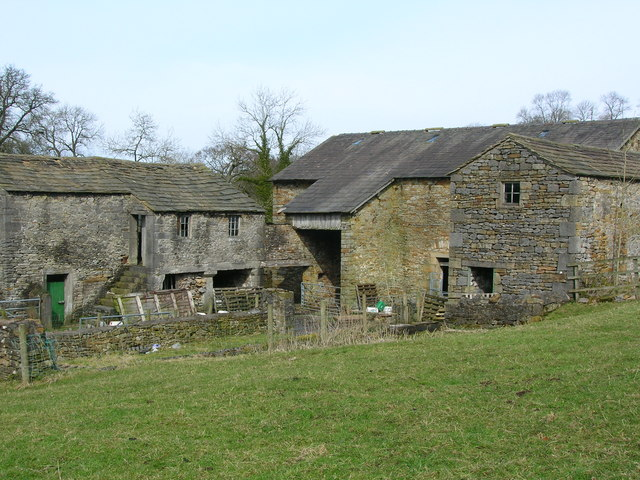
Site of the former Twiston Mill.

== See also ==
- Listed buildings in Twiston
