= Listed buildings in Roughlee Booth =

Roughlee Booth is a civil parish in Pendle, Lancashire, England. It contains nine listed buildings that are recorded in the National Heritage List for England. All of the listed buildings are designated at Grade II, the lowest of the three grades, which is applied to "buildings of national importance and special interest". Apart from the village of Roughlee, the parish is entirely rural. All the listed buildings are houses, farmhouses, and farm buildings.

== Buildings ==
Name and location	Photograph	Date	Notes
Roughlee Old Hall; 53.85984°N 2.23767°W		Late 16th century	A stone house with a stone-slate roof, it has an H-shaped plan consisting of a hall and two gabled cross wings. The left cross wing has been altered and contains sash windows and a doorway. In the rest of the house the windows are mullioned with round heads. In the centre of the front are two doorways with plain surrounds. There is an inscribed stone in the left gable.
Dam Head Farmhouse and barn 53.85593°N 2.24689°W	—	17th century	The house and barn are in stone with a stone-slate roof. The house has two storeys and a lean-to extension to the right. The windows are mullioned, but many mullions have been removed, and the doorway has a deep chamfered lintel. The barn to the left is higher and contains an irregular window and small square ventilation openings.
Hollin Top Farmhouse; 53.86555°N 2.24176°W	—	17th century	A stone house with s stone-slate roof in two storeys. There is a porch on the left gable end, the doorway has a plain surround, and the windows are mullioned.
Yew Tree Cottage; 53.85856°N 2.24060°W	—	Late 17th or early 18th century	A rendered stone cottage with a stone-slate roof in two storeys. One of the windows is mullioned and has a hood mould, and the doorway has a plain surround.
Dimpenley Top Farmhouse; 53.84704°N 2.26226°W	—	Early 18th century (probable)	The farmhouse is in rendered stone with a stone-slate roof, and has two storeys. The windows are mullioned, although some mullions have been lost.
Nabs House; 53.84889°N 2.25830°W	—	1756	A stone house with a stone-slate roof in two storeys. The windows are mullioned and transomed, and at the rear is a six-light stair window. On the front is a modern porch that has a doorway with pilasters, a cornice, and a frieze. Above the doorway is a niche containing a datestone.
Fern Cottage, Lynwood, Waterfall Cottage, Willow Cottage, Glen View, and Rose Cottage; 53.85661°N 2.24420°W		Late 18th century	A row of six stone cottages with a stone-slate roof. They have two storeys, and the windows are mullioned with sashes, those in the ground floor being stepped. The doorways have plain surrounds.
Spen Barn Farmhouse; 53.84811°N 2.25951°W	—	Late 18th century	The house is in stone with a slate roof, in two storeys with a symmetrical front. The windows contain replacement mullions. At the front is a gabled porch, with an original mullion used as a drip mould. At the rear is a mullioned and transomed stair window.
Thorneyholme Hall; 53.85595°N 2.25147°W		Late 18th century	A house later divided into two dwellings, in stone with a roof partly of slate, and partly of stone-slate. It has three storeys and a symmetrical three-bay front with mullioned windows. The doorway has moulded imposts, a round arch with a keystone, and a fanlight. At the rear are sash windows and a round-headed stair window. There is a two-storey wing to the right.
