= Tommy Trafford =

British comedian (1927–1993)

Tommy Trafford (30 December 1927 – 20 March 1993) was a Lancashire comedian and a noted pantomime dame.

He lived his early life in Blacko, near Nelson, where he performed in church productions alongside Jimmy Clitheroe, "The Clitheroe Kid", with whom he went to school. Tommy owned a traditional Blackpool guest house, as did many performers, which gave him the experience to run a country hotel and restaurant for Jimmy during a temporary 'retirement' from Showbiz. Of the many routines and characters that Tommy portrayed, his best known routine was a homage to Norman Evans’ ‘Over the Garden Wall’ sketch as the larger-than-life Fanny Fairbottom. Norman's widow, on seeing Tommy perform this on television said it was the best she had seen. He appeared on playbills as ‘Tommy Trafford - Laughs from Lancs’. In later life he specialised in playing pantomime dames (harking back to Norman Evans), putting on annual Christmas pantomimes at Southport between the 1960s and 1980s, for which he earned the sobriquet ‘Mr Southport’. With his business partner and fellow actor, singer and dancer Ronnie Parnell he also ran a theatrical costume hire business as well as jointly producing summer shows and old time music hall.
