= Listed buildings in Twiston =

Twiston is a civil parish in Ribble Valley, Lancashire, England. It contains six listed buildings that are recorded in the National Heritage List for England. All of the listed buildings are designated at Grade II, the lowest of the three grades, which is applied to "buildings of national importance and special interest". The parish contains the village of Twiston, and is otherwise rural. All the listed buildings are houses, or farmhouses and farm buildings.

== Buildings ==
Name and location	Photograph	Date	Notes
Twiston Manor House; 53.89139°N 2.28476°W	—	1719	A sandstone house with a stone-slate roof, in two storeys and two bays. The four-light windows have chamfered surrounds and mullions. The central doorway has an architrave, a pulvinated frieze, and a cornice with the date inscribed beneath it.
Hill Foot Cottages; 53.89129°N 2.28712°W	—	Late 18th century	A row of three stone houses with quoins and a stone-slate roof. Each cottage has one bay. The windows have three stepped lights and mullions, and the doorways have plain surrounds, and each has an open moulded pediment on shaped brackets.
Lower Gate Farmhouse; 53.89598°N 2.28880°W	—	Late 18th century	The house is in sandstone with a slate roof, and has two storeys and four bays. There is one sash window, the other windows having three lights and mullions. The doorway has a plain surround and a moulded open pediment on shaped brackets.
Red Syke Gate; 53.88241°N 2.28162°W		Late 18th century	A rendered house with a stone-slate roof in two storeys. On the front facing the road are two wide gabled porches, each containing a doorway with a plain surround, the doorway on the right having an inscribed lintel. Most of the windows are mullioned, and have plain surrounds.
White Stones Farmhouse and farm building 53.89533°N 2.28751°W	—	Late 18th century	The house and farm building are in sandstone with a stone-slate roof. The house has two storeys and two bays. The windows have plain surrounds and the mullions have been removed. The doorway also has a plain surround, and it has a hood of two pitched slates. To the left is a farm building that contains two doorways.
Hill Top; 53.89198°N 2.28778°W		Early 19th century	The house is in sandstone with a stone-slate roof, and has two storeys and two bays. The windows have plain surrounds, two lights and mullions, and the right-hand lights contain sashes. The doorway has a plain surround and a hood of two pitched slates on square brackets.
