= Higherford =

Village in Lancashire, England

Coordinates: 53.860°N 2.206°W

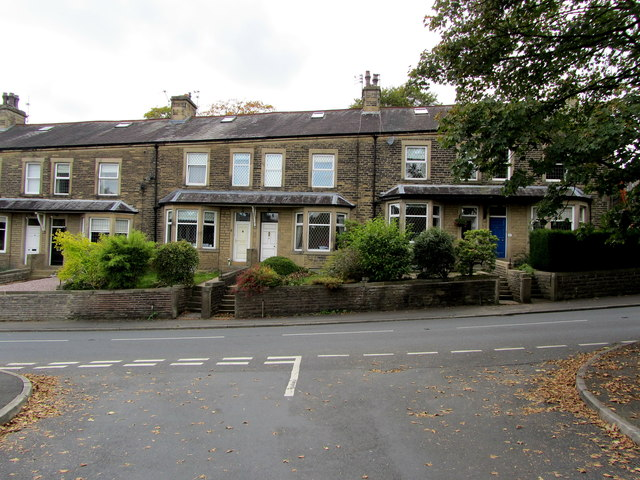
- Terraced housing on Gisburn Road

- Location in Pendle Borough Location within Lancashire
- OS grid reference: SD865405
- Civil parish: Barrowford
- District: Pendle
- Shire county: Lancashire
- Region: North West
- Country: England
- Sovereign state: United Kingdom
- Post town: NELSON
- Postcode district: BB9
- Dialling code: 01282
- Police: Lancashire
- Fire: Lancashire
- Ambulance: North West
- UK Parliament: Pendle and Clitheroe

Higherford is a village in the Pendle district of Lancashire, England.

Although it is a village in its own right and shown on maps, it is sometimes confused with its larger neighbour Barrowford. Both villages meet each other on the A682 road, which runs through them from Nelson and towards Blacko and Gisburn. It is generally accepted that the boundary between the two villages is north of the road bridge over Pendle Water.
