= Chatburn =

Village in Lancashire, England

Coordinates: 53.896°N 2.359°W

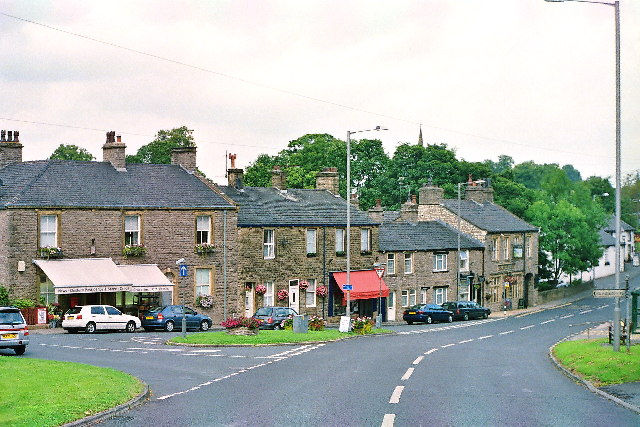
- Chatburn

- Shown within Ribble Valley Location within Lancashire
- Population: 1,102 (2011)
- OS grid reference: SD765445
- Civil parish: Chatburn
- District: Ribble Valley
- Shire county: Lancashire
- Region: North West
- Country: England
- Sovereign state: United Kingdom
- Post town: CLITHEROE
- Postcode district: BB7
- Dialling code: 01200
- Police: Lancashire
- Fire: Lancashire
- Ambulance: North West
- UK Parliament: Ribble Valley

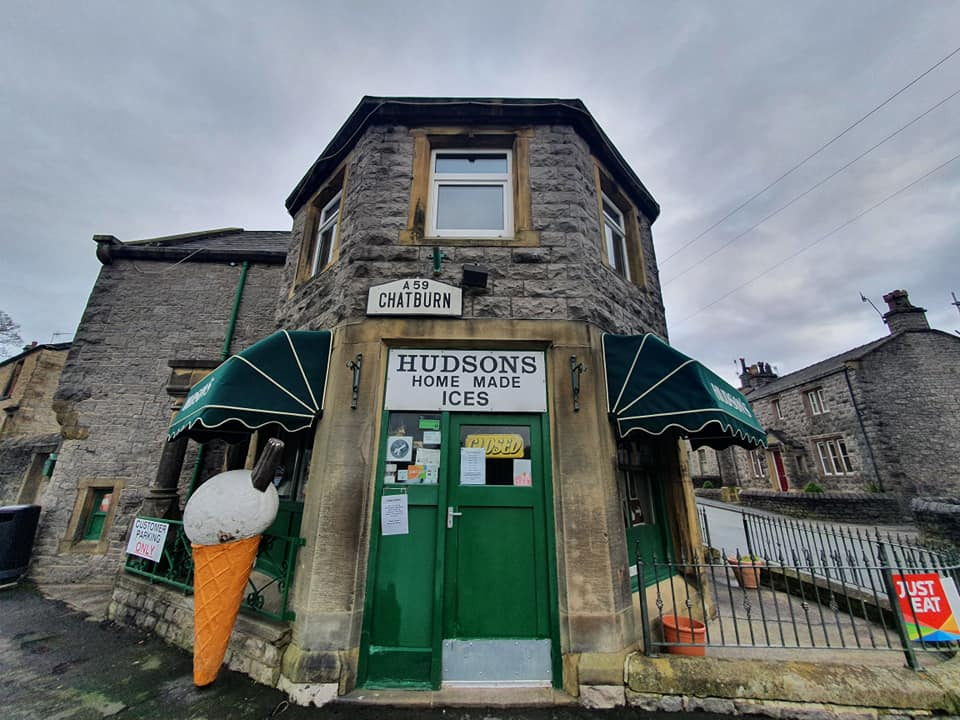
Former toll house at junction between Downham Road and Sawley Road

Chatburn is a village, civil parish and electoral ward in the Ribble Valley, East Lancashire, England. The population of the civil parish at the 2011 census was 1,102. Situated in a hollow between two ridges north-east of Clitheroe, just off the A59 road, relatively near Pendle Hill south-east of the village. Lanehead quarry is situated to the West at the termination of Chatburn Old Road. Ribble lane at 240 above sea level leads down to the River Ribble North of the village, the top of Downham road being 150 feet higher.

The parish adjoins the Ribble Valley parishes of Grindleton, Sawley, Rimington, Downham, Worston, Clitheroe and West Bradford.

== History ==
The village itself can be dated back to Anglo-Saxon times; it takes its name (as does the lowest Avenue) from one of the most distinguished characters of that time, St Chad, and having a brook (or burn) hence the name. The village sits outside the Forest of Bowland and was never considered part of the ancient Lordship of Bowland.

A feature of the village is the spire of the parish church, which was erected around 1838. The steeple was struck by lightning in 1854, but was rebuilt in the same year. Over the years Chatburn has had several mills, one had a large brick chimney, the site is now houses on both sides of Ribble Lane. Early in the 15th century there was a watermill.

Chatburn railway station was closed in 1962 before the Beeching cuts.

Bold Venture lime works, gas works and quarry provided much employment for villagers for many years, now part of Lanehead quarry located across the railway from the Pendle trading estate, the former Pendle Hotel and the opposite side of the road to the old telephone exchange building. It was owned by Dixon Robinson from 1837, he also built the Pendle Hotel and Black Bull public houses. Dixon was a major landowner and also built about 20 houses in the village. At Quarry farm, on the left of Ribble lane there were 3 limekilns, Big, Small & Farm. All 3 appear on the 1786 Yates map One was located on the very east end of Park Ave

The village also features Chatburn Post Office which was bombed during the Second World War. Chatburn Old road was the main Liverpool to Skipton road before the existing Chatburn to Clitheroe was cut in 1826/7. This then became the main A59 road, until the Clitheroe bypass & Downham road cutting was opened in about 1971.

Parts of the village and surroundings featured in the 1961 film Whistle Down the Wind starring Hayley Mills, Alan Barnes, Diane Holgate and children from Chatburn Primary School.

== Governance ==
Chatburn was once a township in the ancient parish of Whalley. This became a civil parish in 1866, forming part of the Clitheroe Rural District from 1894 till 1974.

Chatburn also gives its name to a ward of Ribble Valley Borough Council, which also includes Downham and Twiston. The ward had a population of 1,324 in 2001, falling to 1,316 in 2011. The ward elects a single councillor, who currently is Gary Scott of the Conservative Party.

== See also ==
- Listed buildings in Chatburn
- Chatburn (surname)
