= Dixon Robinson =

English lawyer, gentleman steward of the Honour of Clitheroe, and philanthropist

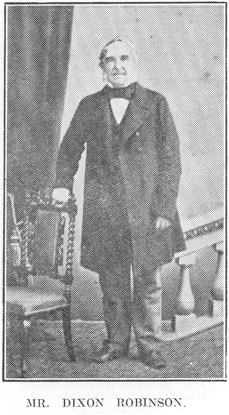
Dixon Robinson of Chatburn

Dixon Robinson (1795–1878) was an English lawyer, gentleman steward of the Honour of Clitheroe, and philanthropist in the 19th century.

== Life ==
Dixon Robinson was born on 17 June 1795 at Chatburn, Lancashire, third son of Josias Robinson (1749–1827) and Susanna Dixon (1758–1824); he attended Clitheroe Royal Grammar School.

== The Lancashire Lawyer and Steward of the Honor of Clitheroe ==
Having trained and articled as surveyor and land agent at Kirkby Lonsdale, he then adopted the profession of law, eventually becoming a partner in the firm of Carr and Robinson, solicitors, of King Street Blackburn and Clitheroe. Following the death of Mr Carr, Mr Robinson became the senior partner and was appointed by Lord Monague as the 'Gentleman Steward of the Honor of Clitheroe', a position whose residence and office was Clitheroe Castle. This evolved into Robinson and Sons, with Dixon's children Arthur and Henry. The firm's name continued through further generations, the business being carried on through Arthur's sons Frederick Dixon Robinson and Thomas Chambers Robinson. Colonel Geoffrey Robinson, noted in trade directories in 1951, was the fourth generation to work in the firm, being the great-grandson of Dixon. The office and title of Steward of the Honour was held by five different Robinsons from 1836 until 1960 (see Honour of Clitheroe). The firm continued until at least 1966 but appears no longer to be operating with Robinson connections. Deposits by the firm at Lancashire Record Office include Peart-Robinson estate records, concerning the affairs of Dixon's brother, William Robinson and his wife Jane Peart of Settle.

Other positions he held were, Steward of the manor of Gisbourne, Steward for The forest and liberty of Bowland for the Townley family, the fee of Waddington for Lady Ramsden and solicitor for Lord Ribblesdale.

He was both the secretary and solicitor to the Blackburn, Darwen and Bolton Railway.

Dixon was also Clerk to the Trustees of the turnpike road from Bury through Haslingden to Blackburn & Whalley.

== Family life ==
Dixon first married Margaret White in Blackburn by whom he had a son Josias, they both died within a year. Dixon Robinson married secondly Matilda Ingram, sister of the Rev Robert Ingram, on 1 November 1828 at Kegworth. Dixon and his family lived at Clitheroe Castle to his death in 1878, having moved to the Castle in 1836.

Dixon and Matilda had seven sons and five daughters, seven of whom survived to adulthood:

- Arthur Ingram, born 1832, died 1912, solicitor and Gentleman Steward of the Honor of Clitheroe, admitted as a solicitor in 1854.
- Frederick Josias, born 1833, died 1892, architect of Derby
- George born 1835, died 1907, bank manager and director of the Craven Bank at Skipton
- Henry John, born 1845, died 1913, solicitor, coroner for Blackburn, of Little Harwood Hall
- Susannah Catharine, born 1839, died 1911, married (1861) Dr William Edward Musson (1831 - 1917) of Clitheroe and had son Maj. Gen. Arthur Ingram Musson (1877 - 1961)
- Matilda Jane (1841–1916) married the brewer Norman Watney (1834–1911) who built Valence House now Valence School outside Westerham, Kent.
- Margaret Elizabeth, born 1844, died 1897, of The Manor House, Clitheroe

Others: Matilda 1829, William Dixon 1831, Robert Acklom 1837, Robert 1847 and Lucy 1849,

Dixon Robinson died on 21 July 1878 at Clitheroe, Lancashire, following a couple of strokes, the first being in February of that year. On Wednesday 24 July, the funeral cortége of many carriages, travelled from Clitheroe Castle to Blackburn Parish Church, prior to interment in the crypt.

== Philanthropic and civic duty ==
Christ Church, Chatburn was partly paid for by Dixon Robinson and his older brother, William. Extensions to the church in 1882–83 were designed by his son, Frederick Josias Robinson. The first perpetual curacy was given to his brother-in-law Rev Robert Ingram. There are many Ingram and Robinson memorials in the church.

He served as a colonel in the East Lancashire Volunteers, being first commissioned as a lieutenant in the local militia on 17 December 1813.

During the Cotton riots he was clerk to the magistrates and was much involved with keeping the peace. As shown in contemporary reports.

Monday 24 April 1826 a mass meeting of weavers was held on Enfield Moor, The mob then started out for Blackburn, At Jubilee Mill, Simeon Wright attacked the Reverend Noble, hitting him with a large stick, this was taken from him by the Magistrates' Clerk Dixon Robinson.

"Dixon Robinson was there (Clithereoe) & returned with us to Chatburne. His exertions during the riots in Lancashire & since have rather thired ?[tired] him – for upwards of a week he scarce had his cloaths off – and since has had little rest, for he has been up two or three nights each week with the magistrates & military taking up the most active of the rioters and which can only be done in the night, as during the day they are upon the alert and have scouts to give them intelligence of the approach of the military without whom the civil power has no chance of contending with them."

Dixon Robinson took a keen interest in the Blackburn Gasworks, being an original subscriber and acted as clerk throughout its whole existence, in addition he supported the old Blackburn police force, the King Street theatre and assembly rooms. He was also a solicitor of the Bolton Darwen Blackburn and West Yorkshire Railway,

Examples of his caring and Philanthropic nature can be seen in his support of local charitable institutions, in 1824 he was one of the founding trustees of The Blackburn Dispensary and Infirmary. He subscribed £10 10s to The Royal Patriotic Fund in 1854, he donated 5 tons of "best Clitheroe lime" to Blackburn Council "for whitewashing the dwellings of the poor & narrow alleys....to prevent the plague of epidemic disease". An annual subscriber to the Blackburn & East Lancashire Infirmary, in 1876 he donated £5 5s, which was the 3rd highest amount that year.

He was the treasurer of Blackburn Grammar School in 1819.

== Landowner and limeburner ==
Dixon Robinson is listed as a Lime Burner at Bold Venture Chatburn in all the Slaters Directories from 1848 to 1871. The Bold Venture Kiln, Quarry and Limeworks were purchased by Dixon in 1836/7. He presumably built the cottages and Quarry House, dated 1850 at Bold Venture Chatburn. The quarry and works were served by sidings from the new railway (now the Ribble Valley Line), which opened in the 3rd week of June 1850. It was around this time that Dixon Robinson built what is now the Pendle Hotel which was advertised to let in 1852, and 1860 He was a large land owner in both Chatburn (1858) and Clitheroe (1868) and even after his death "Principal Chatburn Landowners are the representatives of the late Dixon Robinson..." with only 2 others.

There was also a Gasworks at the Bold Venture works, which supplied both Chatburn and Downham, this was transferred by the Board of Trade to Clitheroe Corporation Gas in 1925.

The Bold Venture Lime Company Limited was still owned by the Robinson family in 1930, then under the management of Major JFM Robinson, a grandson of Dixon Robinson.
