= Joe Chadbourne =

English footballer

Personal information
- Date of birth: 1883
- Place of birth: Halifax, England
- Date of death: 1958 (aged 74–75)
- Position: Centre forward

Senior career*
Years	Team	Apps	(Gls)
1905	Bradford City	0	(0)
1905–1906	Barnsley	0	(0)
1906–1909	Heckmondwike	?	(?)
1909–1910	Burnley	9	(4)
- * Club domestic league appearances and goals

Joseph H. Chadbourne (1883–1958) was an English professional footballer who played as a centre forward. He was born in Halifax, West Riding of Yorkshire and played nine games in the Football League for Burnley, scoring four goals.
