= James H. Chadbourn =

American lawyer

James Harmon Chadbourn (born Spartanburg, South Carolina, 1905; died, Cambridge, Massachusetts, 1982) was an American legal scholar and an expert in civil procedure, Federal jurisdiction and evidence. He was a Fessenden Professor of law at Harvard University from 1963 until his retirement in 1974.

== Education ==
Chadbourn received a B.A. from The Citadel, The Military College of South Carolina in 1926.
He received an LL.B. from the University of North Carolina at Chapel Hill School of Law in 1931.

== Employment ==
Assistant Professor & ---, University of North Carolina School of Law, 19-- - 19--
Professor, University of Pennsylvania School of Law, 1940-1950
Professor, University of California at Los Angeles School of Law, 1950-1963
Visiting Professor, Harvard Law School, 1961-1963
Fessenden Professor of Law, Harvard Law School 1963-1974

== Publications ==
Books, treatises, casebooks & reports:

Chadbourn revised seven volumes (turning them into eight) of the third edition of the classic treatise John H. Wigmore, Evidence in Trials at Common Law (3d ed. 1940).

- J. Chabourn, Lynching and the Law (1933), reprinted in 2008 by the Lawbook Exchange, Ltd;
- T. Atkinson & J. Chadbourn, Cases and Other Materials on Civil Procedure (1948);
- T. Atkinson & J. Chadbourn, Introduction to Civil Procedure (1948);
- J. Chadbourn, L. Levin & P. Shuchman, Cases and Materials on Civil Procedure (2d ed. 1974) (original edition published by Chadbourn and Levin in 1961);
- R. Magill & J. Chadbourn, Cases and Civil Procedure Preface (3d ed. 1939);
- J. Chadbourn & L. Levin, Procedure Portfolio: Pleadings, Process and Appeal Papers in Facsimile (1962);
- J. Chadbourn, H. Grossman & A. Van Alstyne, California Pleading -- Civil Actions (1961);
- J. Chadbourn, A. Van Alstyne & H. Grossman, California Discovery Practice (1972);
- C. McCormick, J. Chadbourn & C. Wright, Cases and Materials on Federal Courts (6th ed. 1976) (federal courts casebook first published by McCormick and Chadbourn in 1946);
- 6 California Law Revision Commission Reports 39-45, 58-74, 133-69, 307-09, 328-416, 439-80, 509-25, 627-79, 727-71, 831-60, 925-50, 1049-107 (1964).
