= Blacko =

Village in Lancashire, England

Coordinates: 53.869°N 2.217°W

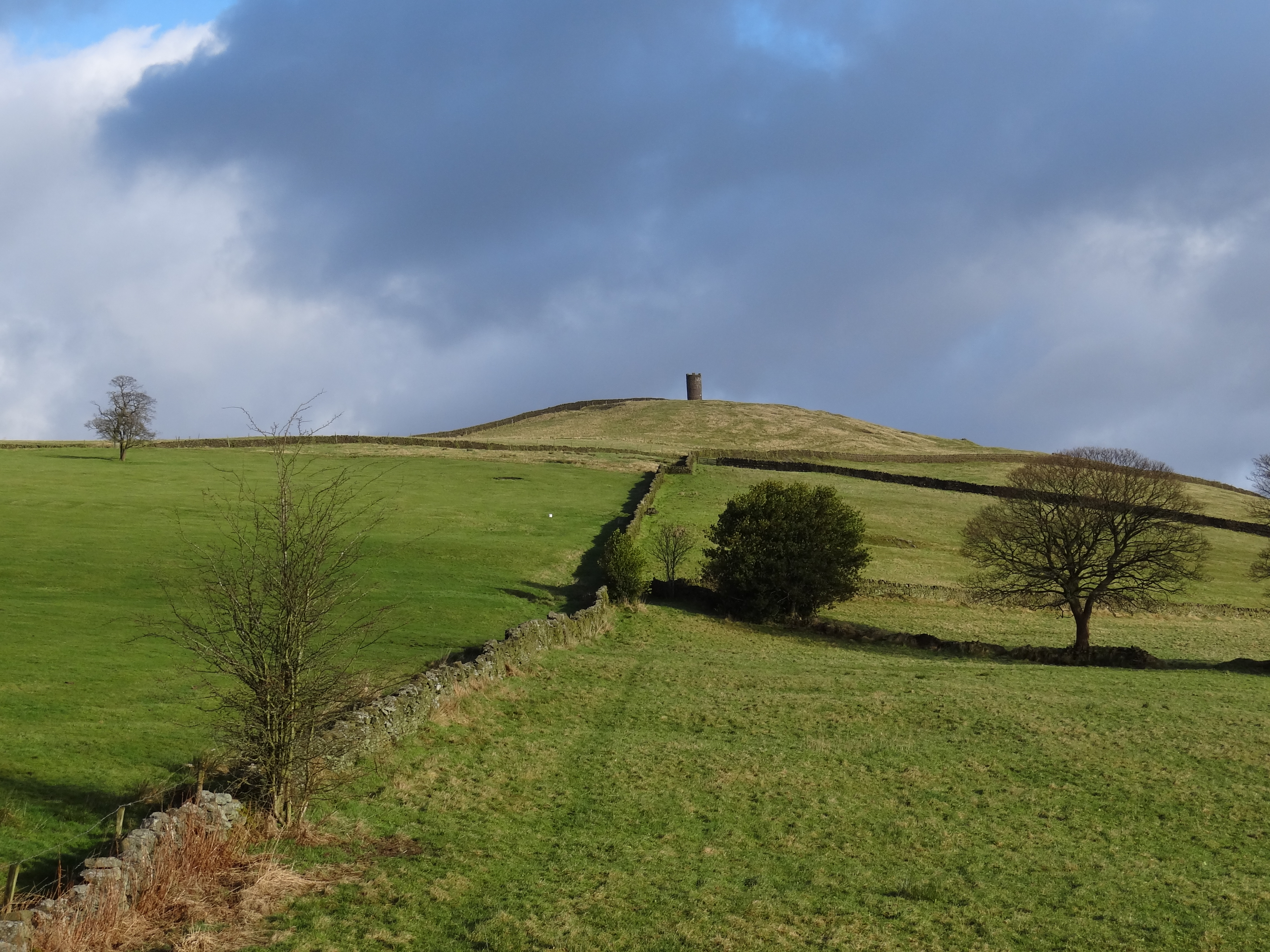
- A view of Blacko Tower taken from the top of the village in early winter

- Location in Pendle Borough Location within Lancashire
- Population: 672 (2011)
- OS grid reference: SD856415
- Civil parish: Blacko
- District: Pendle
- Shire county: Lancashire
- Region: North West
- Country: England
- Sovereign state: United Kingdom
- Post town: NELSON
- Postcode district: BB9
- Dialling code: 01282
- Police: Lancashire
- Fire: Lancashire
- Ambulance: North West
- UK Parliament: Pendle and Clitheroe

Blacko /ˈblækoʊ/ is a village and civil parish in the Pendle district of Lancashire, England. Before local government reorganisation in 1974 the village lay on the border with the West Riding of Yorkshire. The parish has a population of 672. The village is on the old turnpike road from Nelson to Gisburn (A682). The village enjoys views towards Boulsworth Hill to its southeast, the former cotton town of Nelson, about two miles to its south and Pendle Hill to its west across the valley of Pendle Water.

The parish adjoins the Pendle parishes of Middop, Bracewell and Brogden, Salterforth, Foulridge, Colne, Barrowford, Roughlee Booth and Barley-with-Wheatley Booth. Parts of the parish, west of the village are included in the Forest of Bowland Area of Outstanding Natural Beauty (AONB).

== History ==
Spring Field Mill was probably built around 1850 for cotton weaving and powered originally by a beam engine. Later the mill was extended and horizontal engine installed and it reached its fullest extent by 1910. Closed in the 1970s, the building survived into the 2000s, however a small housing estate now occupies the site.

Overlooking the village is Stansfield Tower (also known as Blacko Tower), which was built around 1890. A local grocer, Jonathan Stansfield, built this circular rough stone tower to provide himself with a view over Ribblesdale from the top, but the height fell somewhat short. A Bronze Age axe, believed to be 3,500 years old, was found near the tower in 1952.

The village has won the small village category of the Lancashire Best Kept Village competition in 2002 and 07, and the champion village category in 2011, 13, 15 and 16.

== Governance ==
The part of Blacko parish historically in Lancashire was once part of Barrowford township in the ancient parish of Whalley. This became a civil parish in 1866, however in 1894 the urban areas became an urban district and Blacko was created from the remainder, forming part of the Burnley Rural District until 1974. The area around Admergill formed part of Brogden township in Barnoldswick's ancient parish and later the Skipton Rural District, in the West Riding of Yorkshire.

Along with part of Barrowford, the parish forms the Blacko and Higherford ward of Pendle Borough Council.

The Village also is home to Blacko Events Committee, which regularly hold fundraising events including the Annual Blacko Show, which is held on the recreational site every September. The committee raise funds which then is put back into the community. One noticeable community project was the donation of funds to the Parish Council, to provide new play equipment on the recreation ground, which then went on to win Pendle community Networks Play Setting of the Year Award.

== Demography ==
According to the United Kingdom Census 2011, the parish has a population of 672, an increase from 595 in the 2001 census.

== People ==
Stone Edge (historically Stonehedge) was home to a branch of Burnley's Towneley family, some of whom emigrated to Virginia in the 17th century. As well as exporting the Towneley name, their descendants also included both George Washington and Robert E. Lee.

Blacko was the childhood home of Lancashire comedian Jimmy Clitheroe (1921–73), famous for his BBC radio series The Clitheroe Kid, who lived there from 1922 to 1935. Jimmy went to school in Blacko and appeared in many amateur concert party entertainments in the village's Methodist chapel, before turning professional in 1936.

Also during the 1930s it was the home of the comedian Tommy Trafford, who played many summer seasons in the Lancashire seaside resort of Southport between the 1960s and 1980s, resulting in his nickname of Mr Southport.

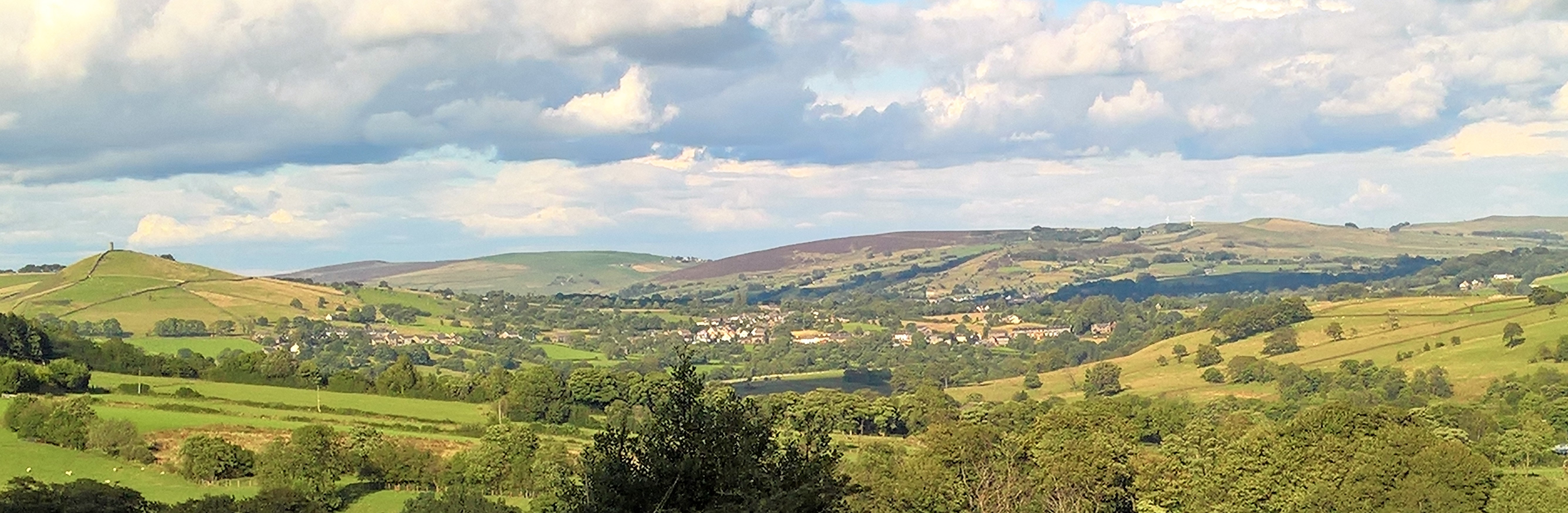
Blacko from the hillside above Thorneyholme in Barley-with-Wheatley Booth. Stansfield Tower at the summit of Blacko Hill is visible on the far left, with the village extending along the A682 Gisburn Road toward Higherford on the right.

== See also ==
- Listed buildings in Blacko
