= Barley, Lancashire =

Village in Lancashire, England

Coordinates: 53.860°N 2.273°W

Barley
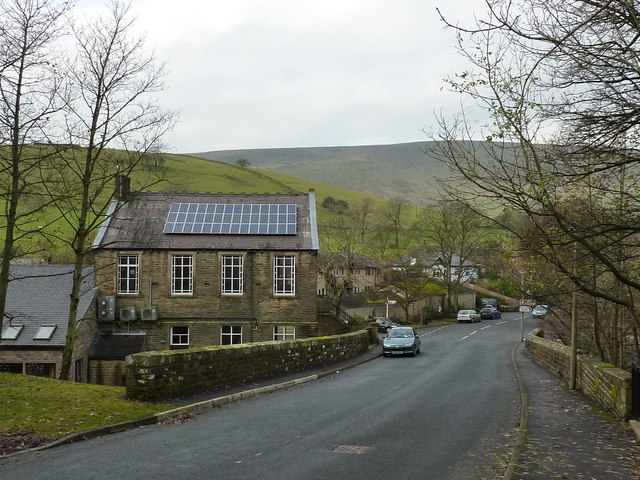
- Barley Village Hall

- Location in Pendle Borough Location in the Forest of Bowland AONB Location within Lancashire
- OS grid reference: SD821405
- Civil parish: Barley-with-Wheatley Booth
- District: Pendle
- Shire county: Lancashire
- Region: North West
- Country: England
- Sovereign state: United Kingdom
- Post town: BURNLEY
- Postcode district: BB12
- Dialling code: 01282
- Police: Lancashire
- Fire: Lancashire
- Ambulance: North West
- UK Parliament: Pendle

Barley is a village in the borough of Pendle, in Lancashire, England. It is in the civil parish of Barley-with-Wheatley Booth. The village lies between Black Moss Reservoirs and Ogden Reservoirs, and is within the Forest of Bowland Area of Outstanding Natural Beauty (AONB).

The hamlet of Barley Green is immediately southwest of the village. The village is close to Pendle Hill, and is a popular starting point for walkers of this hill. The circular Pendle Way long-distance trail passes through here.

There is a children's playground by the stream. There is also a substantial 1920s public house, The Pendle Inn, and a restaurant, The Barley Mow.

It has won the small village category in 1996 and the hamlet category of the Lancashire Best Kept Village competition in 2008, 2009 and 2021.

== History ==
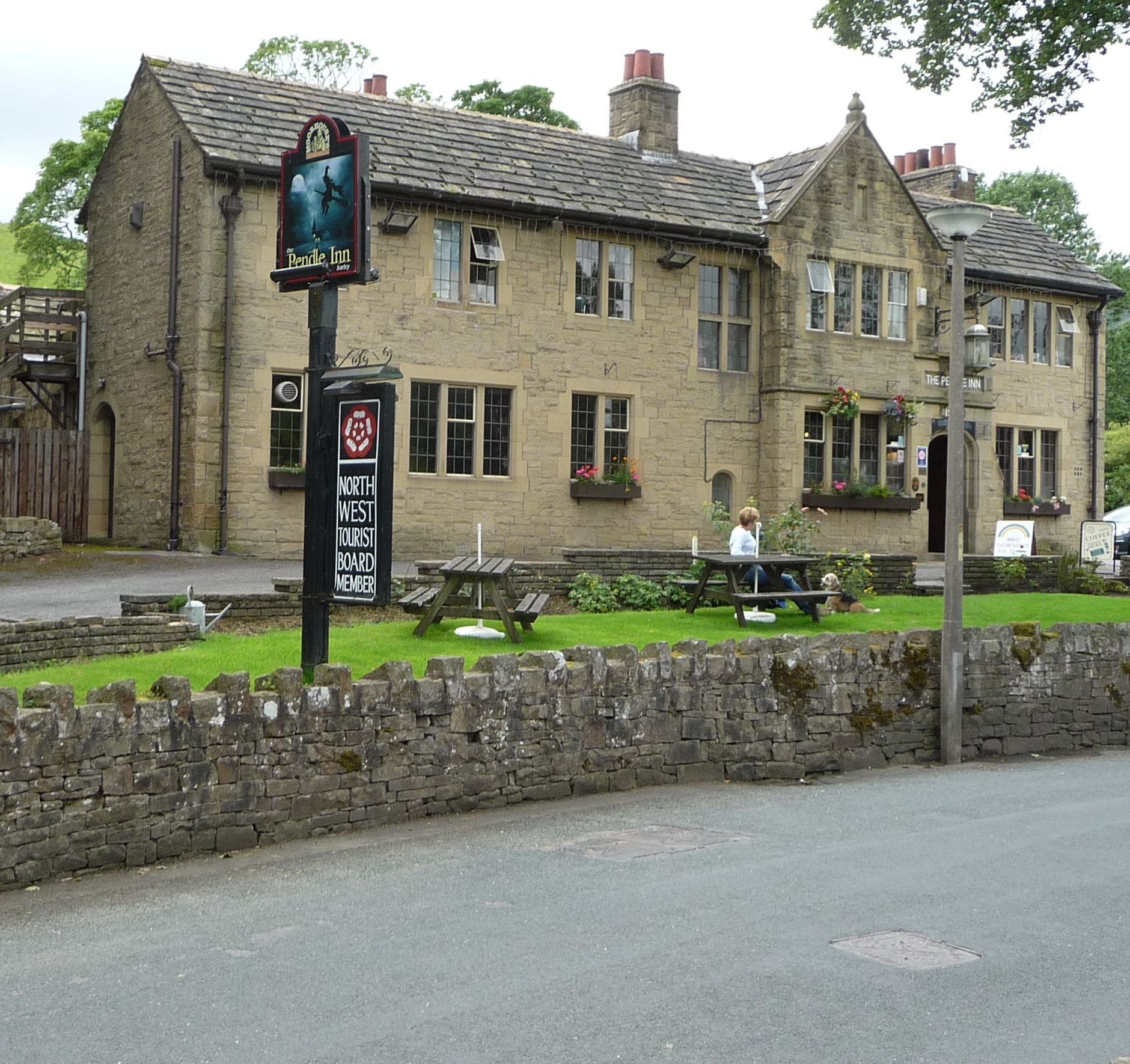
The Pendle Inn in Barley

After a cow farm was established around 1266, Barley earned its livelihood from agriculture. This continued up until the 18th century. During the 18th century, textiles began to be manufactured as an extra source of income. The brooks around Barley offered an effective source of waterpower which led to the building of several cotton factories. Two small cotton mills were built at Narrowgates and Barley Green. At its height, Barley Green Mill had 200 looms, until floods destroyed the building in 1880. The cotton twist mill at Narrowgates, which was built by William Hartley to spin cotton warp thread, and the adjacent weavers' cottages survive and are now private houses.
