= Skipton–East Lancashire Rail Action Partnership =

UK campaign group

Skipton East Lancashire Rail Action Partnership
- Formation: 2001
- Type: Voluntary organisation
- Members: 519 members and 51 affiliated groups
- Chairman: Andy Dixon

The Skipton East Lancashire Rail Action Partnership (SELRAP) is a campaign that is looking to reopen the Skipton to Colne railway line, as part of connecting the Lancashire town of Colne to the North Yorkshire town of Skipton. The line between them had been closed in 1970.

== History of the Skipton–Colne line ==
The line between Skipton and Colne was opened in October 1848, as part of the Leeds and Bradford Railway's Shipley to Colne extension and at a cost of £67,000 (equivalent to £6,900,000 in 2025). With the East Lancashire Railway reaching Colne from Burnley in February 1849, and the completion of the Liverpool, Ormskirk and Preston Railway in April 1849, a through route from Leeds to Liverpool was then established. Stations between Skipton and Colne were built at Elslack, Thornton-in-Craven, Earby and Foulridge. A branch from Earby to Barnoldswick was opened in 1871.

The Skipton–Colne line was not recommended for closure in Dr Beeching's 1963 The Reshaping of British Railways report; however the line closed in February 1970, with the Barnoldswick branch having earlier closed in September 1965.

== The missing link and current services ==
The 11.5 mile missing line between Skipton and Colne; the map also shows other railway lines in the area

The missing section of railway between Skipton and Colne is 11.5 miles (18.5 km) in length.

The remaining East Lancashire line serves a conurbation of some half a million people. It is relatively under-utilised and it is under-developed from an engineering perspective. Colne is currently served by one train per hour, which traverses the 50-mile (80 km) East Lancashire Line from Blackpool South via Preston, Blackburn and Burnley Central; there are many station stops at intermediate towns, with a total journey time in excess of 100 minutes. The route is affected by numerous permanent speed restrictions, particularly at junctions. Northern Trains operates services by Class 156 Class 150/1 diesel multiple units.

Skipton is a stop on the Airedale line and is served by frequent electric trains which serve Leeds every 30 minutes, with a journey time of around 40 minutes, and Bradford Forster Square every 30 minutes, with a journey time of around 35 minutes. These services are operated by Northern, using a mixture of Classes 331 and 333 electric multiple units. Northern also operates services through the town from Leeds to Lancaster, Morecambe and Heysham Port on the Bentham line; trains to Carlisle run on the Settle–Carlisle line. Skipton also has a daily direct return service to London Kings Cross operated by London North Eastern Railway (06.55 from Skipton, 18.03 from London).

== Reinstatement proposal ==
Reinstatement of Colne–Skipton would provide scope for both local and regional rail services. SELRAP say the line will deliver a number of benefits to local communities, the Northwest and the UK as a whole. SELRAP's proposals include opening at least one station between Skipton and Colne. The number and precise location(s) will depend on the viability study required. Whilst SELRAP are in favour of only one intermediate station (West Craven Parkway) in the interim, the Campaign for Better Transport are also wanting to see Earby railway station re-opened too.

A 2003 study commissioned by Lancashire and North Yorkshire County Councils from consultants Steer Davies Gleave found that the formation was largely intact and there were no insurmountable obstacles to reinstatement of the line. In 2007 SELRAP commissioned a study by JMP Consultants to further assess the business case. This appraisal showed that a positive benefit cost ratio would be achieved for a single track option under most growth and cost scenarios. A double track railway achieves a positive benefit cost ratio if recent trends of accelerating demand growth are assumed to continue.

Craven District Council and Pendle Borough Council are the two planning authorities within which the track-bed lies. Craven District Council protects the track-bed for transport use under planning policy SP2. Pendle Local Plan also protects the track-bed under policy ENV4.

At the county level, the Lancashire LEP board "Noted the robust and compelling case that the independent study by Cushman & Wakefield makes for enhanced East-West connectivity to realise the full economic potential of the Central Trans-Pennine Corridor and its role in delivering the long-term growth ambitions of the wider Northern Powerhouse". Though not affected to the same degree, re-instatement is supported in North Yorkshire Local Transport Plan (LTP4) 2016 to 2045, and by West Yorkshire Combined Authority.

The Route Utilisation Strategy (RUS) from Network Rail gave way to the Long Term Planning Process (LTPP) which in turn is being replaced in the north of England by the Strategic Transport Plan (STP) from Transport for the North. The section of the STP that applies is the Central Pennine Corridor.

On 3 February 2018, the Transport Secretary announced a feasibility study into reopening the route to passengers once again as part of the Government's plan to invite proposals to reopen many lines closed under British Rail. The study will be commissioned by Transport for the North and Network Rail and conclude later in 2018. The announcement was made at Colne station and covered in the press.

Chris Grayling announced in January 2019 that the initial study declared the project "technically feasible". The next step was to prove the worthiness of the re-opening by the commissioning of a business case which would look at the prospect of freight services on the line making the project "commercially feasible".

This line has been identified by Campaign for a Better Transport as a priority 1 candidate for reopening, with support also being voiced by local and regional businesses. David Cutter, the chief executive of Skipton Building Society, said that reopening of the line would improve connectivity between East Lancashire and North and West Yorkshire. It is estimated that over 1,600 personnel who work at Skipton Building Society's headquarters in Skipton have a Lancashire postcode.
