= Elslack =

Village and civil parish in North Yorkshire, England

- Village
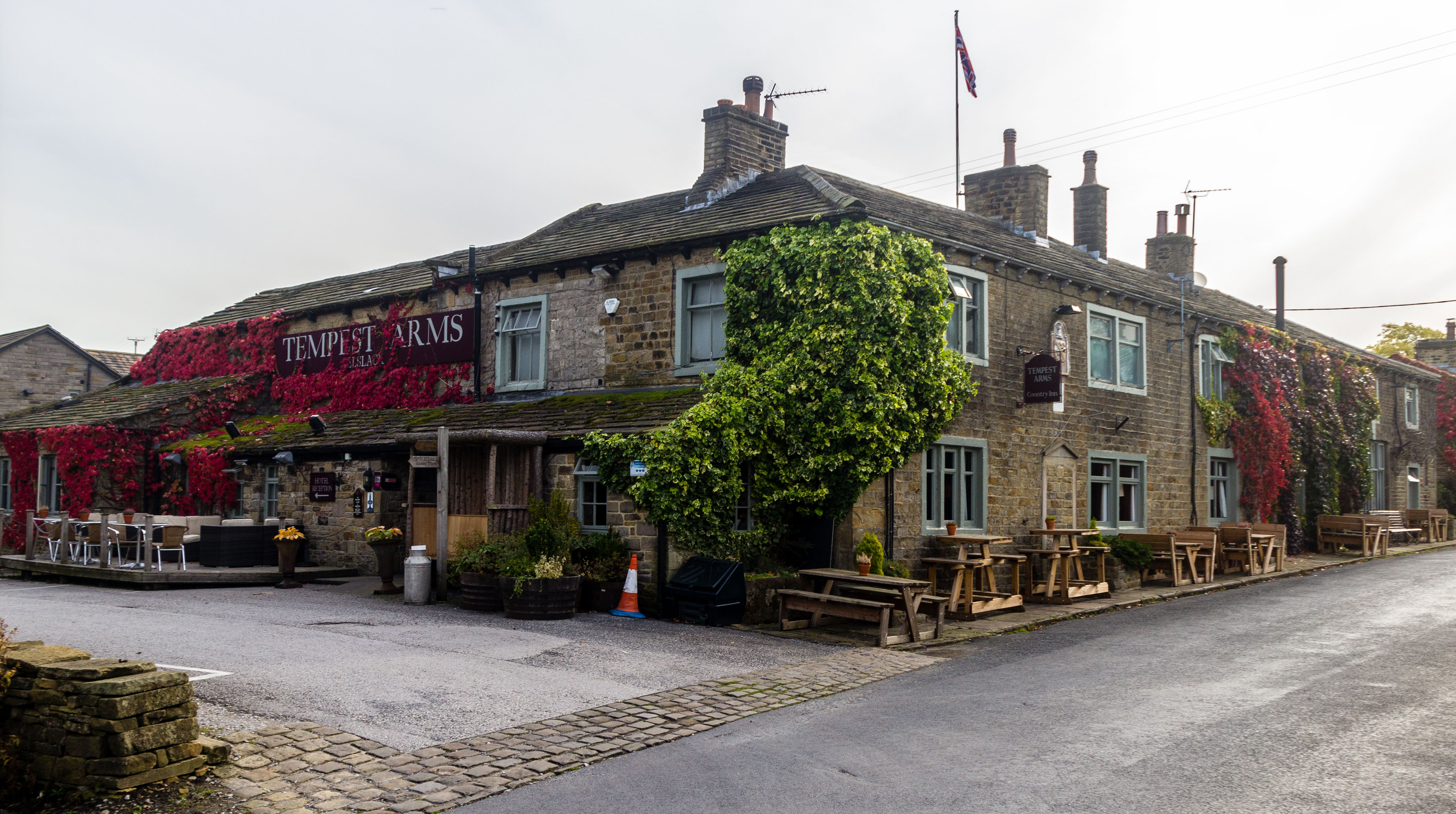
- the Tempest Arms in Elslack

- Location within North Yorkshire
- Population: 100 (2015 NYCC)
- OS grid reference: SD929492
- Civil parish: Elslack
- Unitary authority: North Yorkshire
- Ceremonial county: North Yorkshire
- Region: Yorkshire and the Humber
- Country: England
- Sovereign state: United Kingdom
- Police: North Yorkshire
- Fire: North Yorkshire
- Ambulance: Yorkshire
- UK Parliament: Skipton and Ripon Constituency

Elslack is a village and civil parish in the county of North Yorkshire, England, close to the border with Lancashire and 4.5 miles (7.2 km) west of Skipton. Thornton in Craven is nearby. The Tempest Arms is a large pub in the village, sited by the A56, which is popular with locals from the surrounding area. Elslack Moor, above the village, is crossed by the Pennine Way, though this does not visit the village itself. In 2015 it had a population of 100.

== History ==
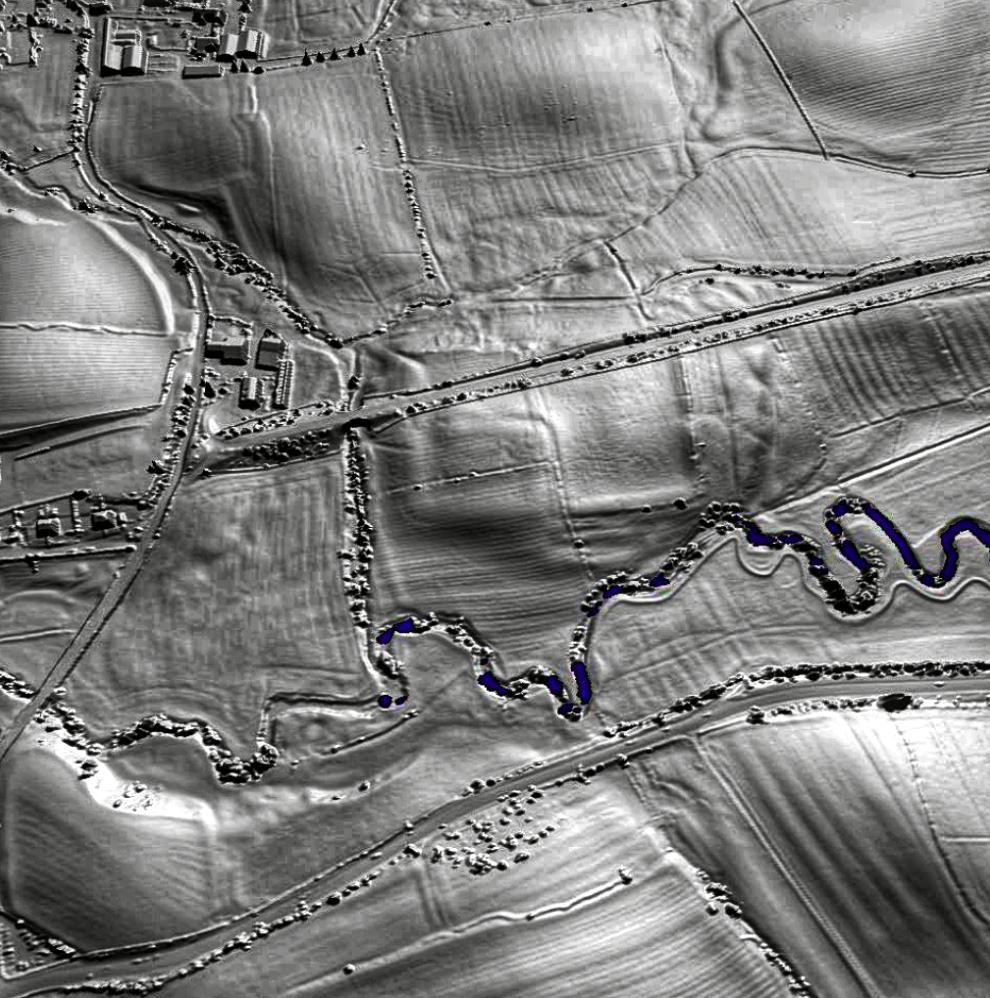
A lidar view of Burwen Roman forts one within the other

A Roman fort lies at 53.94078°N 2.1160°W about 550 yards (500 m) north-west of Elslack. The fort may have been named Olenacum, or Ριγοδουνον, according to the analysis of Ptolemy's coordinates by Kleineberg et al. It guarded a Roman road linking two other forts: Bremetennacum at Ribchester and another at Ilkley. This road has been traced by archaeologists running north-east up Ribblesdale about 0.6 miles (1 km) east of Clitheroe. Then at 53.893°N 2.3413°W it turns eastwards passing Barnoldswick, Elslack and Skipton.

Elslack is mentioned in the 1086 Domesday Book as Eleslac. The name derives from a personal name at the start (Elli or Elesa) and the Old English word for stream (Lacu).

Elslack Hall is thought to have been constructed in the 16th century (since modified) on the moated site of a Mediaeval manor house. Godfrey de Altaripa was granted a licence to crenellate a building here in 1318, presumably at this location.

Elslack had its own railway station which connected it with Colne and Skipton, but this was closed in 1952. The line passing through it suffered the same fate in 1970. Skipton is some 4.5 miles (7.2 km) to the north-east of Elslack. The Pennine Way long-distance walk crosses Elslack Moor (to the south-west of Elslack village), but the walk bypasses Elslack itself. The village is 50 yards (46 m) east of the A56 road which connects Skipton with Colne.

The Tempest Arms was named "Pub of the Year" in the 2011 Good Pub Guide.

== Governance ==
Historically the village was in the wapentake of Staincliffe (East), in the old West Riding of Yorkshire. In 1974, Elslack was transferred as part of the township of Broughton into the Craven District in the county of North Yorkshire. Population statistics for Elslack have been grouped together with Broughton, or with Thornton-in-Craven, especially in the 2001 and 2011 censuses, however by 2015, Elslack was again its own separate parish. Craven was abolished in 2023 and the village is now administered by the unitary North Yorkshire Council.

The area is represented at Westminster as part of the Skipton and Ripon Constituency.

Population of Elslack 1801–2015
1841	1851	1861	1871	1881	1891	1901	1911	1921	1931	1951	1961	1971	2001	2011	2015
188	132	112	80	82	92	80	85	94	77	96	94	103	(Note: Population statistics are included with Broughton as part of the 2001 census.)	90 (Note: Estimated population.)	100 (Note: Estimated population.)

== See also ==
- Listed buildings in Elslack
