= Barnoldswick Railway =

UK railway company

The Barnoldswick Railway was an English railway company, that constructed a short branch line to Barnoldswick (Note: At that time Barnoldswick was in the West Riding of Yorkshire, but since the local government reorganisation of 1974 it has been in Lancashire.) from a junction on the Midland Railway line from Skipton to Colne. It was opened in 1871, and was worked from the outset by the Midland Railway. It was moderately successful in financial terms, and the company was acquired by the Midland Railway in 1899.

Declining usage led to the line being closed to passengers in 1965 and to goods in 1966.

== Construction and opening ==
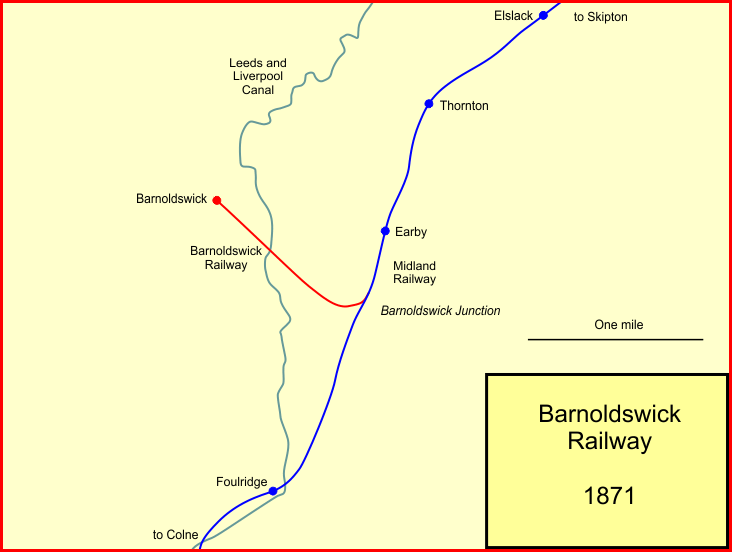
The Barnoldswick branch line

Barnoldswick was a small cotton weaving community, located in the West Craven area of the West Riding of Yorkshire before becoming incorporated into the district of Pendle in Lancashire in 1974. Local industry was hampered by poor transport links, although this was mitigated by the opening of a local part of the Leeds and Liverpool Canal in the last decade of the 18th century.

The Midland Railway line from Skipton to Colne opened in 1848, by-passing Barnoldswick, and this emphasised the disadvantage, giving a boost to communities on the line of route.

Barnoldswick Railway Act 1867
- Act of Parliament
- Parliament of the United Kingdom
- Long title: An Act for making and maintaining a Railway from Barnoldswick to the Leeds and Bradford Extension of the Midland Railway at or near Sough Bridge in the West Riding of the County of York; and for other Purposes.
- Citation: 30 & 31 Vict. clxxxi

Dates
- Royal assent: 12 August 1867

Text of statute as originally enacted

Commitment was raised locally to build a line from the town to make a junction with the Midland Railway at Sough Bridge, near Earby. An authorising act of Parliament for the Barnoldswick Railway Company, the Barnoldswick Railway Act 1867 (30 & 31 Vict. clxxxi), was obtained on 12 August 1867. (Note: Carter has 12 August 1865, but this is a misprint; the page is headed "1867" and other items on the page are for that year, but this item alone has the wrong year. The error was repeated by Binns, page 12.)

The line was 1 mile 1,342 yards (2.836 km) in length from the junction at Sough Bridge; the junction was called Barnoldswick Junction. The line was worked by the Midland Railway from its opening on 13 February 1871. (Note: Binns and some other sources quote 8 February. Quick mentions this and states that the error was originated in Bradshaw's Shareholders' Manual, and has been repeated by others. Quick is subject to continuous peer review and is likely to be authoritative. Stretton gives the correct date.) by the Midland Railway.

== Train service ==
In 1895 there were nine trains each way between Barnoldswick and Earby, with four each way on Sundays. By 1910 the service had increased to between 15 and 18 on weekdays, varying by day of the week, and six on Sundays. In 1922 the weekday service was similar, but the Sunday service had fallen to two trains each way. In 1938 there were 26 trains Monday to Friday, with 28 on Saturdays and nine on Sundays.

== Absorbed by the Midland Railway ==
In March 1898, the Barnoldswick company asked the Midland Railway if it would purchase the line. As it was trouble-free and regularly paid out a reasonable if fluctuating dividend — on 30 June 1897, it was 5 per cent — the Midland agreed and the necessary powers were obtained in 1899. The Midland Railway absorbed the company by the Midland Railway Act 1899 (62 & 63 Vict. c. cvii) of 13 July 1899. It was the last company to be acquired by the Midland Railway. (Note: The Midland Railway ceased to exist when it was absorbed into the new London Midland and Scottish Railway on the first day of 1923.)

== Light railway proposed ==
In May 1904, the Barnoldswick and Gisburn Light Railway sought powers to make a short single track line leaving the Lancashire and Yorkshire Railway just north of Gisburn station and connecting with the Barnoldswick branch. It was scotched by the L&YR's refusal to allow a junction at Gisburn.

Baughan explains:

Actually, the L&YR pulled a fast one over the engineer to the line, E O Ferguson, by appearing to agree to all the clauses and then turning up at the inquiry, held by two of the Light Railway Commissioners in the 'Ribblesdale Arms' at Gisburn, and denying that it would permit the junction. The company had, it appeared, been too busy to look at the scheme properly. Shattered by this bland effrontery, the promoters withdrew the scheme. Nine years later, presumably having had enough time to reason out where they had gone wrong, the idea was again put forward, on a slightly amended route, and without the junction to the Midland. This time the L&YR was all smiles, provided it was permitted to work the line.

The order was granted but World War I prevented any actual construction.

== Heating in the trains ==
On 16 November 1922 the Midland Railway traffic committee authorised the fitting of steam heating apparatus in the nine carriages and two engines working the Barnoldswick branch service, nearly twenty years after the main line coaches had been so fitted and barely a month before the Midland Railway ceased to exist, due to the Grouping of 1923.

== Closure ==
Declining use led to the closure of the branch, to passengers on 27 September 1965 and to goods on 1 August 1966.

== Location list ==
- Barnoldswick Junction;
- Barnoldswick; opened 13 February 1871; closed 27 September 1965.

== See also ==
- Barnoldswick railway station
- Earby railway station
