= The Old Green Tree =

Listed pub in Bath, England

- The pub in 2026

General information
- Type: Public house
- Location: 12 Green Street, Bath, Somerset, England
- Coordinates: 51°23′00″N 2°21′37″W
- Completed: c. 1770 (256 years ago)
- Renovated: 1926 (remodelled)
- Owner: Wellington

Design and construction
- Designations

Listed Building – Grade II
- Official name: The Old Green Tree public house
- Designated: 5 August 1975
- Reference no.: 1396308

Other information
- Public transit: Bath Spa

The Old Green Tree is a Grade II listed public house on Green Street in Bath, Somerset, England. Dating from around 1770 and possibly incorporating an earlier structure, it has been known by its present name since the 1770s and is one of the oldest pubs in Bath. Remodelled and extended by the architect W. A. Williams in 1926, it retains a notably complete historic interior and is included in the Campaign for Real Ale (CAMRA)'s National Inventory of Historic Pub Interiors with a three-star rating, recognising it as being of "outstanding national historic importance".

== History ==
The official listing dates the present building to around 1770 and notes that it may incorporate an earlier structure. It has been known as the Old Green Tree since the 1770s, making it one of the oldest public houses in Bath. Another account traces the pub's history to 1716, linking its name to a tree that reportedly stood beside a former bowling green on land later developed by the milliner John Cornish as Green Street. That account also states that the pub was originally smaller than it is today.

It was extended to the rear in 1926. A beam across the ceiling in the main bar denotes the original back wall of the original building. It was refurbished by local architect W. A. Williams. The pub was a free house until 1928, when Lamb Brewery became the landlord. The pub's Green Tree Bitter is brewed locally by Blindman's Brewery.

On 5 August 1975, the Old Green Tree was designated a Grade II listed building. It is regarded by the Campaign for Real Ale (CAMRA) as having an interior of "outstanding national historic importance" and is rated three stars on its National Inventory of Historic Pub Interiors.

The pub has been included in each edition of the Good Beer Guide since 1998, and was named UK City Pub of the Year by The Good Pub Guide in 2005 and 2008. The Daily Telegraph named it Somerset's Pub of the Year for 2024.

Tim Bethune took over the lease in 2014. As of September 2026, the freehold was owned by Wellington.

== Architecture ==
=== Exterior ===
The building is constructed of painted limestone ashlar with a Welsh slate roof. It has a narrow double-depth plan with a rear extension and is arranged over three storeys with an attic. The principal elevation is a single bay wide and contains six-over-six sash windows with horns, beneath a coved cornice and parapet. Above is a mansard roof with a single flat-topped dormer containing a further six-over-six sash window. The ground floor retains a modern pilastered pub front with a tripartite window and an entrance to the right.

=== Interior ===
The interior retains a notably complete ensemble of joinery from 1926. A drinking lobby at the front of the pub has fielded timber panelling and a parquet floor, while the room doors preserve the numbered identifiers formerly used for licensing purposes.

The front lounge is a small room lined with fielded panelling and fitted with fixed seating along the front window. It retains a small glazed-brick fireplace and is served through an opening beside the servery. The central public bar similarly retains fielded panelling, a parquet floor, a panelled bar counter, a modest rooflight and a fireplace with a glazed-brick surround.

At the rear is a former smoke room, entered through a numbered door with leaded-glass panels. Like the other principal rooms, it retains parquet flooring and fielded wall panelling, together with fixed bench seating and a fireplace dating from the 1930s. The ladies' and gentlemen's toilets are accessed from the rear of the public bar; the gentlemen's facilities retain 1926 urinals, glazed red-brick wall finishes and a quarry-tiled floor.
