= Thornton in Craven =

Village and civil parish in North Yorkshire, England

Coordinates: 53.932°N 2.143°W

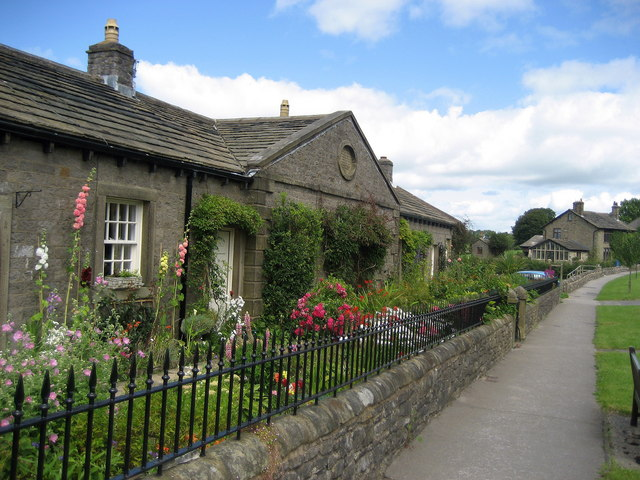
- Almshouses at Thornton in Craven

- Location within North Yorkshire
- Population: 431 (Including Elslack. 2011 census)
- OS grid reference: SD906485
- Unitary authority: North Yorkshire
- Ceremonial county: North Yorkshire
- Region: Yorkshire and the Humber
- Country: England
- Sovereign state: United Kingdom
- Post town: SKIPTON
- Postcode district: BD23
- Dialling code: 01282
- Police: North Yorkshire
- Fire: North Yorkshire
- Ambulance: Yorkshire
- UK Parliament: Skipton and Ripon

Thornton-in-Craven is a village and civil parish in the county of North Yorkshire, England. It is approx 1,740 feet (530 m) from the border with Lancashire and 1 mile (1.6 km) north of Earby. Barnoldswick is nearby. The Pennine Way passes through the village, as does the A56 road.

Until 1974 it was part of the West Riding of Yorkshire. From 1974 to 2023 it was part of Craven District. It is now administered by the unitary North Yorkshire Council.

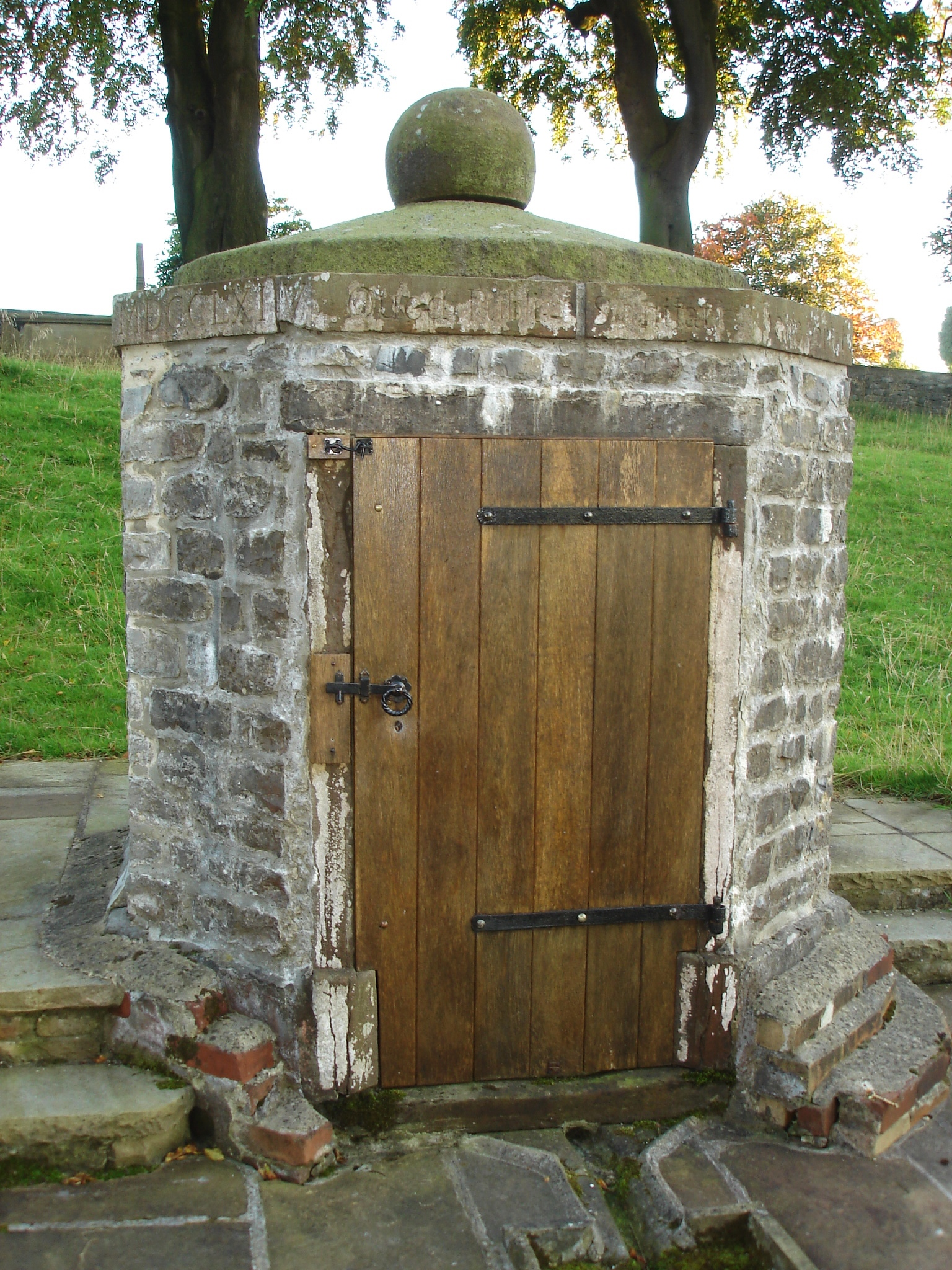
Holy well in St Mary the Virgin churchyard

St Mary's Church lies in the village, along with a primary school and a retirement home, but no shops or pubs. The historic almshouses provide accommodation for five single persons. Near the medieval church to, the west of the village, is a holy well dating from Saxon times, and now covered by an octagonal structure erected in 1764 by the rector; the structure is now grade II listed.

Thornton-in-Craven railway station was closed when passenger trains over the Skipton to Colne route were withdrawn in 1970. SELRAP are actively pursuing a re-opening of the line which was given a boost in February 2018, when the transport minister, Chris Grayling, ordered a feasibility study into the reopening.

The village playing field, at the bottom of Boothbridge Lane, is home to Thornton in Craven Cricket Club who compete in the Craven League. The team is heavily populated by players from nearby Earby and Barnoldswick, with a few representatives from the village itself. In 2022 the club were winners of the Third Division title and won the Cowling Cup.

Poet Blake Morrison grew up in the village.

== See also ==
- Listed buildings in Thornton in Craven
