= Tempest Arms =

Listed pub in North Yorkshire, England

- The pub in 2021
- Interactive map of the Tempest Arms area

General information
- Type: Public house
- Location: Elslack Lane, Elslack, North Yorkshire, England
- Coordinates: 53.9444°N 2.1133°W
- Year built: 1786; 240 years ago
- Renovated: 1801 (extended); 2023 (refurbished)
- Owner: Robinsons Brewery

Design and construction
- Designations

Listed Building – Grade II
- Official name: Tempest Arms public house
- Designated: 31 October 1988
- Reference no.: 1316778

Website
- tempestarms.co.uk

The Tempest Arms is a historic public house on Elslack Lane in Elslack, a village in North Yorkshire, England.

The pub was built in 1786 and extended in 1801. It was Grade II listed in 1988, and in 2011 it was named the Good Pub Guide's national pub of the year. In 2023, it was refurbished by its owners, Robinsons Brewery, at which time it had 21 bedrooms, a bar and a dining room.

The pub is built of stone with quoins and a stone slate roof. It has two storeys and seven bays. In the left bay are three-light recessed square mullioned windows, and the second bay contains a blocked doorway with a hood, over which is a plaque with a coat of arms, initials and a date. In the third bay is a two-light mullioned window. The right part contains a doorway with a flat arch, and a keystone with initials and a date.

== See also ==
- Listed buildings in Elslack
