= Thornton-in-Craven railway station =

Disused railway station in North Yorkshire, England

Thornton-in-Craven
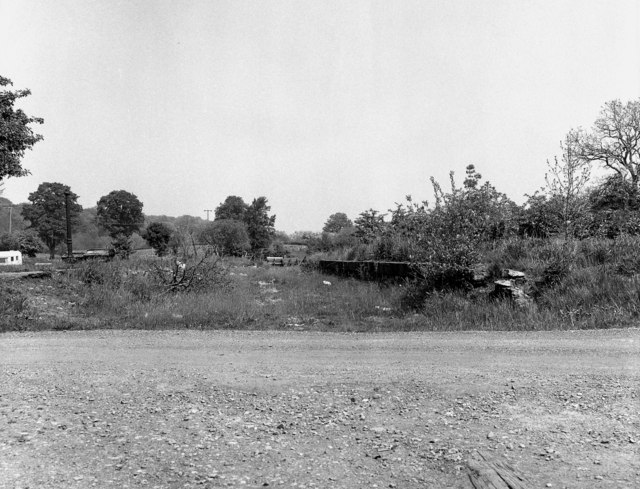
- The site of the station (1984)

General information
- Location: Thornton-in-Craven, North Yorkshire, England
- Coordinates: 53.9304°N 2.1383°W
- Grid reference: SD91004824
- Platforms: 2

Other information
- Status: Disused

History
- Original company: Leeds and Bradford Extension Railway
- Pre-grouping: Midland Railway
- Post-grouping: London, Midland and Scottish Railway

Key dates
- 2 October 1848: Opened
- 2 February 1970: Closed to passengers
Location

Thornton-in-Craven railway station served the small village of Thornton-in-Craven, in North Yorkshire (formerly the West Riding of Yorkshire), England. Between 1848 and 1970, it was a stop on the Leeds and Bradford Extension Railway which connected Colne, Skipton and Bradford Market Street.

== History ==
The station was built by the Leeds and Bradford Extension Railway, opening in 1848. It was known simply as Thornton, with the in-Craven suffix added to the name in 1937.

Situated on the edge of the village and below it, the station closed in 1970, along with the railway; it had previously avoided earlier closure proposals in 1959.

The closure notice for the village's station was met with indifference; it was pointed out by residents that the bus service was frequent and reliable, and the station was remote from the village. The service had also been poor in latter years, with just two eastbound and four westbound trains calling each weekday and no calls at all on a Sunday.

The last trains ran on Sunday 1 February 1970, with the line closing the next day. The track through the station was lifted later that year and the main building on the westbound platform demolished by 1973.

Preceding station	Disused railways	Following station
Earby	Midland Railway; Leeds and Bradford Extension Railway	Elslack

== The site today ==
The former station house survived demolition and is now privately owned; the trackbed is used as a shared-use path, with a parking area for the nearby cricket ground.

== Future proposals ==
The railway between Colne and Skipton is proposed for reopening to enable a cross-Pennine service; it would allow residents access to Leeds within one hour. This campaign is being promoted by the Skipton-East Lancashire Rail Action Partnership (SELRAP). One of the scoping reports commissioned by SELRAP notes that there would be only two intermediate stations between Colne and Skipton, at Foulridge and Earby; Thornton-in-Craven does not appear as a proposal for reopening.
