= Listed buildings in Elslack =

Elslack is a civil parish in the county of North Yorkshire, England. It contains nine listed buildings that are recorded in the National Heritage List for England. Of these, one is listed at Grade II*, the middle of the three grades, and the others are at Grade II, the lowest grade. The parish contains the village of Elslack and the surrounding countryside. The listed buildings consist of houses, farmhouses and farm buildings, a public house, and three boundary stones.

== Key ==
Grade	Criteria
II*	Particularly important buildings of more than special interest
II	Buildings of national importance and special interest

== Buildings ==
Name and location	Photograph	Date	Notes	Grade
Elslack Hall Farmhouse, cottage and wall 53.93910°N 2.11045°W		16th century (probable)	A manor house that has been much altered, in stone, with quoins and a stone slate roof, one gable with a crocketed finial. There are two storeys, two bays, and a cross-wing on the right. On the front is a two-storey porch and a round-headed doorway with impost blocks and voussoirs. The windows have double-chamferd mullions, and on the gabled end are two six-light windows, each light arched, with hood moulds. Attached to the cross-wing is a garden wall containing two rectangular bee boles with shelves.	II*
Great Barn, Elslack Hall Farm; 53.93963°N 2.10968°W		1672	The barn is in stone with quoins and a stone slate roof. It is rectangular, long and narrow. The openings include a doorway with a chamfered surround, a doorway with a Tudor arch, two cart entries with chamfered surrounds and elliptical heads, and vents. Over one cart entry is a dated and initialled stone.	II
Bridge Cottage; 53.93909°N 2.10513°W		Late 17th century (probable)	A cottage was added to the left of the house in the 19th century. They are in stone with a stone slate roof. There are two storeys and four bays. On the front are two doorways, the left one plain, and the right with a chamfered surround. To the right is a three-light double-chamfered mullioned window, and the other windows are sashes.	II
Elslack Grange; 53.93963°N 2.10811°W		Late 17th century (probable)	The house is in stone, with a stone slate roof, two storeys and three bays. In the centre is a doorway with a plain surround, a fanlight and a cornice, and the windows have square mullions.	II
Johnson's Gate Farmhouse and barn 53.94131°N 2.11283°W	—	Late 18th century	The farmhouse and attached barn are in stone with a stone slate roof. The farmhouse has two storeys and three bays. The central doorway has a plain surround and a triangular hood, and the windows are chamfered and mullioned with sashes. At the rear is a Gothic stair window.	II
Tempest Arms Public House; 53.94434°N 2.11330°W		1786	The public house, which was later extended, is in stone with quoins and a stone slate roof. There are two storeys and seven bays. In the left bay are three-light recessed square mullioned windows, and the second bay contains a blocked doorway with a hood, over which is a plaque with a coat of arms, initials and a date. In the third bay is a two-light mullioned window. The right part contains a doorway with a flat arch, and a keystone with initials and a date.	II
Boundary Stone at NGR 9467 4882; 53.93555°N 2.08242°W	—	Early or mid 19th century	The parish boundary stone is a small squared stone inscribed with "GLF".	II
Boundary Stone at NGR 9485 4856; 53.93316°N 2.07977°W		Early or mid 19th century	The parish boundary stone is a small squared stone inscribed with "GLF".	II
Boundary Stone at NGR 9266 4967; 53.94322°N 2.11311°W		19th century (probable)	The parish boundary stone consists of a stone slab set edgewise to the road, the north side inscribed "Thornton B" and the south side "Elslack B".	II
