= Barnoldswick and Gisburn Light Railway Company =

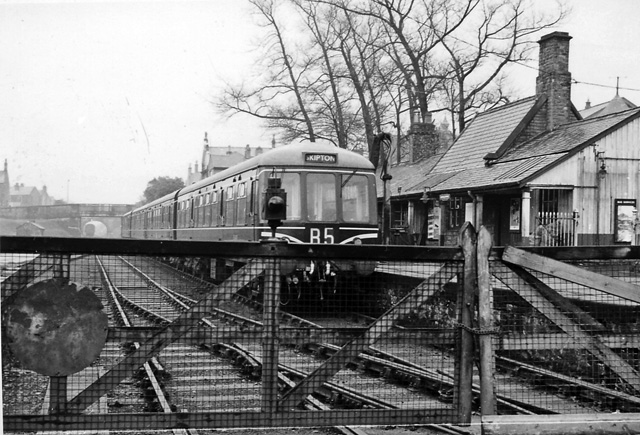
Barnoldswick Railway Station, the terminus of the Barnoldswick Railway in the early 1960s. This railway was closed in 1965.

The Barnoldswick & Gisburn Light Railway Company was formed in May 1904 to build a light railway from the town of Barnoldswick in the West Riding of Yorkshire to the Ribble Valley Line at Gisburn. The planned railway was to be single track but wasn't built because the Lancashire and Yorkshire Railway refused to build a junction near Gisburn. There was another proposal in 1913 without a junction but this was abandoned due to the outbreak of the First World War.
