= Barnoldswick railway station =

Disused railway station in Lancashire, England

Barnoldswick
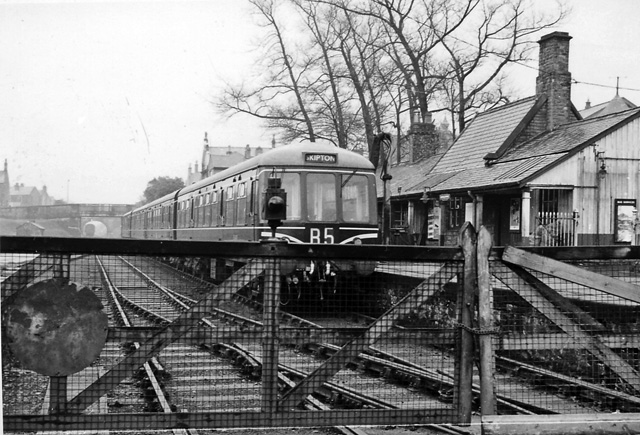
- Barnoldswick railway station in 1961

General information
- Location: Barnoldswick, Pendle; England
- Coordinates: 53.9170°N 2.1867°W
- Platforms: 1

Other information
- Status: Disused

History
- Original company: Barnoldswick Railway
- Pre-grouping: Midland Railway
- Post-grouping: London, Midland and Scottish Railway

Key dates
- 8 February 1871: Station opened
- 27 September 1965: Station closed to passengers
- 30 July 1966: station closed completely
Location

Barnoldswick was the only railway station on the Midland Railway's 1-mile-64-chain (2.9 km) long Barnoldswick Branch in the West Riding of Yorkshire in England (now in the Pendle District of Lancashire); it served the market town of Barnoldswick. The line left the Leeds and Bradford Extension Railway at Barnoldswick Junction 55 chains (3,600 ft; 1,100 m) from Earby. The line through the junction was on a 20-chain (1,300 ft; 400 m) radius after which it converged to a single track and ran in a straight but undulating line to Barnoldswick. The passenger train that ran back and forth between Barnoldswick and Earby was known locally as the Barlick Spud or Spudroaster. The real reason for the name is lost in time, but the two versions that were commonly recited are that the original branch locomotive was so small it looked like a portable potato roaster used by a local vendor or that the journey time was the same as that taken to roast a potato in the locomotive's firebox.

== Opening ==
The line was built by the Barnoldswick Railway and worked by the Midland Railway from its opening on 8 February 1871. The Midland absorbed the Barnoldswick Railway in 1899.

== Layout ==
=== Station area ===
The station was at the end of a single line branch with a single platform on which was sited the stone and wood station building. The stone part being the original Barnoldswick Company’s building, the wooden parts being added in two stages by the Midland Railway. Also on the platform was a swan-necked water crane, originally fed from a large water tank in the coal yard but later connected to the town supply. At the opposite end of the platform to Barnoldswick Junction was a level crossing that gave access to the coal yard. Steps at the platform end gave access to the level crossing, there being no ramp at this end. The level crossing had to be used to run-round any train, the gates being opened & closed by hand. It was unusual in that when closed against the railway both gates swung to cover the platform side, the goods yard being left unprotected.

=== Goods yard ===
The goods yard was opposite to the platform. Against the level crossing was an end loading accessed from the run-round loop. Further from the level crossing was a large wooden goods shed that had been extended at some time and near to the station throat a platelayers' hut. Near this hut the lines led off to the goods shed, a siding that stopped short of the goods shed and a further siding that extended right past the goods shed to reach Wellhouse Road. Passing under Bridge No 10 (Rainhall Road) the line entered a cutting with a crossover to the main line and the start of a long headshunt. The crossover was controlled by a 2-lever ground frame open to the elements and unlocked by the key on the end of the Branch Staff. The headshunt was also used for storing the branch passenger stock. Bridge No 9 (Rook Street) crossed both the running line and the headshunt. The goods shed was demolished in the early 1950s. The line to the loading dock was retained as was the long siding but the other two were lifted. In the early 1960s the long siding was used for the storage of surplus suburban coaching stock.

=== Coal yard ===
At one time a large iron water tank on wooden legs stood in the coal yard adjacent to Station Road and next to the level crossing. A small collection of coal merchants' offices stood just inside the double entrance gates on an area that was part covered in setts. Only one siding could be accessed from the platform line so as to allow locomotives to run-round. All the others could only be accessed from the run-round loop. The 1892 Ordnance Survey map shows the goods yard to have been very short with a total of four sidings, none of them over 100 ft in length, the total capacity being twenty wagons. The 1909 map shows that three of the sidings have been doubled in length. They were extended again in 1913 as near as they could be to Skipton Road. This extension was built on an embankment so advantage of this was taken to build coal drops with road access from Skipton Road. A ground frame in a standard Midland Railway hut was situated just inside the goods yard near the level crossing but on the opposite side of the tracks to the coal offices. There was also a small engine shed built by 1880 that was a sub-shed to Skipton shed but this had closed by July 1912 to make way for extra coal sidings. The coal yard was one of the few places where the Midland Railway officially allowed its locomotives to tow wagons on an adjacent line by rope.

== Signalling ==
Despite the station's size there was never a signal box. At the end of the platform was the only signal, a single crossbar stop signal topped by a lamp. This was hand operated from the base of the post and was not interlocked to any points or the level crossing gates. This signal however, for quite a period, was seldom used.

== Traffic ==
The 1881 timetable shows that all trains were composed of both passenger carriages and goods wagons. Eight trains were run each way with no services running on a Sunday. The first train left Barnoldswick at 7.35 am and arrived at Earby at 7.43 am. The last train left Earby at 6.50 pm and arrived at Barnoldswick at 7.00 pm. The locomotive for these trains was shedded at Barnoldswick. Advertised excursions at this time show trains running from Barnoldswick to Leeds (en route to Scarborough) and back. Also the L&YR ran excursions from Barnoldswick to Colne (en route to Blackpool) and back. These later trains saw L&YR engines and stock at Barnoldswick.

The 1903 timetable showed the number of trains as 11 during the week with two extra late trains on a Saturday from Barnoldswick and 10 during the week with two extra late trains on a Saturday from Earby. Whether these trains were still mixed trains isn't known.

The 1911 timetable shows a more frequent but complicated service with most trains running as passenger only, the actual number of trains varying depending on the day of the week. There were two trains that ran each way as mixed and two goods trains to, and three from, Barnoldswick. Sundays saw five passenger and two mixed trains to Barnoldswick with 6 passenger trains from but no mixed trains.

The 1921 service was as frequent as the 1911 but simplified. 1929 saw 16 week-day departures plus a 'Tue and Fri only' train. Passenger numbers had fallen from 116,366 in 1928 to 104,638 in 1929 but in 1930 there was a huge fall to 63,608. This was caused by the opening of what is still known locally as 'the new road'in December 1929. This enabled Ezra Laycock to start a bus service from Barnoldswick via Salterforth to Earby. By 1934 the number of departures had risen to 24 departures. Sunday evenings saw 9 trains running but none during the day. Sunday services had ceased by 1939. The number of passenger trains was reduced until by 1956 it was down to 12 or so a day.

From September 1956, however, it was reduced to just 1 in and 2 out per day. This later changed to just 1 in and out, plus a single mid-day goods train, that was the pattern maintained until the passenger service was withdrawn. The passenger trains were mainly for pupils at Ermysted's Grammar School and the Skipton Girls' High School, both in Skipton. The termination of these trains saw the last of any significant passenger numbers using the station. Excursion trains to the seaside and special trains for Skipton Gala were still run but had little or no advertising.

Preceding station	Disused railways	Following station
Terminus	Midland Railway; Barnoldswick Railway	Earby

== Locomotives and stock ==
The first locomotive allocated to the branch and the small engine shed was a 0-4-2WT. This was followed by an 0-6-0T and then an 0-4-4T. Goods and passenger trains were also handled by double-framed 0-6-0 and later single framed 0-6-0. These were all MR engines. Passenger stock was a mixture of 4 & 6 wheeled and bogie carriages. Steam train heating for the two locomotives and nine carriages allocated to the Barnoldswick branch was only authorised on 16 November 1922 – 20 years after the Midland Railway had introduced it to their mainline carriages.

The LMS, who had taken over the Midland Railway at the Railway Grouping in 1922, continued to use the MR 0-6-0T and 0-6-0 locomotives but also used LYR 2-4-2T for passenger trains. It introduced push-pull trains from 2 February 1931 in an attempt to reverse the downward trend in passenger numbers with the opening of the 'New Road' to Kelbrook. In later years the Ivatt 2-6-0 and 2-6-2T locomotives appeared as well as the ageing MR 0-4-4Ts. The Riddles variant of the Ivatt 2-6-2T also appeared at Barnoldswick. Excursion or special trains sometimes brought Fairburn 2-6-4T locomotives to the station. On one occasion Skipton shed used a Stanier 4-6-0 Jubilee class locomotive No. 45658 Keyes to work the morning train. Diesel Multiple Units (DMUs) were used for the evening school train from September 1959 but the morning train remained steam to the end. The mid-day goods train was sometimes worked by LMS Fowler Class 4F locomotives.

== Last trains ==
The last passenger train ran on 25 September 1965, with official closure coming on the 27 September 1965; the last coal train ran on 30 July 1966.

== Post-closure ==
The station was subsequently demolished, a supermarket and car park being built on the site. The coal yard is now landscaped and a new road built across it. The goods yard wall is still standing and is the car park boundary. The platform retaining wall can be seen down the side of the supermarket. Above this wall the former Station Master's house built by the LMS is still occupied. The town War Memorial was moved down from Letcliffe Park and onto the area of the platform gates.

== Other proposals ==
Several other railways were proposed which would have included a rail link to Barnoldswick.

=== Barnoldswick and Gisburn Light Railway ===
In May 1904, taking advantage of the Light Railways Act 1896 (59 & 60 Vict. c. 48), the Barnoldswick and Gisburn Light Railway Company was formed. This company attempted to obtain powers to build a 3¾ mile single track line from Barnoldswick to connect with the Lancashire and Yorkshire Railways Chatburn to Hellifield line just north of Gisburn. Due to the L&YR refusing to allow a junction near Gisburn the scheme was abandoned. A similar scheme put forward in 1913, but without a connection to the L&YR, failed due to the First World War.

=== Blackburn, Clitheroe & North Western Junction Railway ===
The Blackburn, Clitheroe & North Western Junction Railway was given permission in 1846 to build a railway from Blackburn to Long Preston. The original plan included building a through station at Barnoldswick. This plan was abandoned in favour of the route that is now the Ribble Valley Line.

=== Fleetwood, Preston & West Riding Junction Railway ===
This railway line was proposed to have a through station in Barnoldswick near the junction with the Leeds & Bradford Extension railway in Elslack. This railway was also never built.
