= Elslack Hall =

Historic building in Elslack, England

Coordinates: 53°56′21″N 2°06′38″W

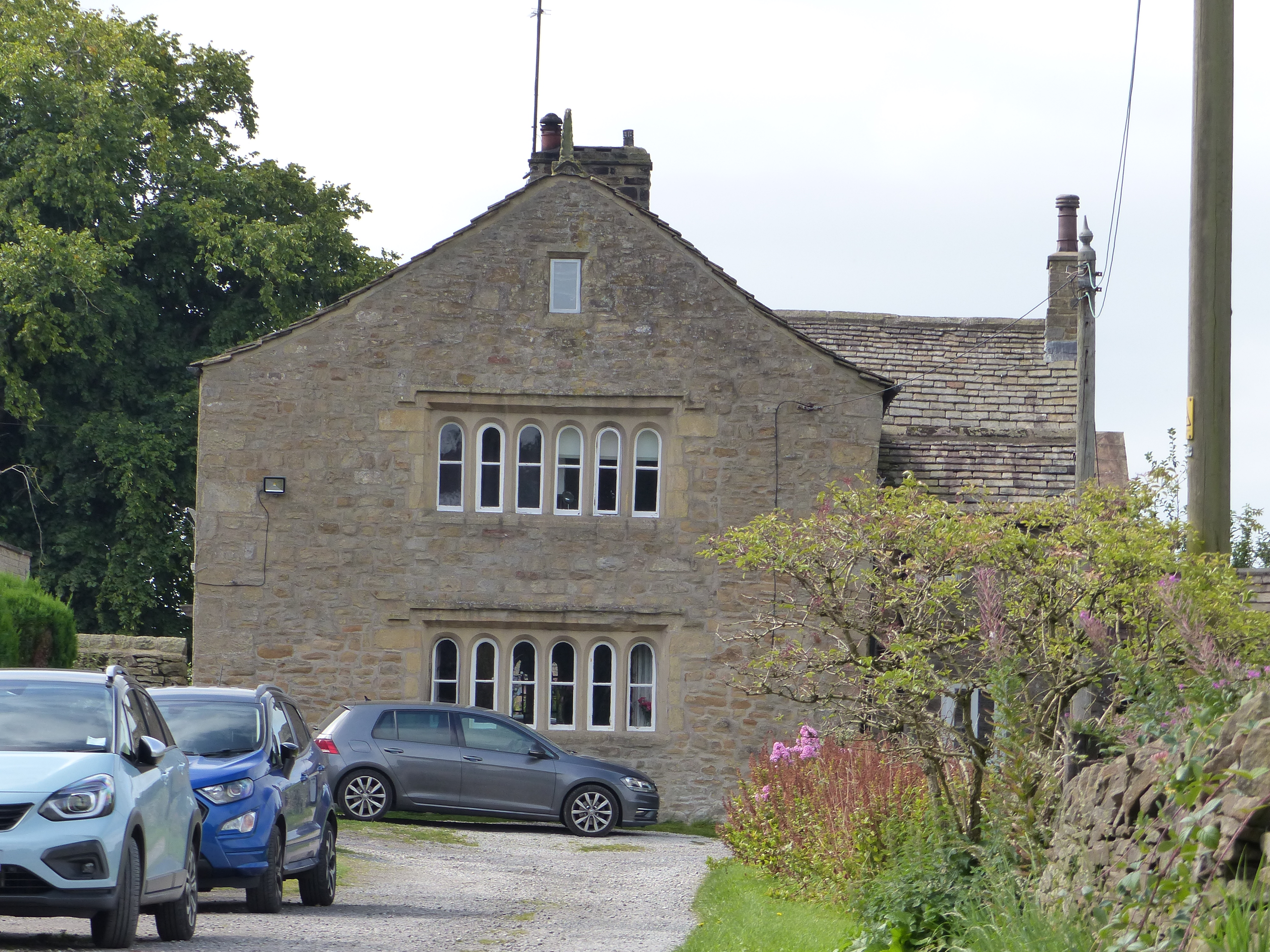
The building, in 2021

Elslack Hall is a historic building in Elslack, a village in North Yorkshire, in England. Today it has been subdivided into a farm house and cottage.

The building may be the successor of a manor house which Godfrey de Altaripa was granted a licence to crenellate in 1318. Remains of a moat are visible around the site, and there are a couple of lancet windows which may have been part of the mediaeval building. The oldest parts of the current house probably date from the 16th century. It was altered in the 18th century, and then suffered a fire in the late 19th century. As a result of the damage, the left rear wing was demolished, and the building was refronted. The house was grade II* listed in 1954. It forms part of the Elslack Estate, which was put up for sale in 2016, with an asking price of £10 million.

The house is built of stone, with quoins and a stone slate roof, one gable with a crocketed finial. There are two storeys, two bays, and a cross-wing on the right. On the front is a two-storey porch and a round-headed doorway with impost blocks and voussoirs. The windows have double-chamferd mullions, and on the gabled end are two six-light windows, each light arched, with hood moulds. Attached to the cross-wing is a garden wall containing two rectangular bee boles with shelves.

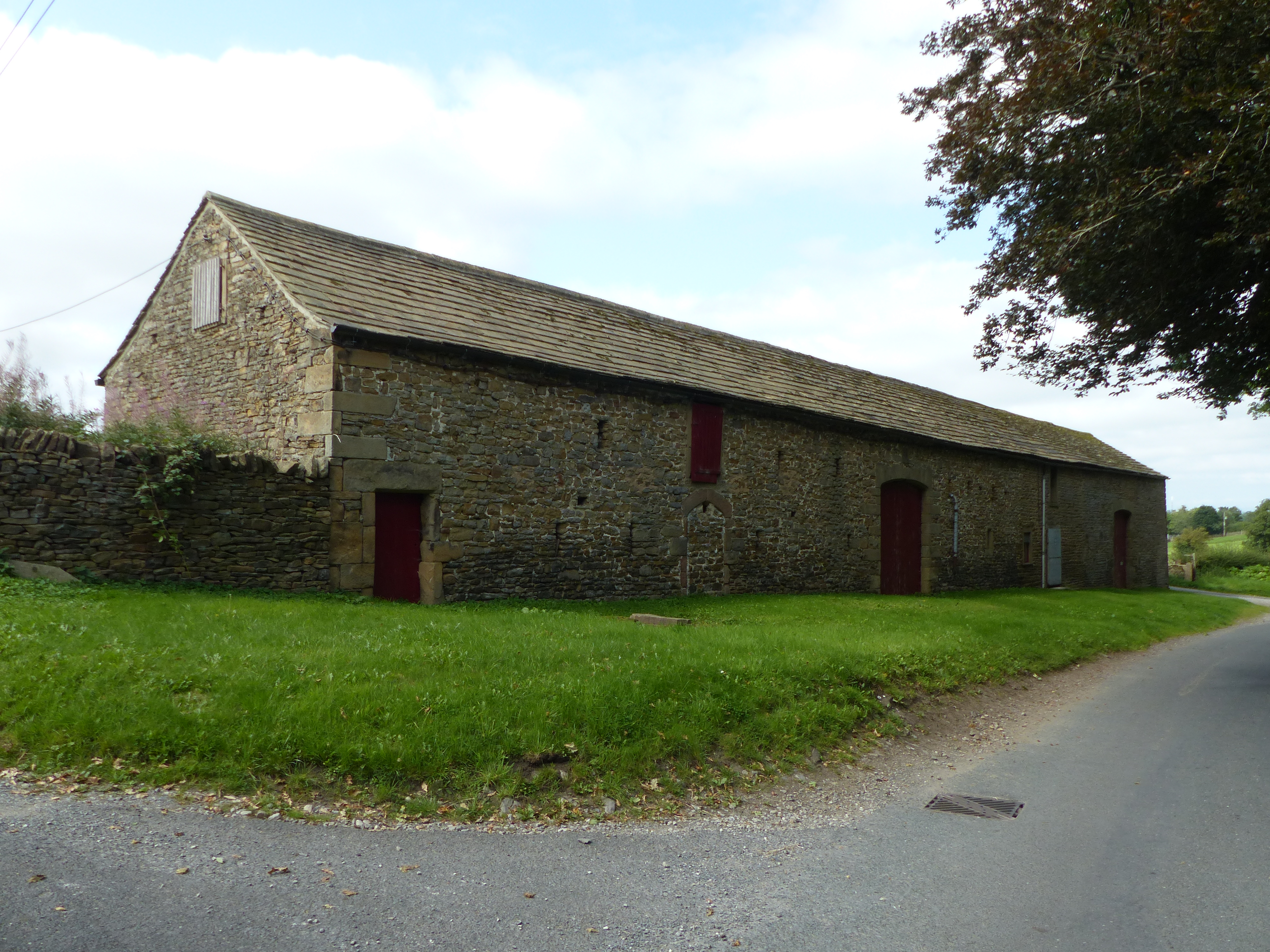
The Great Barn

In front of the house is a great barn, which was constructed in 1672. It is built of stone with quoins and a stone slate roof. It is rectangular, long and narrow. The openings include a doorway with a chamfered surround, a doorway with a Tudor arch, two cart entries with chamfered surrounds and elliptical heads, and vents. Over one cart entry is a dated and initialled stone. It was grade II listed in 1954.

== See also ==
- Grade II* listed buildings in North Yorkshire (district)
- Listed buildings in Elslack
