= Listed buildings in Thornton in Craven =

Thornton in Craven is a civil parish in the county of North Yorkshire, England. It contains 18 listed buildings that are recorded in the National Heritage List for England. Of these, one is listed at Grade I, the highest of the three grades, and the others are at Grade II, the lowest grade. The parish contains the village of Thornton in Craven and the surrounding countryside. The listed buildings include houses and cottages, farmhouses and farm buildings, a church, a set of stocks, a wellhouse, a set of almshouses, two mileposts and a telephone kiosk.

== Key ==
Grade	Criteria
I	Buildings of exceptional interest, sometimes considered to be internationally important
II	Buildings of national importance and special interest

== Buildings ==
Name and location	Photograph	Date	Notes	Grade
St Mary's Church; 53.93116°N 2.15137°W		1510	The church is in stone with a stone slate roof, and consists of a nave, north and south aisles and a chancel under one roof, a south porch and a west tower. The tower is in Perpendicular style, with diagonal buttresses, a three light west window, string courses, three-light louvred bell openings, and an embattled parapet. The windows on the body of the church have straight heads and arched lights, and the east window has five cusped lights.	I
Brown House Farmhouse and barn 53.93183°N 2.12664°W		17th century (probable)	The barn is older than the farmhouse, which probably dates from the late 18th century. They are in stone with a stone slate roof. The house, on the left, has two storeys and two bays, a gabled porch, and three-light mullioned windows. To the right is a long barn containing four doorways with slightly chamfered heads, and chamfered vents.	II
Gubshill Farmhouse and Cottage; 53.94346°N 2.12284°W	—	Late 17th century (probable)	The farmhouse is in stone with a stone slate roof. There are two storeys and five bays. On the ground floor are four mullioned windows with hood moulds, and a doorway with a chamfered surround and a Tudor arch converted into a window. The upper floor contains four mullioned windows.	II
Bells Farmhouse; 53.93336°N 2.14230°W		18th century	The farmhouse is in stone with a stone slate roof. There are two storeys and two bays. In the centre is a gabled porch, and the windows are mullioned with three lights.	II
Elm Tree House; 53.93300°N 2.14324°W		18th century	The house is in stone, with rusticated quoins, a modillion cornice, and a slate roof. There are three storeys and three bays. The central doorway has Tuscan pilasters, impost blocks and an open pediment. The windows on the front are sashes, those in the middle bay with architraves. At the rear are mullion windows and a tall round-headed stair window.	II
Stocks; 53.93256°N 2.14398°W		18th century (probable)	The stocks consist of two round-topped stone uprights with a slab between. Above is a wooden beam with four holes for legs.	II
The Grange; 53.93266°N 2.14465°W	—	1754	A former rectory in stone with rusticated quoins, a modillion cornice, and a hipped stone slate roof. There are two storeys and five bays. The central doorway has pilasters, a deep cornice, and a pediment carried over a round arch with a keystone. This is flanked by large canted bay windows, and the other windows are sashes, the window above the doorway with an architrave. On the northeast front is a Diocletian window, and the southwest front contains a doorway with an inscription and the date in Latin.	II
Church Well; 53.93096°N 2.15190°W		1764	The wellhouse is in stone with a stone slab roof. It has an octagonal plan, with coping and a monolithic circular cap and ball. The coping has an inscription and date in Latin.	II
Fiddling Clough; 53.91785°N 2.11332°W		Late 18th century	A farmhouse, cottage and possible workshop stepped down a hill, all derelict, in stone, the upper two parts with two storeys and the lower part with three. The doorways have plain surrounds, and the windows either have single lights or are mullioned.	II
Nutter Cote; 53.93114°N 2.15964°W	—	Late 18th century (probable)	A laithe house in stone with a stone slate roof and two storeys. It contains a doorway with a hood, and most of the windows are mullioned.	II
Thornton Hall Farmhouse; 53.93096°N 2.14531°W	—	Late 18th century	The farmhouse is in stone with a stone slate roof. There are two storeys and three bays. The doorway has a hood on consoles, and the windows are mullioned.	II
Thornton House; 53.93297°N 2.14240°W		Late 18th century	The house is in stone, with quoins, gutter brackets and a stone slate roof. There are three storeys and three bays. The central doorway has a pediment, and to its left is an embattled canted bay window. Most of the other windows are sashes, on the upper floor are two casement windows, and on the left return is a tall round-arched window.	II
Throstle Nest and Cottage; 53.93329°N 2.14089°W		Late 18th century	The house is in stone, the cottage is roughcast, and they have a stone slate roof. There are three storeys and the house has three bays. The central doorway has an eared architrave and a pediment, and is flanked by square bay windows. The windows on the middle floor are sash windows, and on the top floor they are casements. The windows on the gable end cottage are similar, and elsewhere are mullioned windows with hood moulds.	II
Forge Cottage and Brown Croft; 53.93249°N 2.14345°W		c. 1800	A pair of cottages in stone with a stone slate roof. There are two storeys and four bays. The doorway of the left cottage has a stone surround and a hood, and on the right bay of the right cottage is a projecting gabled porch with the doorway in the left return. The windows in the left bay of the left cottage are sashes, and the others in both cottages are mullioned, apart from two single-light windows on the right cottage.	II
The Almshouses; 53.93176°N 2.14899°W		1815	The almshouses are in stone, with rusticated quoins and a stone slate roof. There is one storey and eleven bays, the middle three bays projecting slightly under a pediment containing an inscribed and dated oval cartouche. Along the front are alternating doorways and sash windows.	II
Milestone south of Gubs Hill; 53.94110°N 2.12138°W		Mid-19th century	The milepost is in cast iron and has a triangular plan and a rounded top. On the top is inscribed "COLNE AND BROUGHTON ROAD" and "THORNTON IN CRAVEN". On the right face is the distance to Skipton, and on the left face the distance to Colne.	II
Milestone by Cam Lane turn 53.93362°N 2.14079°W		Mid-19th century	The milepost is in cast iron and has a triangular plan and a rounded top. On the top is inscribed "COLNE AND BROUGHTON ROAD" and "THORNTON IN CRAVEN". On the right face is the distance to Skipton, and on the left face the distance to Colne.	II
Telephone kiosk 53.93241°N 2.14398°W		1935	The telephone kiosk is of the K6 type designed by Giles Gilbert Scott. Constructed in cast iron with a square plan and a dome, it has three unperforated crowns in the top panels.	II
