= St Mary's Church, Thornton in Craven =

Church in Thornton-in-Craven, North Yorkshire, England

Coordinates: 53.9310°N 2.1513°W

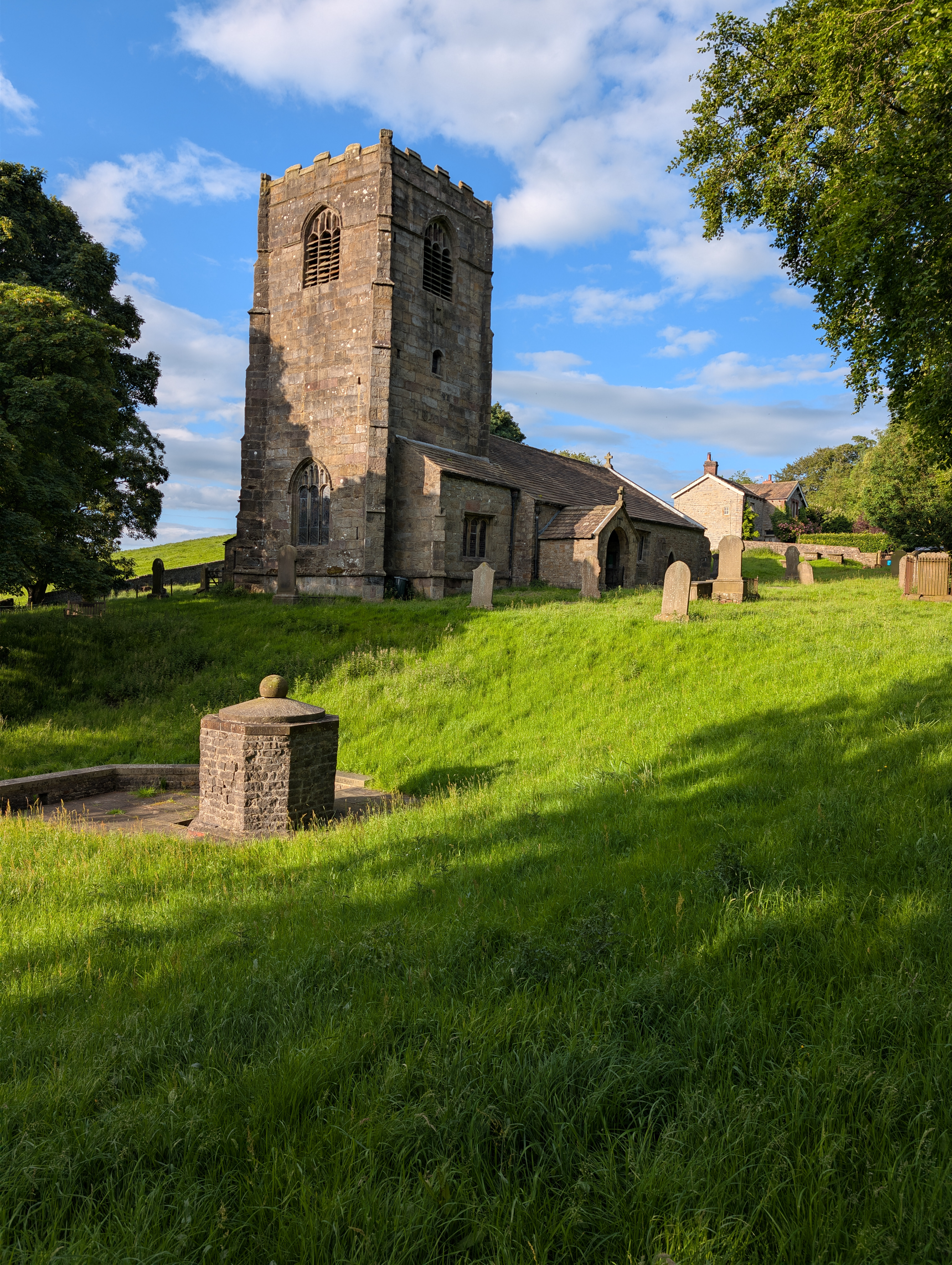
St Mary's Church, Thornton-in-Craven. 2026, by Aaron Massingham

St Mary's Church is the parish church of Thornton in Craven, a village in North Yorkshire, in England.

A church was built in Thornton, probably in the 13th century. It was rebuilt during the reign of Henry VI of England, and a tower was added in 1510. Most of the interior woodwork was replaced around 1900, and in 1898 stained glass by Charles Eamer Kempe was installed in the east window. The church was grade I listed in 1954.

The church is built of stone with a stone slate roof, and consists of a nave, north and south aisles and a chancel under one roof, a south porch and a west tower. The tower is in Perpendicular style, with diagonal buttresses, a three light west window, string courses, three-light louvred bell openings, and an embattled parapet. The windows on the body of the church have straight heads and arched lights, and the east window has five cusped lights. Inside, there is a communion rail dating from around 1700.

== See also ==
- Grade I listed buildings in North Yorkshire (district)
- Listed buildings in Thornton in Craven
