= Listed buildings in Earby =

Earby is a civil parish in Pendle, Lancashire, England. It contains five listed buildings that are recorded in the National Heritage List for England. Of these, one is at Grade II*, the middle grade, and the others are at Grade II, the lowest grade. The parish contains the small town of Earby, and is otherwise rural. The listed buildings comprise two farmhouses, a house in the town, a public house, and a former school.

== Key ==
Grade	Criteria
II*	Particularly important buildings of more than special interest
II	Buildings of national importance and special interest

== Buildings ==
Name and location	Photograph	Date	Notes	Grade
Grammar School; 53.91877°N 2.14333°W		17th century	The former grammar school is in stone with quoins and a stone-slate roof. It has two storeys, and contains mullioned windows. On the front is a two-storey gabled porch with a moulded doorway. Above the doorway is a drip stone with a semicircular rise in the centre. In the gable is a square panel, and on the apex is a finial.	II*
Waddington Farm; 53.91711°N 2.14031°W	—	17th century	Originally one house, later divided into two, it is in stone with quoins and a stone-slate roof. There are two storeys and attics, with paired doorways in the centre and two gables. The windows are mullioned, and include three-light stepped windows in the attics.	II
White Lion Hotel; 53.91545°N 2.14041°W		1681	The public house is in stone, and has a central doorway with a plain surround. The windows are mullioned, and most of the mullions have been retained. In the centre under the eaves is n inscribed panel.	II
North Holme Farmhouse; 53.91434°N 2.14956°W	—	18th century	A stone house with quoins and a stone-slate roof. It has a central doorway flanked by four-light windows. Some of the mullions have been removed.	II
Stanridge Clough Farmhouse; 53.91371°N 2.12344°W	—	18th century	The house is in stone with a stone-slate roof, and has two storeys. The windows are mullioned, and there is a doorway with a plain surround and a modern porch.	II
