= Earby railway station =

Disused railway station in Lancashire, England

Earby
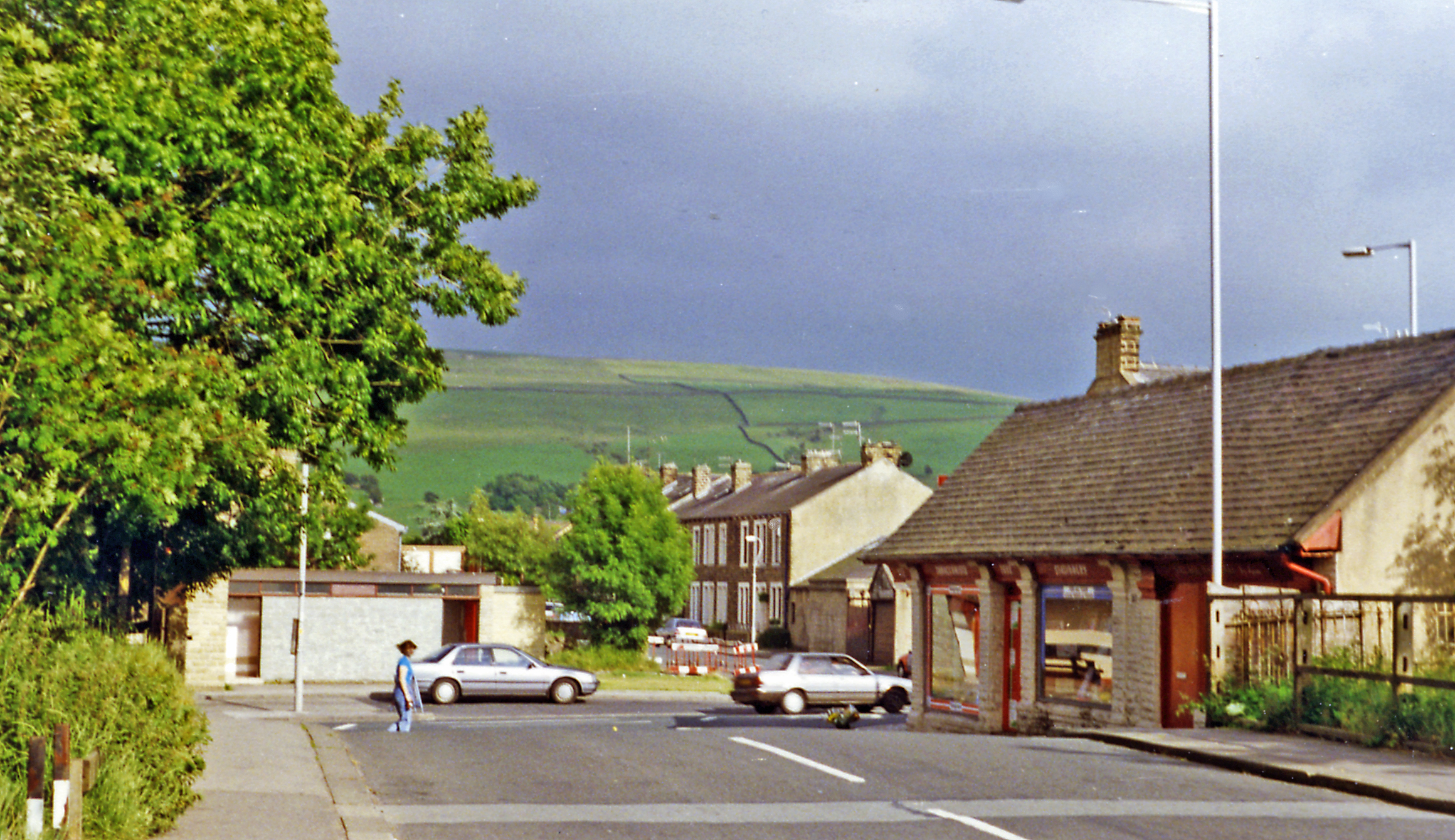
- The site of the station (1996)

General information
- Location: Earby, Pendle, England
- Coordinates: 53.9126°N 2.1478°W
- Platforms: 3

Other information
- Status: Disused

History
- Original company: Leeds and Bradford Extension Railway
- Pre-grouping: Midland Railway
- Post-grouping: London, Midland and Scottish Railway

Key dates
- 2 October 1848: Opened
- 2 February 1970: Closed to passengers
Location

Earby was a junction railway station that served the town of Earby, in the West Riding of Yorkshire, (Note: Since 1974, the town lies within the boundaries of the administrative county of Lancashire.) England, between 1848 and 1970. It was a stop on the Leeds and Bradford Extension Railway and the terminus of a branch line to Barnoldswick.

== History ==
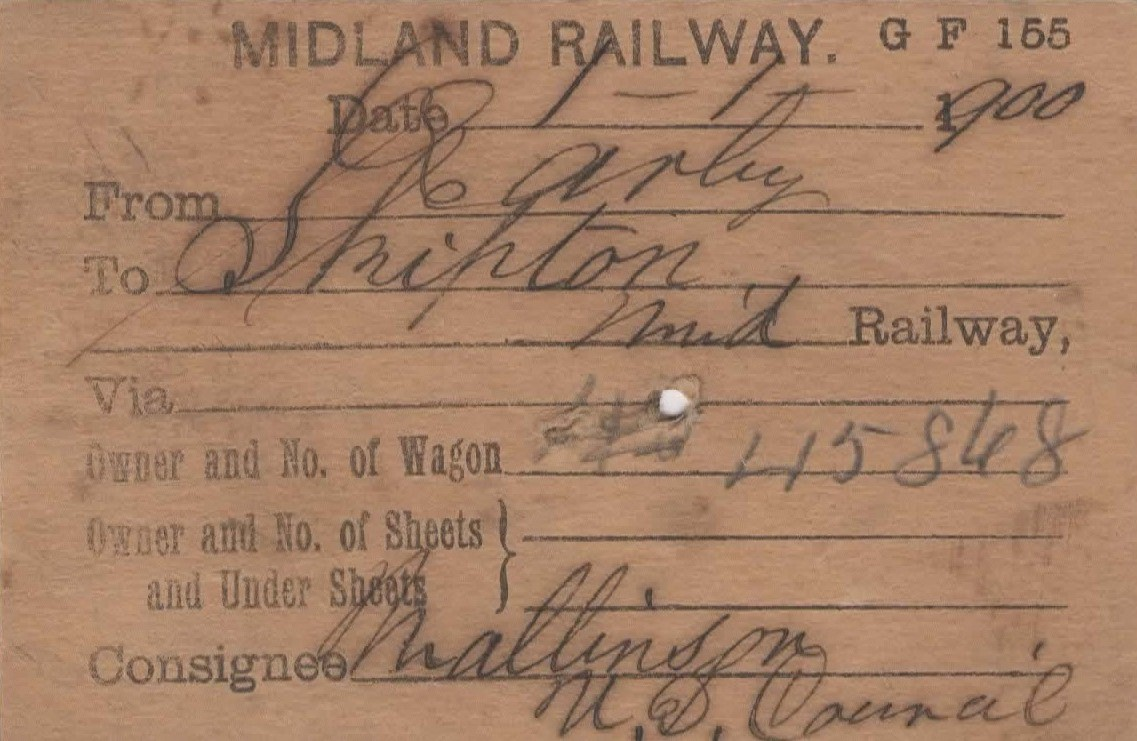
A Midland Railway wagon card for a consignment from Earby to Skipton

The station was built by the Midland Railway, on the former Leeds and Bradford Extension Railway between Skipton and Colne; it opened in 1848.

The main line continued towards Skipton to the north. South of Earby, in the direction of Colne, there was a junction with a short branch towards Barnoldswick. The latter route succumbed to the Beeching Axe in September 1965, but the station remained open until 2 February 1970 when passenger trains between Colne and Skipton were withdrawn and the line wasclosed to all traffic.

The track through the station was lifted the following year, but the platforms and main buildings survived until final demolition in late 1976.

| Preceding station | Disused railways | Following station |
|---|---|---|
| Foulridge | Midland Railway; Leeds and Bradford Extension Railway | Thornton-in-Craven |
| Barnoldswick | Midland Railway; Barnoldswick Railway | Terminus |

== The site today ==
The goods shed and former weighbridge still stand, having been bought by a local engineering company and were adapted for commercial use.

The station site and former railway alignment have been protected from potential redevelopment by Lancashire County Council, pending possible future reinstatement of the route as a transport corridor.

The trackbed is now a shared-use path.
