= Earby =

Town and civil parish in Lancashire, England

Coordinates: 53.914°N 2.144°W

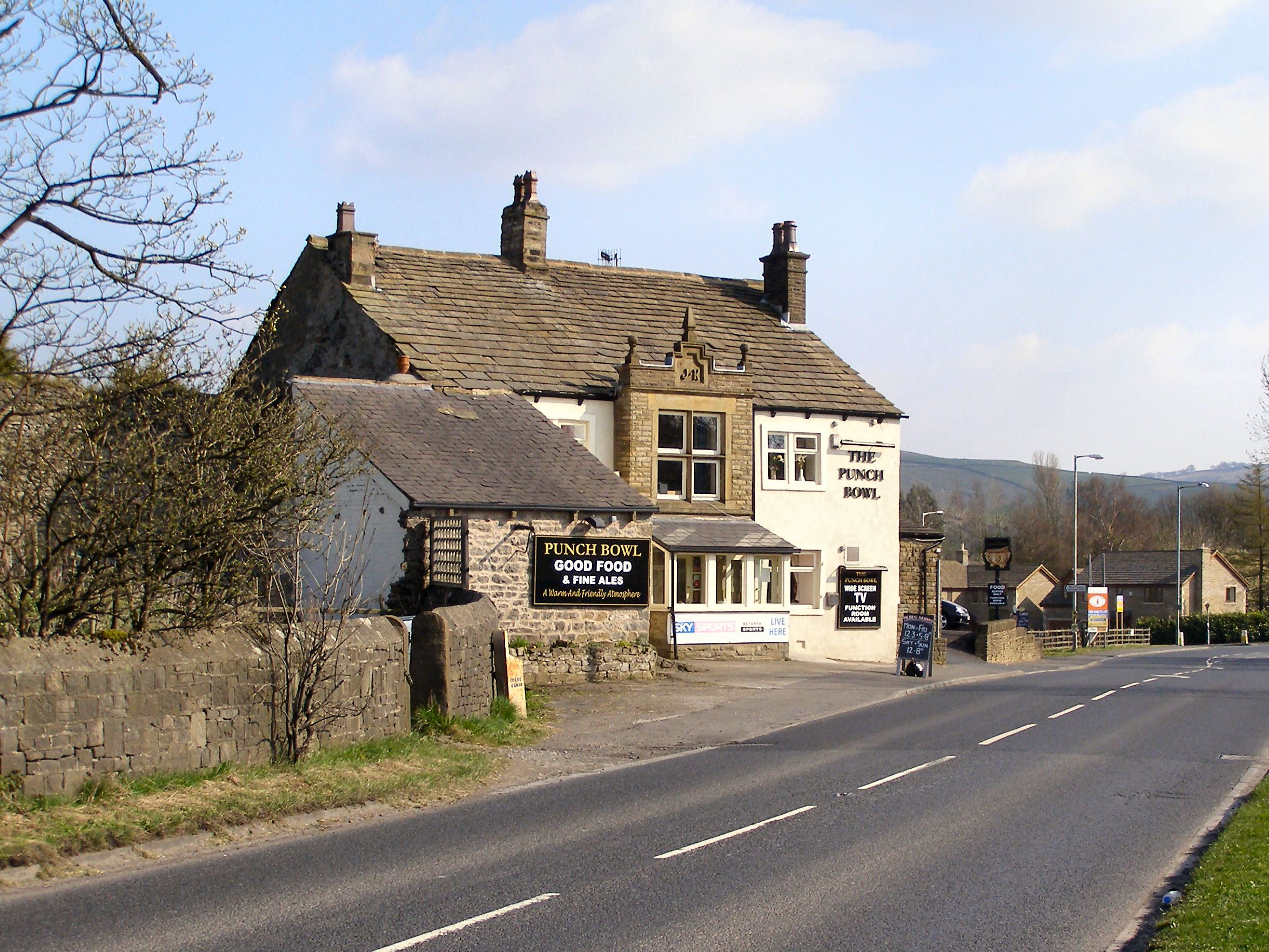
- The Punch Bowl public house, Earby

- Shown within Pendle Borough Location within Lancashire
- Population: 4,538 (2011)
- OS grid reference: SD905464
- Civil parish: Earby
- District: Pendle
- Shire county: Lancashire
- Region: North West
- Country: England
- Sovereign state: United Kingdom
- Post town: BARNOLDSWICK
- Postcode district: BB18
- Dialling code: 01282
- Police: Lancashire
- Fire: Lancashire
- Ambulance: North West
- UK Parliament: Pendle and Clitheroe

Earby is a town and civil parish within the Borough of Pendle, Lancashire, England. Although within the boundaries of the historic West Riding of Yorkshire, Earby has been administered by Lancashire County Council since 1974 and regularly celebrates its Yorkshire roots. It is 5 miles (8 km) north of Colne, 7 miles (11.3 km) south-west of Skipton, and 11 miles (17.7 km) north-east of Burnley. The parish had a population of 4,538 recorded in the 2011 census.

== History ==
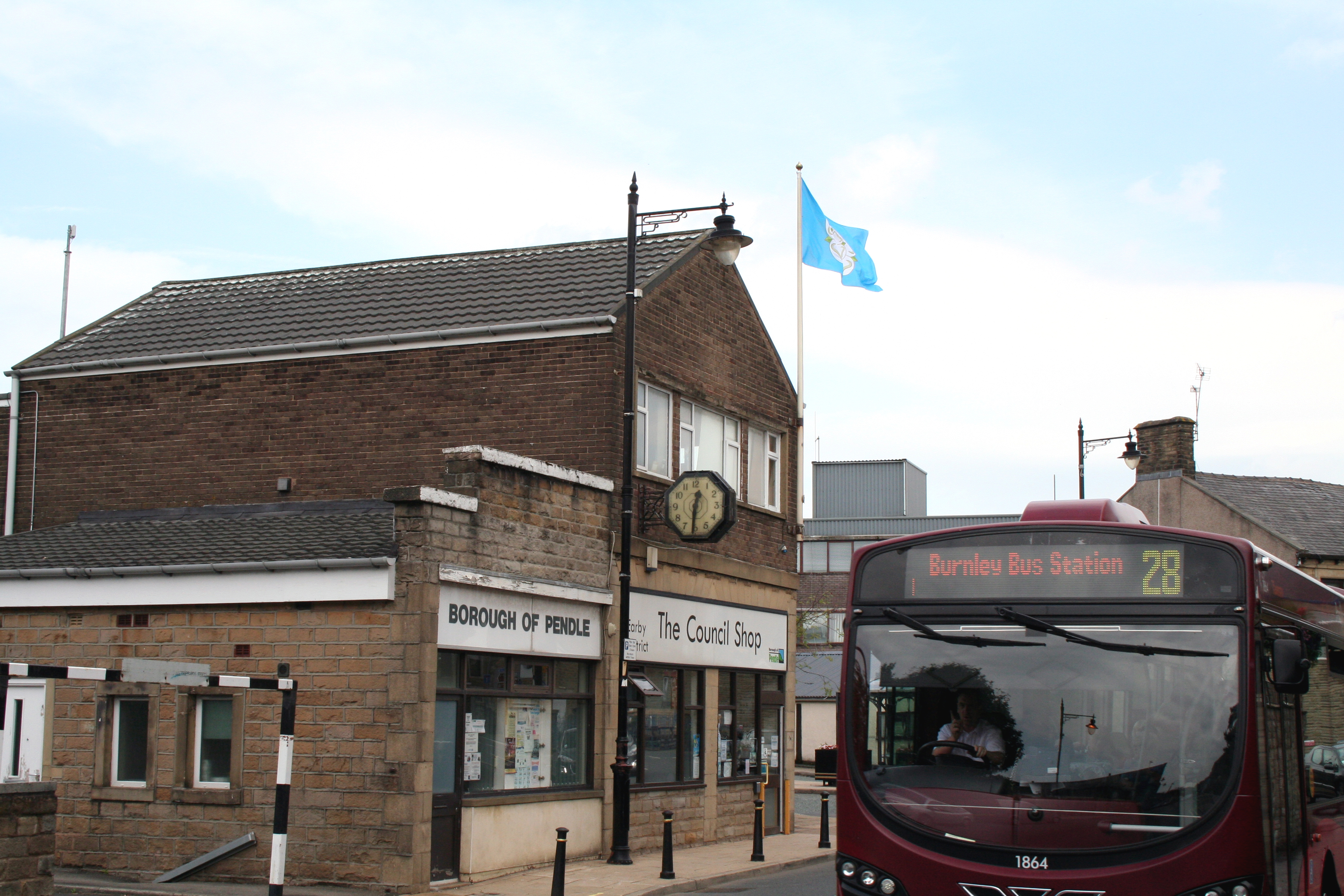
The Yorkshire flag flies at the Council offices in Earby on Yorkshire Day

From 1909 to 1974, Earby formed an urban district. Since 1974, Earby has been in the West Craven area of Pendle, has a town council and is part of the West Craven Area Committee on Pendle Borough Council.

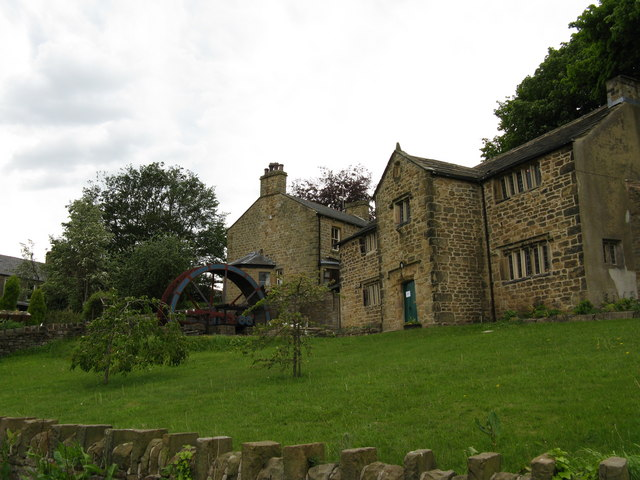
The Old Grammar School

The Yorkshire Dales Lead Mining Museum was based in the old Grade II* listed Grammar School building; it closed in January 2016. The Robert Windle's Foundation, a charity established in the 1600s and original owners of the building, have now taken back control and are working to establish a community hub and café for the benefit of the residents of the locality.

== Transport ==
The town has bus services to Preston and Skipton, operated by Stagecoach Cumbria and North Lancashire, as well as services to Barnoldswick to Burnley provided by the Burnley Bus Company.

Earby railway station once served the town on a route between Colne and Skipton, but it was closed in 1970. The station was an interchange with a small branch to Barnoldswick, which closed five years earlier. Passengers must now travel via Skipton for trains serving North and West Yorkshire or via Colne/Clitheroe for trains serving Lancashire; services are operated by Northern Trains.

== Local media ==
Earby is served by television from both Leeds and Manchester; ITV (Yorkshire Television) and BBC Yorkshire are both transmitted from the television mast at East Marton, 3 miles (4.8 km) north of Earby. BBC North West and ITV (Granada Television) are both received directly from the main Winter Hill transmitter. The BBC has a relay that overlooks Earby and has the four main BBC national FM radio stations (Radio 1 to 4). Fresh Radio in Skipton covers the area .

The local press is published weekly; the Barnoldswick and Earby Times is published on Fridays. Some of the Yorkshire press is circulated in the area – due to the geographical proximity. The Craven Herald & Pioneer and Yorkshire Post are prominent.

In terms of BBC Local Radio, Earby is covered by BBC Radio Lancashire. Other radio stations including Capital Manchester and Lancashire (formerly 2BR)and Central Radio North West.

In 2012, a local radio station was broadcast for the first time: West Craven Community Radio, an online based station serving the community of West Craven area of Pendle and beyond. The station, run by non-paid volunteers, was originally broadcast three days a week. In December 2012, it was broadcasting on four days a week including Friday evenings. In 2013, it was hoping to raise enough money for an FM licence from Ofcom.

== See also ==
- Listed buildings in Earby
