= Foulridge railway station =

Railway station in Lancashire, England

Foulridge
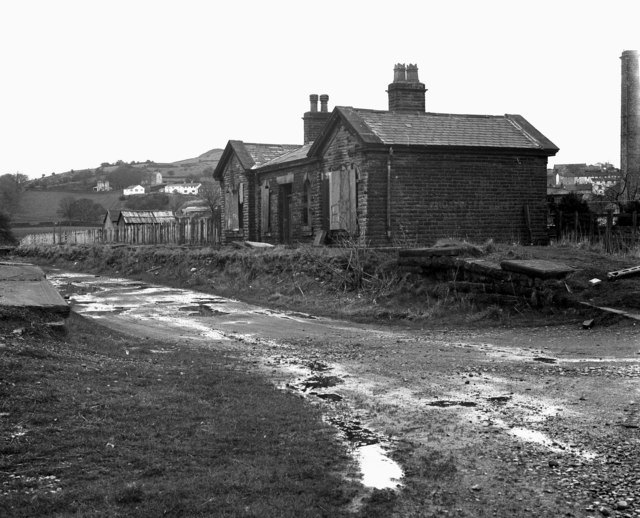
- The station after closure and lifting of the track

General information
- Location: Foulridge, Pendle, Lancashire; England
- Coordinates: 53.8785°N 2.1736°W
- Platforms: 2

Other information
- Status: Disused

History
- Original company: Leeds and Bradford Extension Railway
- Pre-grouping: Midland Railway
- Post-grouping: London, Midland and Scottish Railway

Key dates
- 2 October 1848: Opened
- 5 January 1959: Closed to passengers
Location

Foulridge railway station served the village of Foulridge in Lancashire, England between 1848 and 1959. It was a stop on the Skipton-Colne line.

== History ==
It was built by the Leeds and Bradford Extension Railway, which was later absorbed by the Midland Railway. It opened on 2 October 1848 on the section between Colne and Skipton.

The station closed on 5 January 1959. The station building was subsequently dismantled brick-by-brick and re-erected at Ingrow West railway station on the heritage Keighley and Worth Valley Railway.

The line serving it remained in use until 2 February 1970, when it was closed to all traffic. The trackbed is now a shared-use path.

Preceding station	Disused railways	Following station
Colne	Midland Railway; Leeds and Bradford Extension Railway	Earby
