= Elslack railway station =

Disused railway station in North Yorkshire, England

Elslack
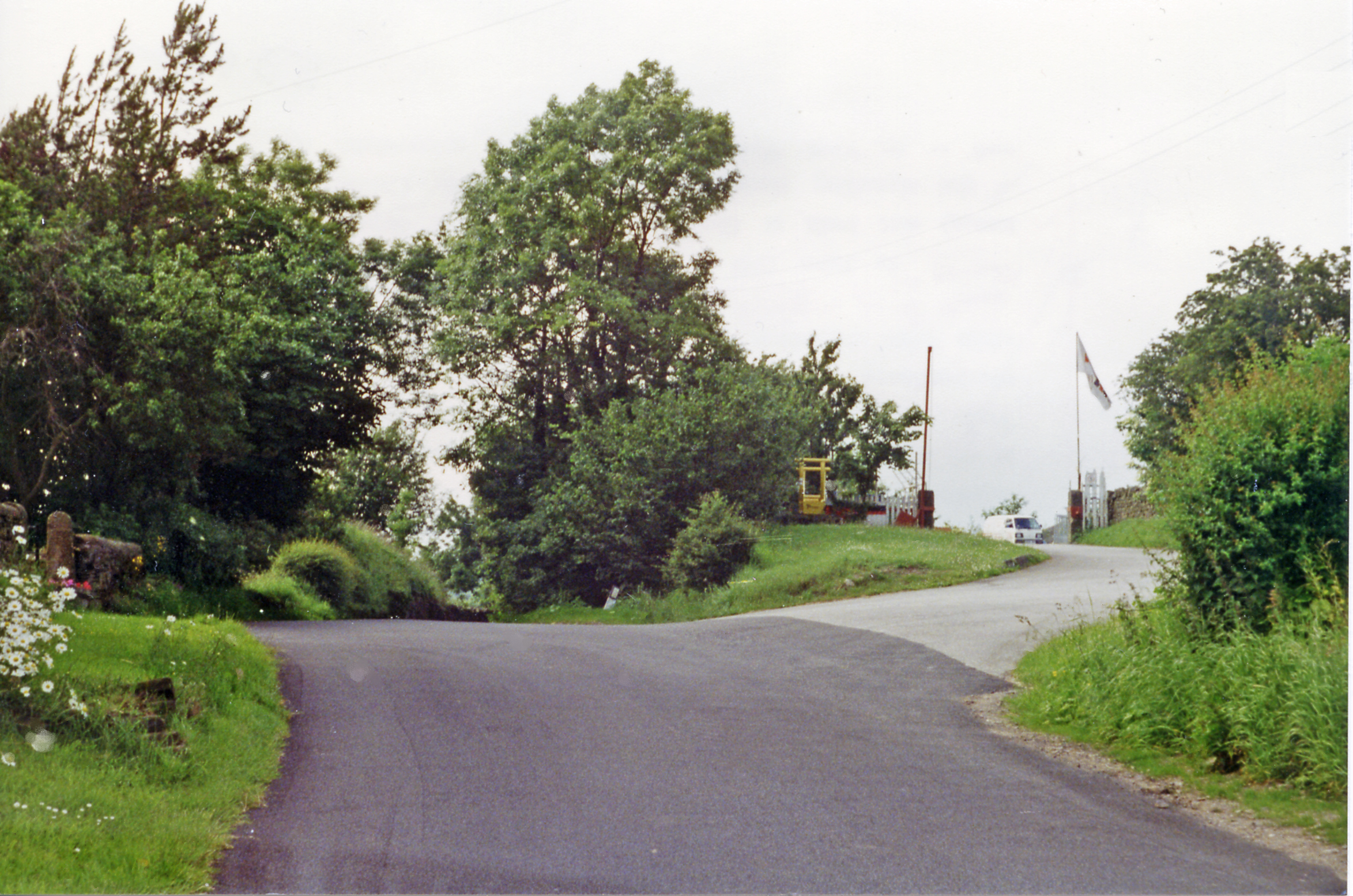
- Site of the former station (1996)

General information
- Location: Elslack, North Yorkshire, England
- Coordinates: 53.9422°N 2.1126°W
- Grid reference: SD927495
- Platforms: 2

Other information
- Status: Disused

History
- Original company: Leeds and Bradford Extension Railway
- Pre-grouping: Midland Railway
- Post-grouping: London, Midland and Scottish Railway

Key dates
- 3 November 1848: Opened
- 3 March 1952: Closed to passengers
Location

Elslack railway station served the small village of Elslack, in North Yorkshire, England. It was sited between Colne and Skipton, on the Leeds and Bradford Extension Railway, operating between 1848 and 1952.

== History ==
The station was built by the Leeds and Bradford Extension Railway in 1848, which was merged into the Midland Railway in 1851; however, some services were operated by the Lancashire and Yorkshire Railway.

The station was closed on 3 March 1952, followed by the rest of the line on 2 February 1970.

| Preceding station | Disused railways | Following station |
|---|---|---|
| Thornton-in-Craven | Midland Railway; Leeds and Bradford Extension Railway | Skipton |

== The site today ==
The station buildings have since been demolished, but fragments of the former up platform remain. The trackbed leading away to the south-west of the site, is now a shared-use path.
