= The Good Pub Guide =

Guide to public houses in the United Kingdom

The Good Pub Guide was, until 2021, a long-running critical publication which listed and rated public houses (pubs) in the United Kingdom.

== History ==
Published by Random House's Ebury Publishing subsidiary since 1982, it is released annually in book form and, since 2009, online until 2021.

By 2009, the book form guide contained over 5,000 of pubs based upon food, drink, and atmosphere. There were 1,140 fully inspected main entries and 1,931 entries recommended by readers which had yet to be inspected. In addition, the website contained a list of 55,000 pubs. The last edition published was 2021.

== Guide categorisations ==
Pubs receive a categorisation according to the findings of a GPG inspection. In order of the highest rating first, they are:

- Approved: a pub which has been fully inspected by GPG staff and has attained the highest standard.
- Recommended: a pub which has been fully inspected by GPG staff and has attained a high standard.
- Lucky Dip: a pub which has been recommended for inclusion by several readers, but has not yet been assessed by GPG staff.

== See also ==
- List of public house topics
- The Good Food Guide
