= Little Cut =

British branch canal

The Little Cut
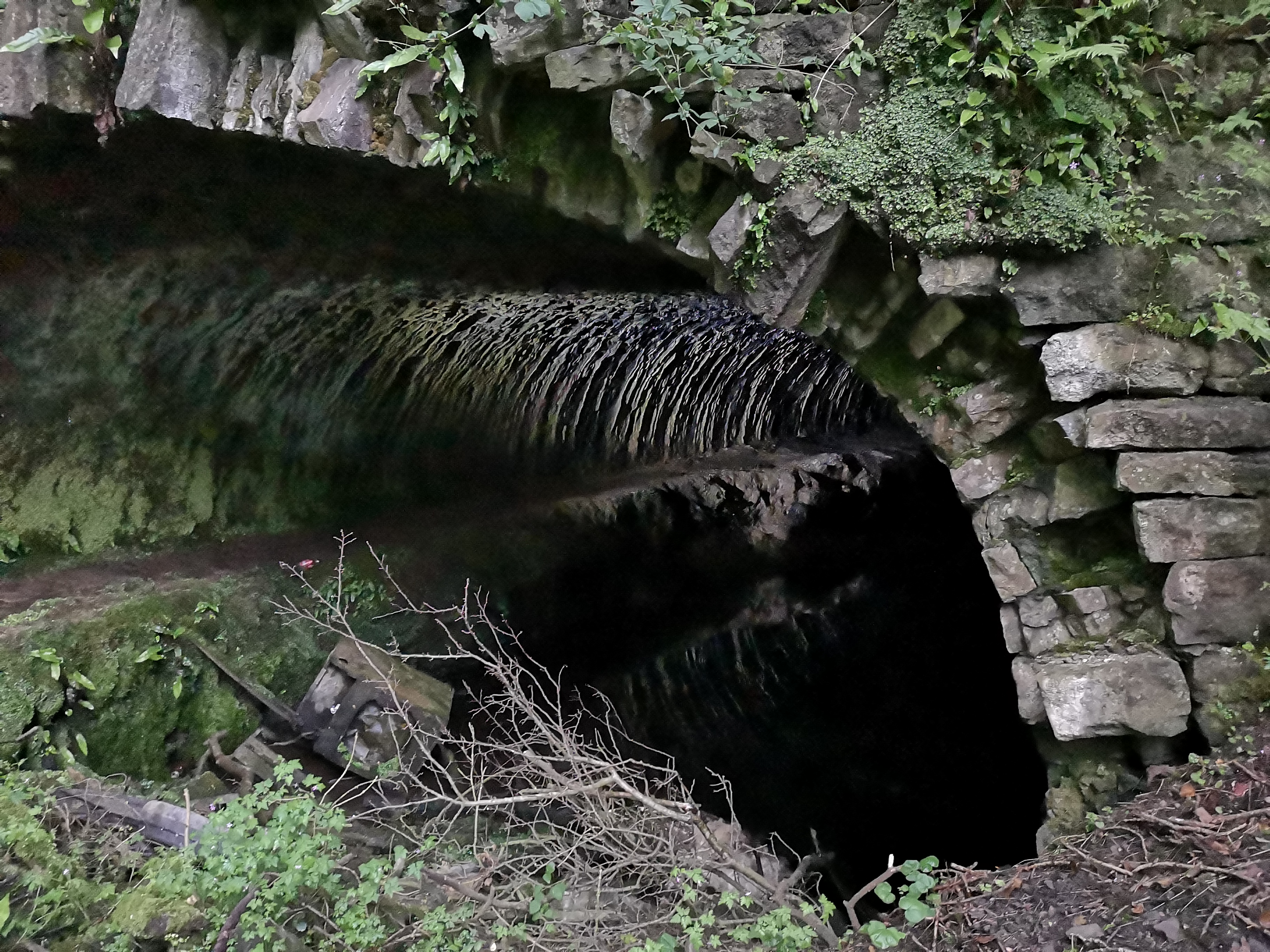
- The northwest entrance to the Barnsay Tunnel
- Interactive map of The Little Cut
- Location: Barnoldswick, Lancashire
- Country: United Kingdom
- Coordinates: 53.9188°N 2.1724°W

Specifications
- Length: 0.53 miles (0.85 km)
- Locks: 0
- Status: Infilled

History
- Original owner: Leeds and Liverpool Canal Company
- Construction began: 1796
- Date extended: 1799, 1828
- Date closed: c. 1918

Geography
- Branch of: Leeds and Liverpool Canal

The Little Cut, also known as the Rain Hall Rock Branch or the Rain Hall Rock Canal, was a short canal connecting the Leeds and Liverpool Canal at Barnoldswick to the nearby Rain Hall Rock limestone quarry. The canal ran north-east for 950 yards (870 m) through farmland and a deep cutting—including two tunnels—before terminating in a small basin.

== Canal ==
The cut was constructed in 1796, around the time of the second phase of the Leeds and Liverpool Canal. Built to serve a limestone quarry known as Rain Hall Rock, the cut left the main canal beneath a small bridge carrying the towing path, approximately 220 yards (200 m) south of Long Ing Bridge. The short length of the canal led to it being named locally as the "Little Cut", although it was formally known as the Rain Hall Rock Canal or Rain Hall Rock Branch.

A 90-yard (82 m) tunnel was bored through the limestone near Higher Barnsay Farm, before a northwards bend took the canal through a deep cutting; this was the start of the quarry and the original canal terminus, 1/4 mile (0.40 km) from its junction with the main line. This tunnel was the only tunnel on the Leeds and Liverpool Canal to carry the towpath as well as the waterway. From the canal's junction with the main line, the towpath ran along the south side of the channel. Upon reaching the second tunnel, a turnover bridge moved the towpath to the north side of the canal.

Permission to extend the quarry was granted in 1826 and the canal was extended through a second tunnel. A further extension had been made by 1862, when a viaduct was built (as an accommodation bridge) across the cut. Rather than building a large wharf or dock, limestone was loaded directly from the quarry into waiting barges in a widened basin.

The quarry closed around the end of the First World War, and later the cut was used by Lancashire County Council for landfill. Only the central cutting—between the two tunnels—as well as parts of the tunnels are extant.

== Quarry ==
Rock from the quarry has been classified by the British Geological Survey as nodular micaceous sandy limestone, with some specimens containing forams.
