= West Craven High School =

West Craven High School may refer to:

- West Craven High School, Barnoldswick, a secondary school in Barnoldswick, Lancashire, England
- West Craven High School (Vanceboro, North Carolina), a high school in Vanceboro, North Carolina, United States
