= Stock Beck =

River in Lancashire, England

Coordinates: 53.9440°N 2.2672°W

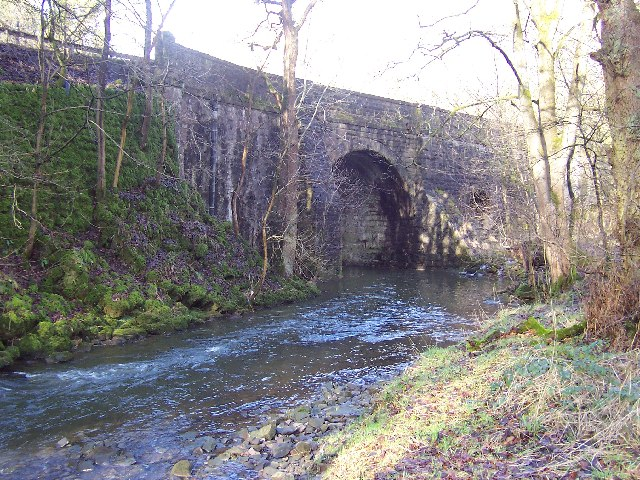
- The bridge over Stock Beck north of Gisburn

Location
- Country: England

Physical characteristics
- Source
  - location: Weets Hill near Barnoldswick
- Mouth
  - location: River Ribble at Gisburn
- Length: 13.27 km (8.25 mi)

Stock Beck is a minor river in the West Craven area of Pendle, Lancashire (formerly in Yorkshire). It is 8.25 miles (13.27 km) long and has a catchment area of 14.41 square miles (3,731.89 ha).

== Course ==
Rising as Calf Hall Beck near Higher Laithe Farm on Weets Hill it flows north east into Barnoldswick, where it meets Gillians Beck and turns north becoming known as Butts Beck. Stock Beck leaves the town before heading northwest to meet Fools Syke and then Hell Forest Dike near Gilbeber Hill. After passing under the Monks Bridge on the A59 road at Horton it collects Horton Beck and heads west. It meets Flush Beck and then Bottom Beck near the hamlet of Bracewell. After the confluence with Spittle Syke, it passes under the Stock Beck viaduct on the Ribble Valley line and the A682 Long Preston road, north of the village Gisburn and joins the River Ribble at Gisburne Park.

== Tributaries ==
- Spittle Syke
- Horton Beck
- Bottom Beck
  - Lodge Hill Syke
    - Old Park Syke
      - Wedacre Syke
      - Hesketh Rough Syke
- Flush Beck
- Hell Forest Dike
  - Turpit Gate Syke
  - Hayfield Dike
    - Tosber Syke
- Fools Syke
  - Ray Gill Water
    - Ray Gill
  - Horrox Gill
- Crownest Syke
- Gillians Beck
  - Moor Side Beck

Next confluence upstream	River Ribble	Next confluence downstream
-	Stock Beck	Skirden Beck (North)
