= Listed buildings in Barnoldswick =

Barnoldswick is a civil parish in Pendle, Lancashire, England. It contains 27 listed buildings that are recorded in the National Heritage List for England. Of these, one is listed at Grade I, the highest of the three grades, two are at Grade II*, the middle grade, and the others are at Grade II, the lowest grade.

The parish contains the town of Barnoldswick and surrounding countryside. Most of the listed buildings are houses, farmhouses, and farm buildings, some of which have been absorbed by the expanding town. The Leeds and Liverpool Canal runs through the parish, and bridges and locks associated with it are listed. The other listed buildings include churches and an associated structures, a public house, and a milestone.

== Key ==
Grade	Criteria
I	Buildings of exceptional interest, sometimes considered to be internationally important
II*	Particularly important buildings of more than special interest
II	Buildings of national importance and special interest

== Buildings ==
Name and location	Photograph	Date	Notes	Grade
Church of St Mary-le-Gill; 53.92818°N 2.16446°W		15th century (probable)	The church contains some 13th-century remains, and the tower is dated 1524. It is in stone with a stone-slate roof, and consists of a nave and chancel under one roof, a south aisle, a south porch, and a west tower. The tower has a west window, diagonal buttresses, a stair tower, gargoyles, and an embattled parapet. Inside the church are a full set of box pews, and a three-decker pulpit.	I
Gill Hall; 53.92995°N 2.16443°W	—	17th century	A stone house with quoins and a stone-slate roof in two storeys. There are two five-light windows with mullions and transoms on each floor, and a transomed window between. The doorway has a four-centred arch in a square moulded surround. There are finials on the gables.	II
Hen House Farmhouse; 53.92128°N 2.19310°W	—	17th century	The farmhouse is in stone with a stone-slate roof in two storeys. The doorway has a plain surround. Most of the mullions have been removed from the ground floor windows, and the windows in the upper floor are 18th-century casements.	II
Milestone; 53.92498°N 2.19420°W	—	17th century	Th milestone is in the garden of Lane End Farmhouse. It is a rectangular stone pillar about 2 feet 6 inches (0.76 m) high. The milestone is inscribed on three faces indicating the distances in miles to other towns, but is weathered and difficult to decipher.	II
Mill Close Farmhouse; 53.92336°N 2.18853°W	—	17th century	A stone house with a stone-slate roof in two storeys. The windows are mullioned, and the central doorway has a plain surround.	II
West Close Farmhouse; 53.92437°N 2.19052°W	—	17th century	The farmhouse is in stone with a stone-slate roof, and is in two storeys. On the front is a two-storey porch wing. Most of the mullions have been removed, and the doorway has a plain surround.	II
Barn, Higher Park Farm; 53.90816°N 2.17926°W	—	1692	The barn is in stone with a stone-slate roof, and on the front is a gabled projection. It contains a wagon entrance with a segmental head, two doorways with chamfered heads, ventilation holes, a dated plaque, and external steps leading to a first floor doorway.	II
Fosters Arms Public House; 53.92362°N 2.19417°W		1699	The public house is in stone with a stone-slate roof in two storeys, The windows are mullioned with moulded dripstones. The doorway has an architrave and hood. At the rear is an extension, originally a cottage, dated 1688.	II
Bridge Holme Laithe; 53.92613°N 2.18714°W	—	Late 17th or early 18th century	A stone barn and shippon with a slab roof in a shallow L-shaped plan. It contains a wagon entrance that has an elliptical arch and a keystone. There are two doorways, one of which has a round head.	II
Hey Farmhouse; 53.91231°N 2.18783°W		Late 17th or early 18th century	The house is in stone with a stone-slate roof in two storeys. Some of the windows are mullioned, others are modern replacements. On the front is a modern porch. The right return contains a dovecote in the gable.	II
13 and 15 King Street; 53.91525°N 2.18848°W	—	1714	Originally one house, later divided into two dwellings, the building is in stone and partly rendered. There are four gables facing the street. At the rear is a door with a cornice above which is a dated panel.	II
Coates Hall; 53.92269°N 2.17723°W		Early 18th century	A large stone house with a stone-slate roof, in three storeys and with a symmetrical seven bay front. The outer two bays on each side project forward and are gabled, as is the central section. The house contains cross windows with mullions and architraves, an oculus in each gable, and a ball finial on each apex. The doorway has pairs of fluted composite columns, and a pediment with a moulded frieze.	II*
Old Chapel House; 53.91491°N 2.19078°W	—	Mid to late 18th century	Originally a chapel. later converted for other uses. It is in stone with quoins and has two storeys. There is a central doorway with engaged Tuscan columns and an open pediment. The windows were originally Venetian in style, and some have been altered.	II
Greenberfield Farmhouse; 53.92890°N 2.17577°W		Late 18th century	The farmhouse contains some 17th-century material. It is in stone with a stone-slate roof, and has two storeys and three bays. The windows are mullioned with architraves, and contain sashes. The doorway has a moulded triangular hood on brackets.	II
Lane End Farmhouse; 53.92504°N 2.19435°W	—	Late 18th century	The house is in stone with a stone-slate roof, and has two storeys. It contains five-light mullioned windows and a central doorway with a plain surround and s peaked head.	II
Cockshott Bridge (No 152); 53.91206°N 2.17440°W		1794	An accommodation bridge over the Leeds and Liverpool Canal. It is in stone, and consists of a single elliptical arch with voussoirs. The bridge has a solid parapet and curving abutments ending in piers.	II
Greenberfield Bridge (No 156); 53.92911°N 2.17401°W		1794	The bridge carries Coates Lane over the Leeds and Liverpool Canal. It is in stone, and consists of a single elliptical arch with rusticated voussoirs. The bridge has a solid parapet and curving abutments ending in piers.	II
Haystacks Bridge; 53.92981°N 2.17186°W		1794	The bridge carries Greenberfield Lane over the former course of the Leeds and Liverpool Canal. It is in stone, and consists of a single elliptical arch, now blocked, with rusticated voussoirs. The bridge has a solid parapet and curving abutments ending in piers.	II
Newfield Edge; 53.91194°N 2.19502°W	—	c. 1800	A stone house with a blue slate roof in two storeys and three bays. The windows are sashes, and the doorway has a moulded architrave, a plain frieze, a cornice, and a radial fanlight.	II
Greenberfield Locks Bridge (No. 157); 53.92978°N 2.16998°W		1817	The bridge carries Greenberfield Lane over the Leeds and Liverpool Canal. It is in stone, and consists of a single elliptical arch with rusticated voussoirs and keystones. The bridge has a solid parapet and curving abutments ending in rusticated piers.	II
Greenberfield Lock, (Lock No 42); 53.93199°N 2.16913°W		1817	The lock is in stone with timber gates. The retaining walls curve outwards at the ends, and there is ramped coping at the lower end.	II
Greenberfield Lock, (Lock No 43); 53.93045°N 2.16974°W		1817	The lock is in stone with timber gates. The retaining walls curve outwards at the ends, and there is ramped coping at the lower end.	II
Greenberfield Lock, (Lock No 44); 53.92941°N 2.17196°W		1817	The lock is in stone with timber gates. The retaining walls curve outwards at the ends, and there is ramped coping at the lower end.	II
Watch house 53.92787°N 2.16470°W		1824	The watch house (or hearse house) is in the churchyard of the Church of St Mary-le-Gill. It is a simple stone structure with quoins and a stone-slate roof. It contains a doorway with a pointed arch, beside which is an inscribed plaque.	II
16–26 Town Head; 53.91339°N 2.19391°W		1829	A terrace of six stone cottages with stone-slate roofs in two storeys. No, 16 at the left is higher and larger than the others; it has a central doorway with pilasters, a cornice, and a frieze. In the upper floor is a moulded and inscribed panel. The doors and windows in the other cottages have peaked hoods.	II
Barn, Mill Close Farm; 53.92344°N 2.18834°W	—	1829	The barn is in stone with a stone-slate roof. It contains a doorway with a segmental arch, above which is an inscribed plaque. In the eaves are two circular bullseye windows.	II
Independent Methodist Church; 53.91466°N 2.19046°W		1892	The church has a symmetrical two-storey front with a pediment and an urn finial. In the centre are two doors with fanlights, four partly fluted Corinthian pilasters, a decorated inscribed frieze, and a balustrade. The ground floor windows have segmental heads, and in the upper floor they have round arches. The steps and railings in front of the church are included in the listing.	II*
