= Listed buildings in Bracewell and Brogden =

Bracewell and Brogden is a civil parish in Pendle, Lancashire, England. It contains eleven listed buildings that are recorded in the National Heritage List for England. Of these, one is listed at Grade I, the highest of the three grades, and the others are at Grade II, the lowest grade. The parish is almost completely rural, and most of the listed buildings are farmhouses and farm buildings. The remaining listed buildings are other houses and a church.

== Key ==
| Grade | Criteria |
|---|---|
| I | Buildings of exceptional interest, sometimes considered to be internationally important |
| II | Buildings of national importance and special interest |

== Buildings ==
| Name and location | Photograph | Date | Notes | Grade |
|---|---|---|---|---|
| St Michael's Church; 53.93199°N 2.21008°W | | 1143 | Most of the fabric now in the church dates from the 15th or early 16th century. It is in stone with a stone-slate roof, and consists of a nave and chancel under one roof, a north aisle, a south porch, and a west tower. The tower has two stages, and a corbelled embattled parapet. The south doorway is Norman in style. Inside the church is a Norman font and a Jacobean pulpit. | I |
| Barn, Bracewell Hall; 53.93164°N 2.21077°W | — | 15th century | The barn was probably adapted from a house. It is in stone with a stone-slate roof. Its features include a large cart entrance with a segmental head, windows (one blocked) with ogee heads, one jamb of a chamfered doorway, and massive corbels. (Note: The building is said to be a hall in which Henry VI rested following the battle of Hexham.) | II |
| Lower Calf Hall Farmhouse; 53.91401°N 2.19945°W | — | 17th century | A stone house with a stone-slate roof that was altered in the 18th century. It has two storeys, and a stepped chimney breast at the right end. Most of the mullions have been removed from the windows, those in the ground floor having chamfered surrounds and moulded dripstones. | II |
| Turpit Gate House Farmhouse; 53.94297°N 2.19853°W | — | 17th century | The house is in stone with a stone-slate roof and has two storeys. There are three windows with chamfered surrounds that have lost their mullions, and one sash window. The doorway has a plain surround. | II |
| Wedacre Farmhouse; 53.92994°N 2.24012°W | — | 17th century | A stone house with a stone-slate roof in two storeys. Some of the windows have lost their mullions, and there is a staircase window between the storeys. There are dripmoulds above all the openings. | II |
| Yarlside Farmhouse and barn 53.93859°N 2.21712°W | — | Early 18th century | The house and barn are in stone with a stone-slate roof. The house has two storeys, mullioned windows, and a square-headed doorway. Attached to the barn is an outshut with a catslide roof, and the windows are casements. | II |
| Hopwood Farmhouse; 53.93212°N 2.20918°W | — | 18th century | The house is in stone with a stone-slate roof, and has a crow-stepped gable on the right side. It has two storeys, and the original part is in two bays. These bays contain three-light mullioned windows with sashes, and a central doorway with a plain surround. To the left is a later bay with sash windows. | II |
| Manor House; 53.91909°N 2.22240°W | — | Mid 18th century | A stone house with a stone-slate roof in two storeys and three bays. In the centre of the front away from the road is a doorway with Tuscan pilasters and a pediment. All the windows are mullioned. In the centre bay of the rear face is a blocked bullseye window and a round-headed staircase window. | II |
| Jack House; 53.91401°N 2.21854°W | — | Late 18th century | A stone house with a stone-slate roof, it has two doorways with plain surrounds. Most of the windows are sashes, and there is a round-headed mullioned and transomed staircase window at the rear. | II |
| New House Farmhouse; 53.93344°N 2.21391°W | — | Early 19th century (probable) | The house is in stone with a stone-slate roof, it has two storeys with an attic, and a symmetrical three-bay front. The windows are sashes, those in the ground floor having three lights. The central doorway has a moulded architrave and arched drip moulding. In front of the house are a gate and railings in iron, and stone gate piers. | II |
| Hopwood House; 53.93208°N 2.20929°W | — | Mid 19th century | The house is in stone with a blue slate roof, and has two storeys and three bays. The windows are two-light sashes, and the doorway has a two-light fanlight; all these have Tudor arched heads. On the right return is a canted bay window over which are crenellated mouldings. In the left return is an ornamental door surround, partly blocked and forming a window. | II |

== Notes and references ==
Notes

Citations

Sources

- Church of England, Bracewell: St Michael, Bracewell
- Historic England, "Church of St Michael, Bracewell and Brogden (1259162)", National Heritage List for England
- Historic England, "Barn incorporating remains of King Henry's Parlour, Bracewell Hall, Bracewell and Brogden (1073405)", National Heritage List for England
- Historic England, "Lower Calf Hall Farmhouse, Bracewell and Brogden (1361697)", National Heritage List for England
- Historic England, "Turpit Gate House Farmhouse, Bracewell and Brogden (1259100)", National Heritage List for England
- Historic England, "Wedacre Farmhouse, Bracewell and Brogden (1073404)", National Heritage List for England
- Historic England, "Yarlside Farmhouse and attached barn, Bracewell and Brogden (1073406)", National Heritage List for England
- Historic England, "Hopwood Farmhouse, Bracewell and Brogden (1361691)", National Heritage List for England
- Historic England, "Manor House, Bracewell and Brogden (1073408)", National Heritage List for England
- Historic England, "Jack House, Bracewell and Brogden (1273057)", National Heritage List for England
- Historic England, "New House Farmhouse, Bracewell and Brogden (1273085)", National Heritage List for England
- Historic England, "Hopwood House, Bracewell and Brogden (1243016)", National Heritage List for England
- Historic England, Listed Buildings
