= Church of St Mary le Ghyll, Barnoldswick =

Coordinates: 53.9282°N 2.1644°W

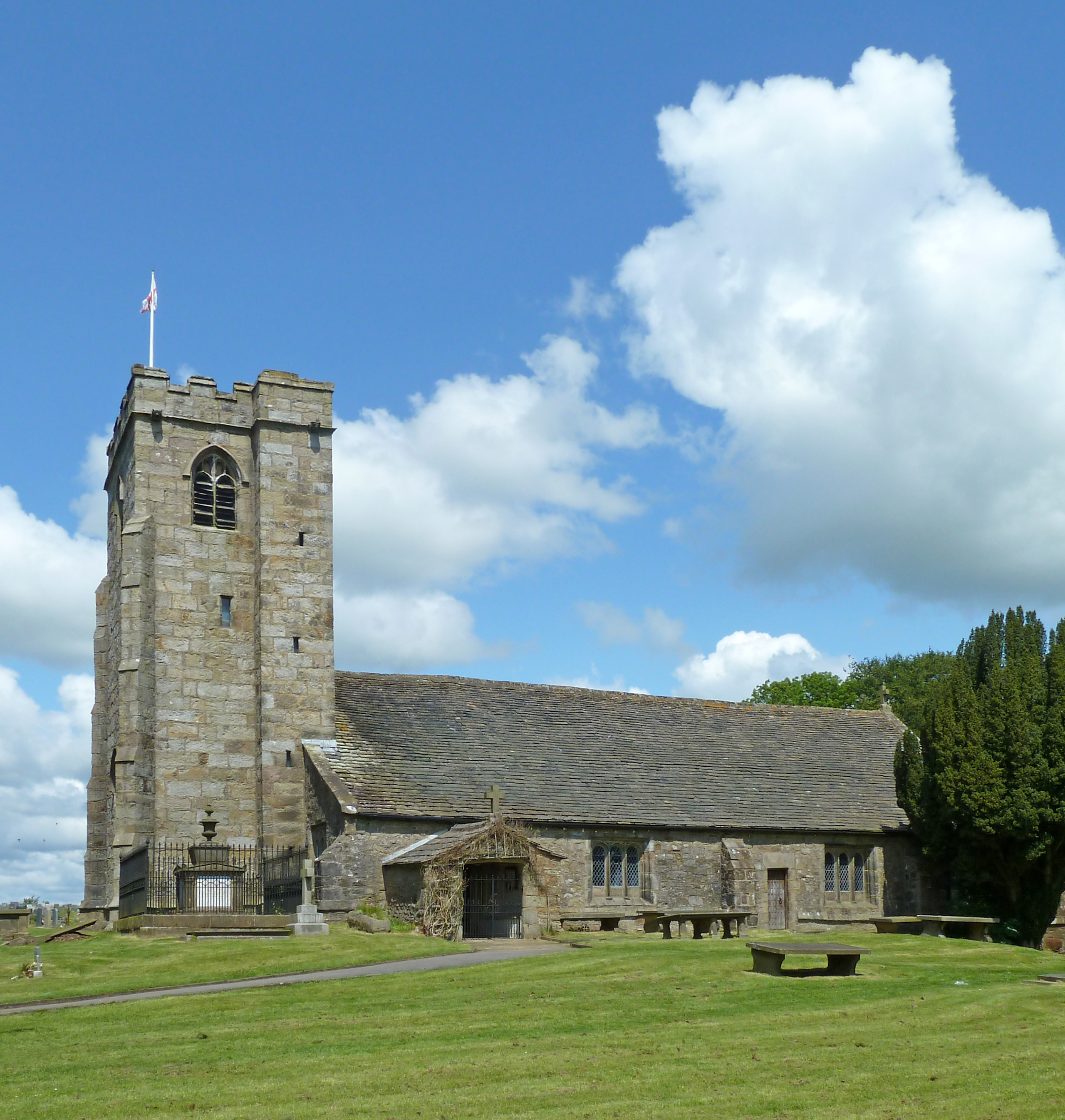
- Church of St Mary le Ghyll, Barnoldswick, from the south

- Location in the Borough of Pendle
- OS grid reference: SD 893 480
- Location: Ghyll Lane, Barnoldswick, Lancashire
- Country: England
- Denomination: Anglican
- Churchmanship: Central
- Website: St Mary le Ghyll, Barnoldswick

History
- Status: Parish church

Architecture
- Functional status: Active
- Heritage designation: Grade I
- Designated: 29 January 1988
- Architectural type: Church
- Style: Gothic
- Groundbreaking: c. 1160

Specifications
- Materials: Stone, stone slate roof

Administration
- Province: York
- Diocese: Leeds
- Archdeaconry: Craven
- Deanery: Skipton
- Parish: Barnoldswick

Clergy
- Vicar: Revd J. R. Lancaster

The Church of St Mary le Ghyll (also known as St Mary-le-Gill) is in Ghyll Lane, Barnoldswick, Lancashire, England. It is an active Anglican parish church in the deanery of Skipton, the archdeaconry of Craven, and the Diocese of Leeds. Its benefice is united with those of Holy Trinity, Barnoldswick, and St Michael, Bracewell. The church is recorded in the National Heritage List for England as a designated Grade I listed building.

== History ==
The present church was built to replace an older church on the site in about 1160 by monks from Fountains Abbey. The tower was added in 1524.

== Architecture ==
=== Exterior ===
St Mary's is constructed in stone with a stone slate roof. The plan consists of a continuous nave and chancel, a south aisle with a porch, and a west tower. The tower has diagonal buttresses, and a stair turret at the southeast corner. It contains a string course with gargoyles, and has a three-light west window, two-light louvred bell openings, and an embattled parapet. On the south side of the church are three windows and a priest's door. On the north side are four windows, one of which is a lancet. The window at the west end of the aisle has three lights, and the east window consists of three stepped lancets.

=== Interior ===
Inside the church is a five-bay arcade carried in octagonal piers. There is a complete set of box pews, and a simple bowl font, On the north wall of the nave is a complete 17th-century three-decker pulpit. Also in the church are painted boards with the Lord's Prayer, the Ten Commandments, and Creeds, and a churchwardens' pew dated 1836. There is a ring of six bells, three of which were cast in 1723 by Abraham Rudhall I. Another bell, by John Taylor and Company, was added in 1870; the remaining two date from 2007 and 2009, and were also cast by Taylor's.

== External features ==
A building in the churchyard dated 1824 was either a watch house or a bier house. It is a stone structure with a stone slate roof, and is listed at Grade II. The churchyard also contains the war graves of four soldiers and a Royal Navy sailor of World War I, and four soldiers and two Royal Navy personnel of World War II.

== See also ==
- Grade I listed churches in Lancashire
- Listed buildings in Barnoldswick
