= St Michael's Church, Bracewell =

Coordinates: 53.9320°N 2.2101°W

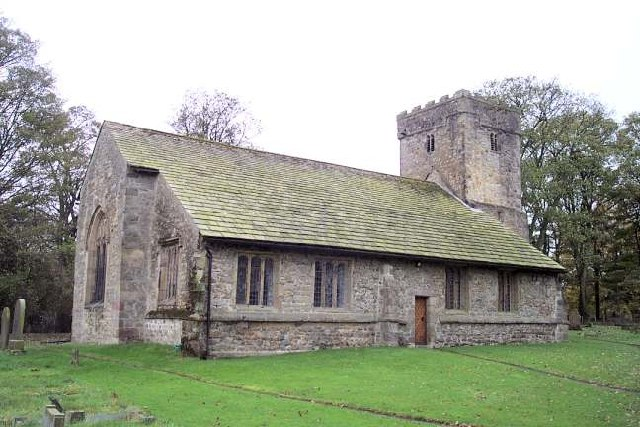
- St Michael's Church, Bracewell, from the northeast

- Location in the Borough of Pendle
- OS grid reference: SD 863 485
- Location: Bracewell Lane, Bracewell, Lancashire
- Country: England
- Denomination: Anglican
- Website: St Michael, Bracewell

History
- Status: Parish church

Architecture
- Functional status: Active
- Heritage designation: Grade I
- Designated: 29 Jan 1988
- Architectural type: Church
- Style: Norman, Gothic
- Groundbreaking: 1143

Specifications
- Materials: Stone, stone slate roof

Administration
- Province: York
- Diocese: Leeds
- Archdeaconry: Craven
- Deanery: Skipton
- Parish: Bracewell

Clergy
- Vicar: J. R. Lancaster

St Michael's Church is in Bracewell Lane, Bracewell, Lancashire, England. It is an active Anglican parish church in the deanery of Skipton, the archdeaconry of Craven, and the Diocese of Leeds. Its benefice is united with those of Holy Trinity, Barnoldswick, and St Mary le Ghyll, Barnoldswick. The church is recorded in the National Heritage List for England as a designated Grade I listed building.

== History ==
St Michael's was built in 1143 as a chantry chapel for the Tempest family, and became a parish church in 1153. Fabric from this period remains, but most of the church dates from the 15th or early 16th century. The base of the tower has been converted into a remembrance chapel.

== Architecture ==
The church is constructed in stone, with stone slate roofs. Its plan consists of a nave and chancel under a single roof, a north aisle, a south porch, and a west tower. The tower is in two stages, with a two-light west window in the lower stage and two-light bell openings in the upper stage. The parapet is corbelled and embattled. The round-headed south doorway is Norman in style. Also on the south side of the church are two two-light straight-headed windows. On the north side are four windows containing three arched lights under straight heads. The chancel also has a three-light east window.

Inside the church is a two-bay arcade carried in octagonal piers. The chancel arch is Norman, with scalloped capitals. The font is also Norman, and the pulpit and altar rails are Jacobean. The pews are more modern, and were made by Robert Thompson. Some of the windows contain 14th-century stained glass.

== See also ==
- Grade I listed buildings in Lancashire
- Grade I listed churches in Lancashire
- Listed buildings in Bracewell and Brogden
