= Esse stoves =

Brand of heating appliances

ESSE Ltd
- Headquarters: Barnoldswick, Lancashire United Kingdom
- Products: Cooking and heating equipment
- Number of employees: 100
- Website: https://www.esse.com/

ESSE is a United Kingdom brand of heating appliances, notable for having been, in the early 19th century, the first to bring the North American type of enclosed heating stoves to Europe.

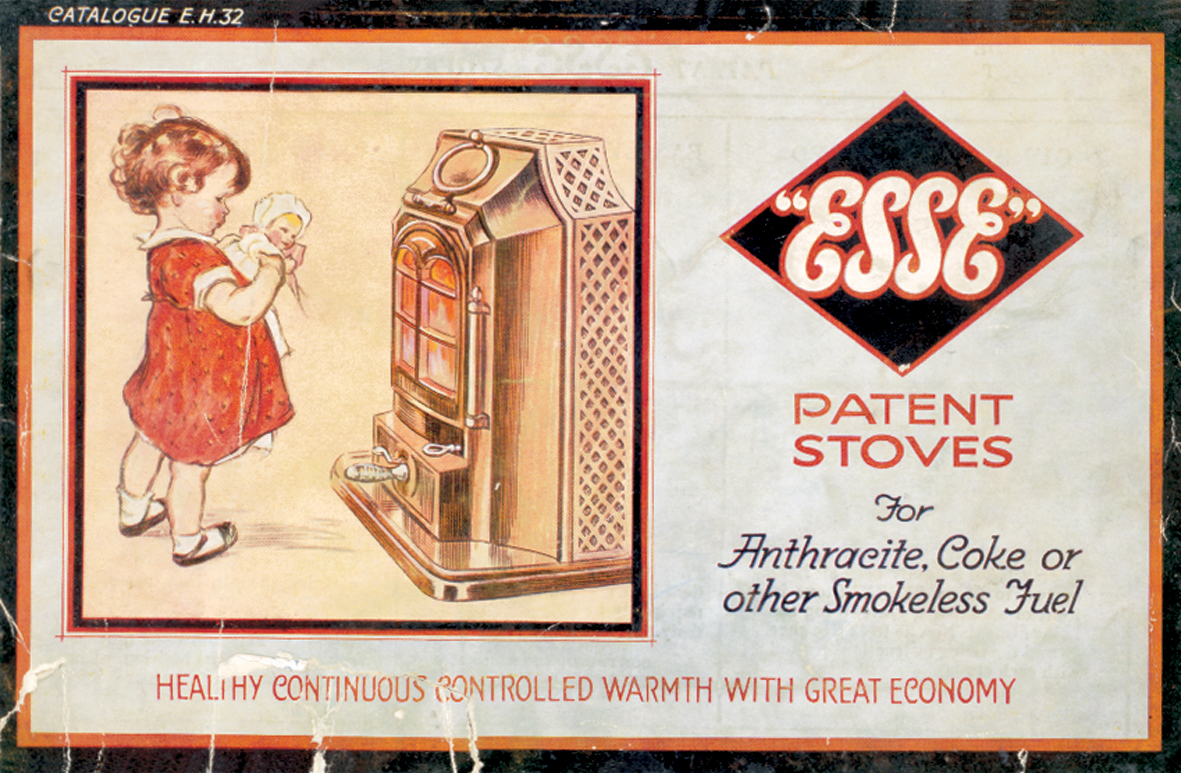
1920s Esse Convector Stove Advertisement

== History ==
In the 1830s, as a teenager, James Smith left Scotland for the United States and established a business selling the new American type of enclosed cooking ranges and stoves in Jackson, Mississippi.

Realizing these products offered advantages in efficiency and cleanliness over the open fires commonly used in Europe, he returned to his native land, and arranged for the manufacture of his own versions, initially at the Bonnybridge foundry of George Ure.

In 1854 Ure, Smith and a third partner, Stephen Wellstood, formed 'Smith & Wellstood' as a new company and named a branch in honour of the land found by Columbus: 'The Columbian Stove Works'. The 'Esse' brand name was chosen simply because it was thought to sound French, and being derived from the Latin, to be thoroughly European.

The business prospered throughout the 19th and early 20th centuries, so that the company were able to claim that every single Royal household in Europe owned an Esse, and included Auguste Escoffier, Mrs Beeton, Florence Nightingale and Ernest Shackleton among their famous clients.

Today, Esse Range Cookers, Cook Stoves and Stoves are made in Barnoldswick, Lancashire, England.

== Bibliography ==
The History of Smith & Wellstood, by Alastair Borthwick, ASIN: B0007K0DUK
