= Bracewell and Brogden =

Civil parish in Lancashire, England

Coordinates: 53.932°N 2.212°W

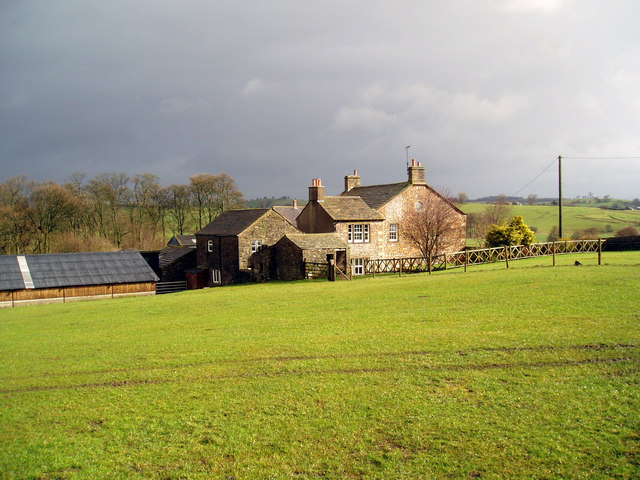
- New House

- Location in Pendle Borough Location within Lancashire
- Population: 244 (2011)
- OS grid reference: SD860484
- Civil parish: Barnoldswick
- District: Pendle
- Shire county: Lancashire
- Region: North West
- Country: England
- Sovereign state: United Kingdom
- Post town: SKIPTON
- Postcode district: BD23
- Post town: BARNOLDSWICK
- Postcode district: BB18
- Dialling code: 01282
- Police: Lancashire
- Fire: Lancashire
- Ambulance: North West
- UK Parliament: Pendle and Clitheroe

Bracewell and Brogden is a former civil parish, now in the parish of Barnoldswick, in the West Craven area of the Borough of Pendle in Lancashire, England. According to the 2001 census it had a population of 238, increasing slightly to 244 at the 2011 census. The parish included Bracewell (at grid reference SD863485) and Brogden (at SD858472); historically, both are in the West Riding of Yorkshire.

The parish was formed on 1 April 1987 from "Bracewell" and "Brogden" parishes. On 1 April 2023, the civil parish was abolished and its territory added to Barnoldswick civil parish.

== Toponymy ==
Bracewell: from a personal name, either Braegd or Breiđ, + 'well' = 'spring or stream': hence, 'Braegd's/Breiđ's spring or stream'

Brogden: 'The valley of the brook'.

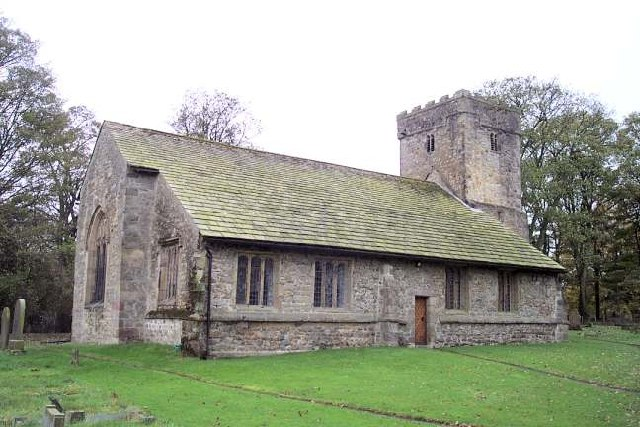
St Michael's Church, Bracewell

== History ==
The old Roman road from Ribchester to Ilkley passes through the parish, with the remains of a 4th-century Romano-British farmstead known as Bomber Camp located next to the boundary with Gisburn.

Bracewell was once a very small ancient parish in its own right. Brogden was a township in the ancient parish of Barnoldswick. It used to include the Admergill area now part of Blacko. Both were part of the Staincliffe Wapentake in the West Riding of Yorkshire. Both became civil parishes in 1866, forming part of the Skipton Rural District until 1974.

== See also ==
- Listed buildings in Bracewell and Brogden
- Scheduled monuments in Lancashire
