= Barnoldswick =

Town and civil parish in Lancashire, England

Coordinates: 53.9147°N 2.1895°W

Barnoldswick: Barlick
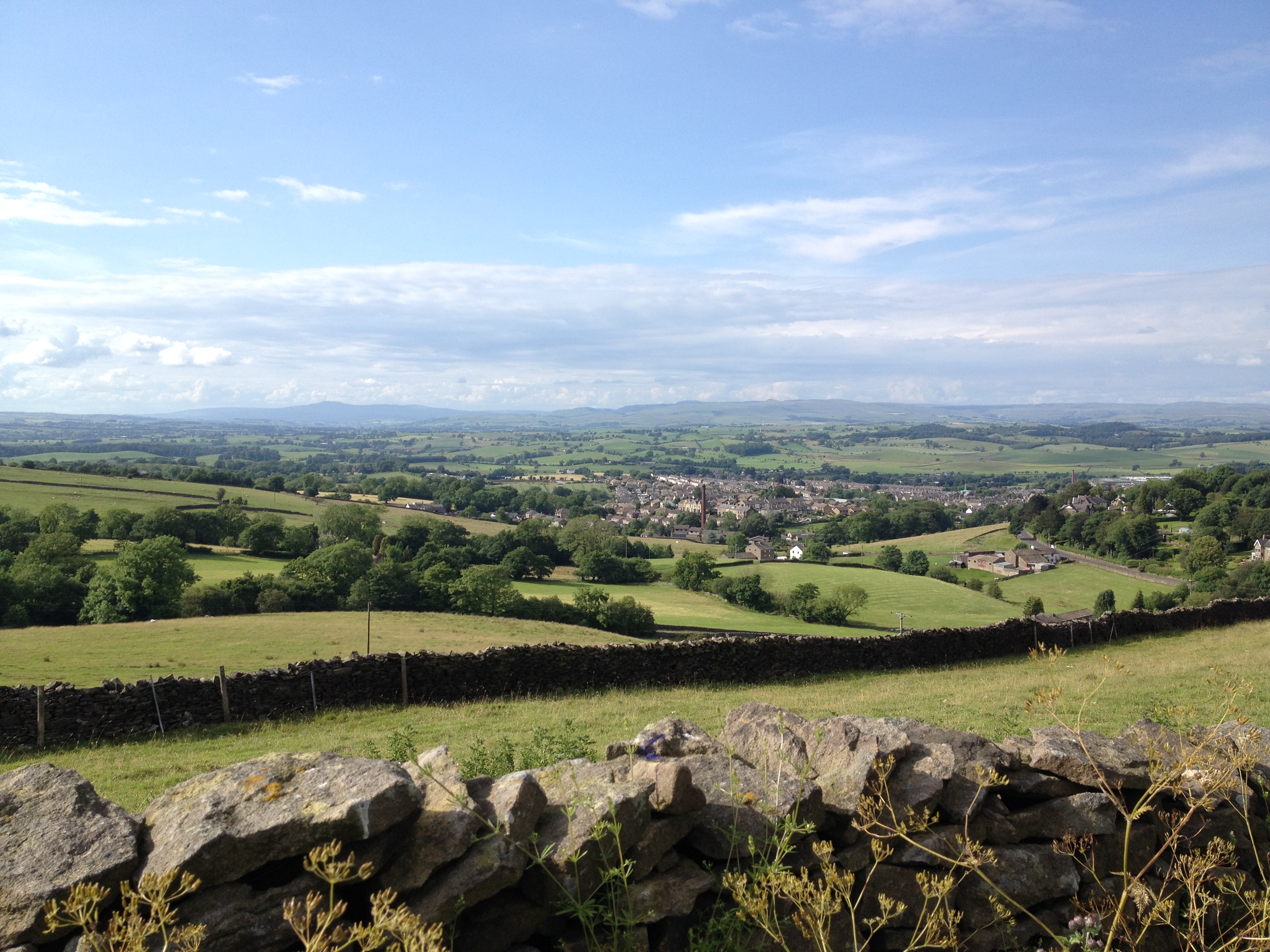
- A view from Weets Hill across Barnoldswick and Craven towards Ingleborough, Pen-y-ghent and Malham Cove in the Yorkshire Dales

- Shown within Pendle Borough Location within Lancashire
- Population: 10,752 (2011)
- OS grid reference: SD875465
- Civil parish: Barnoldswick
- District: Pendle
- Shire county: Lancashire
- Region: North West
- Country: England
- Sovereign state: United Kingdom
- Post town: BARNOLDSWICK
- Postcode district: BB18
- Dialling code: 01282
- Police: Lancashire
- Fire: Lancashire
- Ambulance: North West
- UK Parliament: Pendle and Clitheroe

Barnoldswick (pronounced /bɑːrˈnɒldzwɪk/) is a market town and civil parish in the Borough of Pendle, Lancashire, England. It lies within the boundaries of the historic West Riding of Yorkshire. It is situated 30 miles (48 km) from Leeds and 40 miles (64 km) from Lancaster; nearby towns include Skipton to the east, Clitheroe to the west, Burnley to the south and Keighley to the east-south-east. The civil parish has a population of 10,752.

== History ==
Barnoldswick dates back to Anglo Saxon times. It was listed in the Domesday Book as Bernulfesuuic, meaning "Bernulf's Town" (–uuic being an archaic spelling of –wick, meaning "settlement", in particular, a "dairy farm"). The town is known locally as Barlick.

A Cistercian monastery was founded here in 1147, by monks from Fountains Abbey. However, they left after six years, before construction was complete, driven out by crop failures and locals unhappy at their interference in the affairs of the local church. They went on to build Kirkstall Abbey. They returned after another ten years to build the isolated Church of St Mary-le-Ghyll close to the road between Barnoldswick and Thornton in Craven.

At the same time, William de Percy II, feudal baron of Topcliffe, granted Crooks House in the northern part of the Bracewell area to the monks who founded Sawley Abbey.

For hundreds of years, Barnoldswick remained a small village. However, the arrival of the Leeds and Liverpool Canal, and later the (now closed) railway, spurred the development of the existing woollen industry, and helped it to become a major cotton town. The engine of the last mill to be built in Barnoldswick, Bancroft Mill, has been preserved and is now open as a tourist attraction – a 600hp steam engine, which is still operational.

== Geography ==
On the lower slopes of Weets Hill in the Pennines, astride the natural watershed between the Ribble and Aire valleys, Barnoldswick is the highest town on the Leeds and Liverpool Canal, lying on the summit level of the canal between Barrowford Locks to the south west and Greenberfield Locks just north east of the town.

Barnoldswick lies very near the Yorkshire Dales National Park and the Forest of Bowland Area of Outstanding Natural Beauty. Stock Beck, a tributary of the River Ribble, runs through the town.

== Governance ==
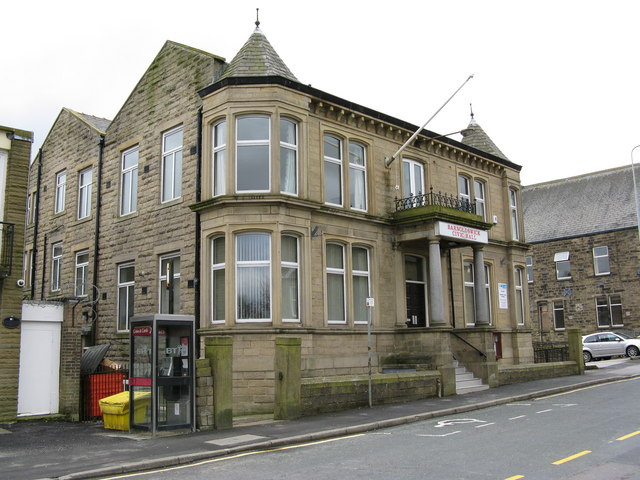
Barnoldswick Civic Hall

Barnoldswick was an ancient parish in Staincliffe Wapentake in the West Riding of Yorkshire (although Blackburnshire in Lancashire sometimes claimed the area). The parish included the townships of Brogden with Admergill, Coates and Salterforth, all of which became separate civil parishes in 1866. The civil parish of Coates rejoined the parish of Barnoldswick in 1923.

From 1894 until 1974, Barnoldswick formed an urban district within the administrative county of the West Riding of Yorkshire. Until 1974, post used to be addressed via Colne, Lancashire, to addresses in Barnoldswick.

Following the Local Government Act 1972, Barnoldswick and a number of surrounding Yorkshire villages, including Earby and Kelbrook, were transferred to the Borough of Pendle in the Non-metropolitan county of Lancashire in 1974.

On 1 April 2023, the civil parish of Bracewell and Brogden was abolished and its territory added to Barnoldswick.

At present, Barnoldswick has a town council and forms part of the West Craven Area Committee on Pendle Borough Council.

In 2014, Eliza Mowe celebrated 10 years as one of only 20 female town criers in the country.

The Member of Parliament for Pendle and Clitheroe, the constituency into which the town falls, is Jonathan Hinder (Labour), who was first elected in 2024.

== Economy ==
Since 1854, Barnoldswick has been the home of Esse stoves, one of the country's oldest standing stove manufacturers. The company have manufactured in the town since 1854 and clients have included Florence Nightingale, Shackleton and Scott, Alan Hinkes and River Cottage. Esse have their head office at the Ouzledale Factory in the town and distribute all their stoves through a close link of specialist stove retailers.

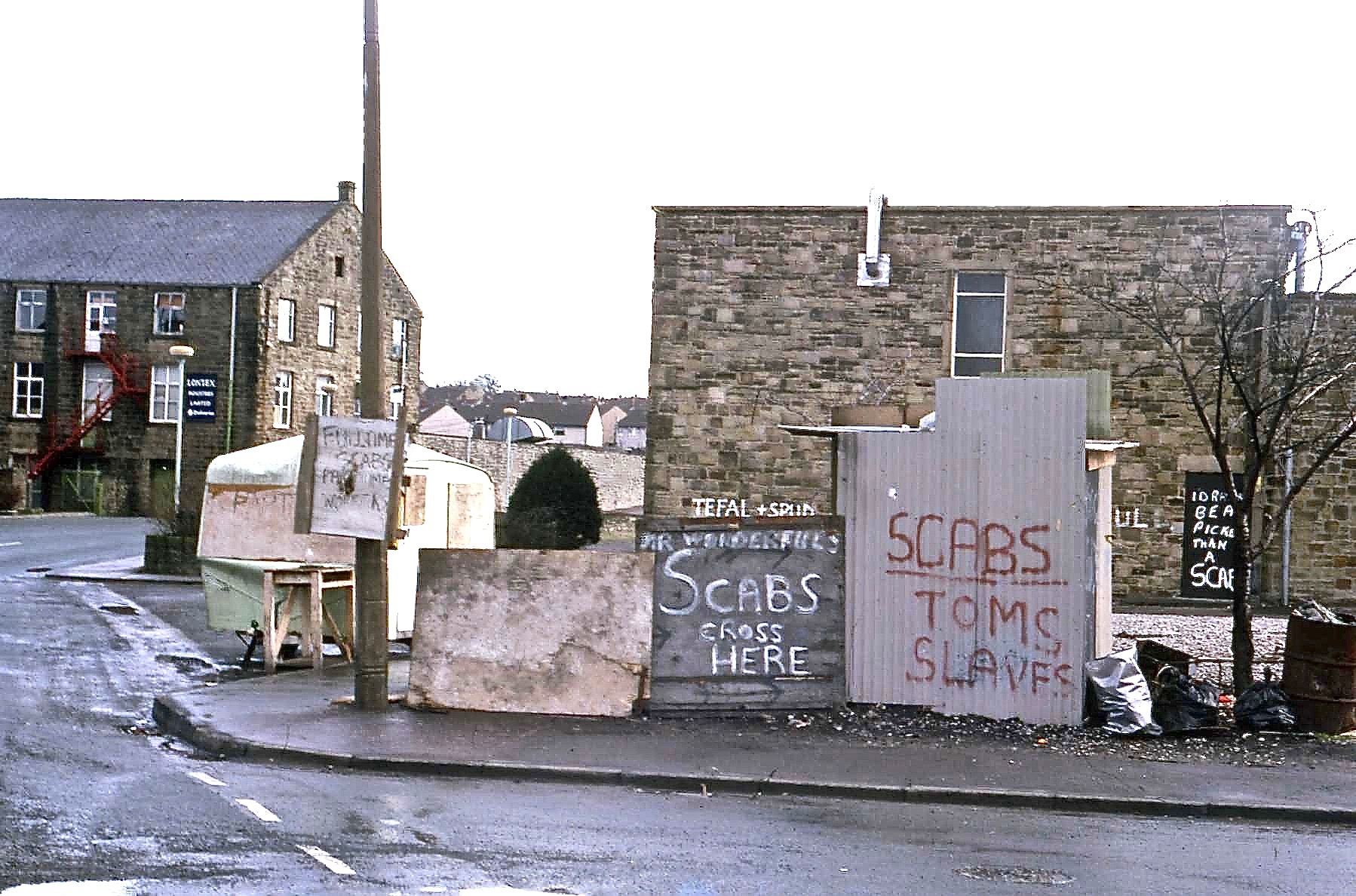
The longest strike – Silentnight picket line in June 1986

Barnoldswick is also home to Silentnight Beds, the United Kingdom's largest manufacturer of beds and mattresses. Silentnight, part of the Silentnight Group, has its head office and manufacturing premises in the town. Silentnight is noteworthy in trade union history (in this case Furniture, Timber and Allied Trades Union) as having the longest ever strike, from 1985 to 1987.

Rolls-Royce plc is a large employer based in the town. It was originally Bankfield Shed, a cotton weaving mill that Rover used to produce the production version of Whittle's gas turbine and was purchased by Rolls-Royce in 1943. The model number of many Rolls-Royce jet engines start with the initials RB (e.g. RB199) which stands for Rolls Barnoldswick, as Rolls-Royce aero's design centre was situated in Barnoldswick. The company once employed over 3,000 people in the town, a figure which has been reduced to around 350 today, and it remains the largest single employer.

Hope Technology, a manufacturer of mountain bike parts such as disc brakes, hubs, and headsets, is based in Barnoldswick. Albert Hartley Textiles is the last remaining textiles mill in the town and is a big employer for the local area. Originally, there were thirteen mills in the town, the last being constructed in 1920. There are currently plans to renovate the mill and create a local apprenticeship scheme.

Put in place by Manchester-based property developers, Capital & Centric Plc the scheme would involve construction of a new factory, and a medium-sized supermarket. The plans were approved over two other competing schemes in August 2012, the council citing that, in addition to adhering with planning policy, the site on Harley was favoured, because of the job creation for the town.

== Transport ==
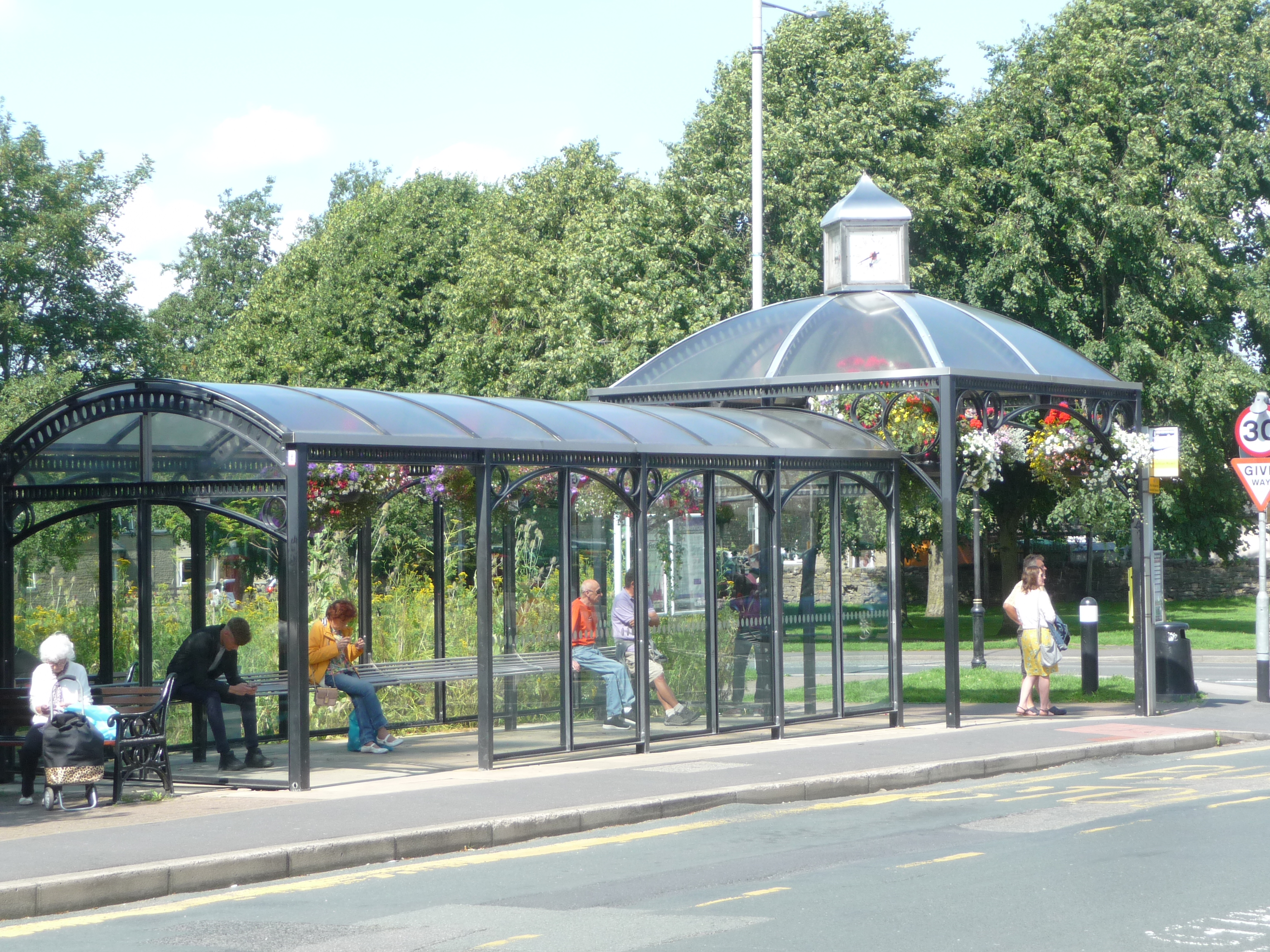
The town's central bus terminal

Barnoldswick lies on the bus routes between Skipton and Burnley and between Skipton and Clitheroe/Preston, operated by Burnley Bus Company and Stagecoach Merseyside & South Lancashire respectively. On Sundays, there is a service from Burnley to Grassington in the Yorkshire Dales National Park that passes through the town.

Barnoldswick railway station formerly served the town, on the Midland Railway's branch line off the Skipton to Colne line, though this was closed under the Beeching Axe in 1965; the pressure group SELRAP is campaigning for the reopening of the latter line. At present, would-be rail passengers must travel via Skipton for trains serving North and West Yorkshire or via Colne/Clitheroe for trains serving Lancashire; services are operated by Northern Trains.

The nearest airports are Leeds Bradford (40 minutes by road or about two hours by public transport) and Manchester (about 1¼ hours by road or about three hours by public transport).

== Education ==
Barnoldswick is served by four primary schools; Gisburn Road, Church School and Coates Lane, whilst St. Joseph's caters to the town's Catholic population. Most secondary age students attend West Craven High School, a Secondary school situated in Barnoldswick itself, though a significant minority of students attend Ss John Fisher and Thomas More Roman Catholic High School and Park High School in Colne, and the Skipton Grammar Schools, Ermysted's and Skipton Girls' High School.

== Local media ==
Barnoldswick receives BBC North West Tonight & BBC Look North on BBC One and Granada Reports & ITV News Calendar on ITV1.

Local press includes the Craven Herald & Pioneer and Barnoldswick and Earby Times, Lancashire Telegraph and the Yorkshire Post.

== Sport ==
The town's main football club, Barnoldswick Town, plays in the North West Counties League.

== Notable residents ==
- Selina Cooper (1864–1946), suffragist, first woman to represent the Independent Labour Party in 1901, lived locally from age 12
- Adam Blacklaw (1937–2010) football goalkeeper played 415 games, 318 for Burnley and 3 for Scotland, and ran a local pub The Cross Keys, died locally
- Gordon Prentice (born 1951), politician, Labour MP for Pendle, 1992–2010.
- Michael Holt (born 1977), footballer, born locally, has played 81 games

== See also ==
- Listed buildings in Barnoldswick
