= West Craven High School, Barnoldswick =

West Craven High School
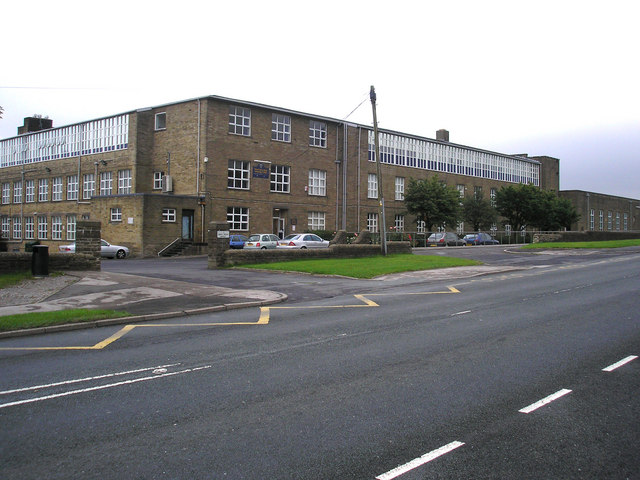
- School buildings (2006)

Location
- Kelbrook Road; Barnoldswick, Lancashire, BB18 5TB; England
- Coordinates: 53.9119°N 2.1799°W

Information
- Former name: West Craven High Technology College
- Type: Academy
- Motto: "Ad Vitam Paramus"
- Status: Open
- Local authority: Lancashire County Council
- Department for Education URN: 142856 Tables
- Ofsted: Reports
- Principal: John Bates
- Staff: 59
- Gender: Coeducational
- Age: 11 to 16
- Enrolment: 748
- Website: http://www.westcraven.co.uk

West Craven High School is a mixed 11 to 16 comprehensive school in Barnoldswick, Lancashire, England.

== School history ==
Funding to update the school's buildings had been agreed as part of the Building Schools for the Future project, but was cancelled in 2010. £6 million was later spent on the buildings.

The school became an academy in 2016, as part of the Pendle Education Trust.

== Ofsted judgements ==
As of 2025, the school's most recent Ofsted inspection was in 2024, with a judgement of requires improvement.

== Notable former pupils ==
- Glen Chapple, Lancashire and England cricketer
- John Rawnsley – opera singer and actor
