= List of tributaries of the River Ribble =

This is a list of tributaries of the River Ribble in north-west England.

== Estuary to Preston ==
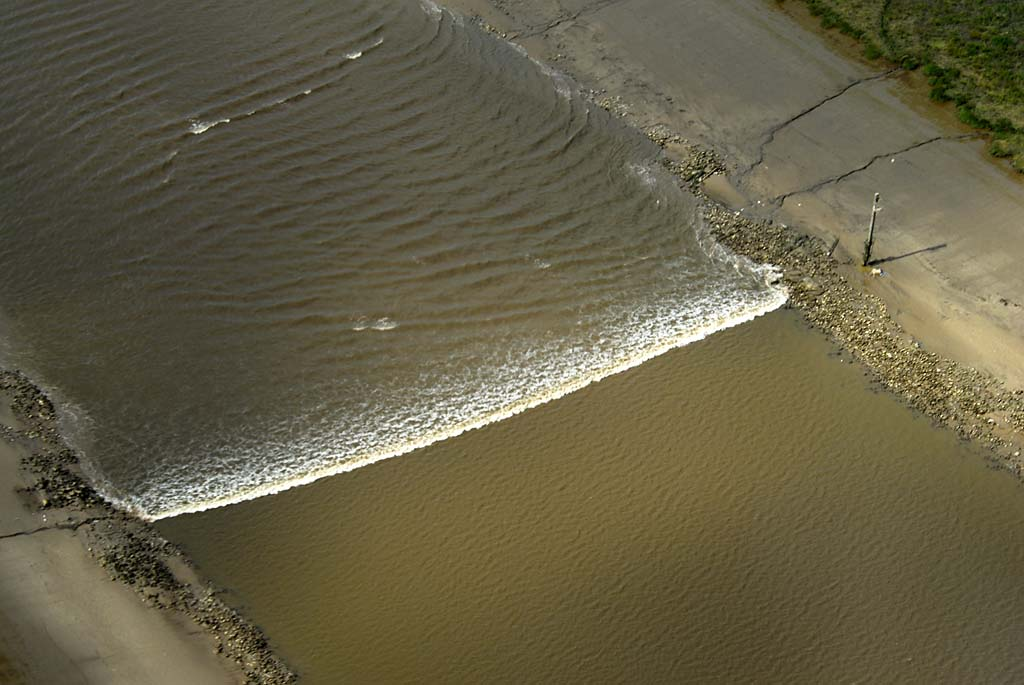
Tidal bore on the Ribble.

=== Estuary to Douglas ===
- Crossens Pool
  - The Sluice
    - Middle Drain
    - Back Drain
    - Ring Ditch
    - Boundary Drain
    - Tarleton Runner
      - Mere Brow
        - School Drain
      - Pale Ditch
    - Mere Brow Watercourse
    - Midge Hall Drain
    - Boat House Sluice
      - Langley's Brook
    - Rufford Boundary Sluice
  - Three Pools Waterway
    - Fine Jane's Brook
      - Holly Brook
      - Sandy Brook
      - Old Canal
    - Boundary Brook
      - New Cut Brook
    - Sandy Brook
      - The Old Pool
      - Black Brook
      - Drummersdale Drain
        - Brook Cut and Mill Stream
      - Bullen's Brook
      - Eas Brook
        - Hurlston Brook
- Main Drain
  - Liggard Brook
  - Wrea Brook
- Hundred End Gutter
- Pool Stream

=== River Douglas watershed ===
- River Douglas or River Asland
  - Longton Brook
  - Centre Drain
  - Carr Heys Watercourse
  - Tarra Carr Gutter
    - Hall Pool
  - Dunkirk Dib
  - Rakes Brook
  - Carr Brook
  - Strine Brook
  - River Yarrow
    - River Lostock
      - Wymott Brook
      - Clayton Brook
      - Slack Brook
      - Whave's Brook
    - Spent Brook
    - Syd Brook
      - Howe Brook
      - Pye Brook
    - Culbeck Brook
      - Chapel Brook
        - Ransnap Brook
        - German Brook
    - Hodge Brook
    - River Chor
    - Clancutt Brook
      - Tanyard Brook
      - Whittle Brook
    - Eller Brook
      - Moss Ditch
    - Black Brook
      - Tan House Brook
      - Warth Brook
        - Brinscall Brook
        - Fill Brook
    - Roaring Lum
    - Dean Brook
      - Hall Brook
      - Cote Slack
    - Limestone Brook
    - Green Withins Brook
  - The Sluice
    - Mill
    - Old Reed Brook
  - Main Ditch
  - Eller Brook
    - Wham Ditch
    - Black Brook
    - Abbey Brook
      - New Park Brook
      - Castle Brook
      - Sefton Brook
        - Dungeon Brook
        - Dicket's Brook
          - Goose Brook
  - Mill Ditch
    - New Reed Brook
    - Bentley Brook
  - River Tawd
    - Slate Brook
    - Grimshaw Brook
  - Middlehurst Brook
  - Dock Brook
  - Alder Lane Brook
  - Sprodley Brook
  - Calico Brook
  - Lees Brook
  - Dean Brook
    - Sand Brook
  - Ackhurst Brook
  - Mill Brook
  - Bradshaw Brook
  - Close Brook
  - Barley Brook
  - Smithy Brook
    - Poolstock Brook
      - Ince Brook
        - Hawkley Brook
        - Reed Brook
          - Park Brook
  - Clarington Brook
  - Bradley Brook
  - Bucklow Brook
    - Moss Ditch
    - Buckow Brook
      - Hic-bibi Brook
        - Stars Brook
          - Almond Brook
          - Tunley Brook
  - Pearl Brook
  - Arley Brook

=== Douglas to Preston ===
- Freckleton Pool
  - Dow Brook
    - Spen Brook
    - Carr Brook
      - Wrongway Brook
  - Middle Pool
- Ribble Link / Savick Brook
  - Deepdale Brook
  - Lady Head Runnel
  - Sharoe Brook
    - Moss Leach Brook
  - Eaves Brook
- Mill Brook
- The Mains Brook

== River Darwen watershed ==
- River Darwen
  - Hennel Brook
    - Cockshott Brook
  - Many Brooks
    - Black Brook
      - Hatchwood Brook
    - Fowler Brook
      - Drum Head Brook
        - Gorton Brook
        - Mill Brook
      - Bank Head Brook
  - Old Darwen
  - Beeston Brook
    - Quaker Brook
  - Hole Brook
    - Huntley Brook (North)
    - Huntley Brook (South)
  - Alum House Brook
    - Arley Brook
  - Trout Brook
  - River Roddlesworth
    - Finnington Brook
    - Stockclough Brook
      - Whitehalgh Brook
        - Shaw Brook
        - Chapels Brook
        - Sheep Bridge Brook
    - Rake Brook
    - Calf Hey Brook
    - Ferny Bed Springs
  - River Blakewater
    - Snig Brook
    - Audley Brook
    - Little Harwood Brook
      - Royshaw Clough
      - Seven Acre Brook
    - Knuzden Brook
  - Scotshaw Brook
    - Moss Brook
    - Badger Brook
  - Higher Croft Brook
    - Newfield Brook
  - Davy Field Brook
    - Flash Brook
    - Grimshaw Brook
      - Waterside Brook
        - Mean Brook
          - Sapling Clough
        - Hoddlesden Moss Brook
          - Far Scotland Brook
        - Pickup Bank Brook
          - Moss Brook
          - Twitchells Brook
  - Sunnyhurst Brook
    - Stepback Brook
  - Bold Venture Brook
    - High Lumb Brook
      - Livesey Brook
  - Kebbs Brook
    - Green Lowe Brook
  - Bury Fold Brook
    - Old Briggs Brook
      - Duckshaw Brook
  - Grain Brook
    - Bent Hall Brook
    - Deadman's Clough

== Preston to Whalley ==
- Swill Brook
- Bezza Brook
  - Wilcock Brook
    - Mellor Brook
- Tun Brook
- Stydd Brook
  - Boyce's Brook
    - Cowley Brook
    - Page Brook
  - Duddel Brook
- Starling Brook
- Dean Brook
  - Bailey Brook
  - Brownslow Brook
- Dinckley Brook
  - Park Brook
    - Showley Brook
      - Knotts Brook
    - Tottering Brook
    - Zechariah Brook

== River Calder watershed ==
- River Calder
  - Bushburn Brook
  - Dean Brook
  - Egg Syke Brook
  - Rodger Hey Brook
  - Sabden Brook
    - Badger Well Water
    - Wood House Brook
    - Cock Clough
  - Clough Syke Brook
  - Hyndburn Brook
    - Harwood Brook
      - Causeway Brook
    - Norden Brook
    - Spaw Brook
    - Shaw Brook
    - Bottom Syke
    - River Hyndburn
      - Church Brook
        - Accrington Brook
          - Woodnook Water
            - Warmden Brook
            - Tom Dale Clough
    - White Ash Brook
      - Wolfenden Syke
      - Lottice Brook
    - Tinker Brook
      - Whams Brook
      - Jackhouse Brook
        - Cocker Brook
          - White Syke
        - Cocker Lumb
  - Syke Side Brook
    - Clough Brook
  - Simonstone Brook
  - Shorten Brook
  - Dean Brook
    - Huntroyde Brook
  - Castle Clough Brook
    - Castle Clough
  - Green Brook
    - Shaw Brook
    - Sweet Clough
    - Hapton Clough
      - Thorny Bank Clough
      - Tower Brook
    - Habergham Clough
      - New Barn Clough
        - Helm Clough
      - Micklehurst Clough
        - Long Syke
  - Whitaker Clough
    - Fir Trees Brook
      - West Close Clough
      - Acres Brook
  - Moor Isles Clough
  - Spurn Clough
  - Pendle Water
    - Old Laund Clough
    - Edge End Brook
    - Walverden Water
      - Bradley Syke
      - Clough Head Beck
        - Dobson Syke
      - Catlow Brook
        - Pighole Clough
        - Pathole Beck
        - New Laithe Clough
        - Float Bridge Beck
        - Swains Plat Clough
    - Colne Water
      - Swinden Clough
      - Wanless Water
        - Slipper Hill Clough
        - Houses Beck Moss
          - Moss Houses Beck
      - Guy Syke
      - Church Clough Brook
      - Trawden Brook
        - Beardshaw Beck
        - Round Hole Beck
        - Will Moor Clough
      - River Laneshaw
        - High Laith Beck
          - Sykes Beck
          - Shawhead Beck
        - Monkroyd Beck
        - Hullown Beck
        - Swamp Syke
        - Laneshaw Brook
          - Round Holes Beck
          - Cat Stone Clough
      - Wycoller Beck
        - Ratten Clough
        - Smithy Clough
          - Deep Clough Beck
          - Nan Hole Clough
        - Turnhole Clough
          - Butter Leach Clough
          - Saucer Hill Clough
    - Blacko Water
      - Castor Gill
      - Claude's Clough
      - Admergill Water
        - Wicken Clough
        - Greystone Clough
        - Sandyford Clough
    - White Hough Water
      - Dimpenley Clough
      - Bird Holme Clough
      - Barley Water
        - Deep Clough
        - Black Moss Water
          - Water Gate
          - Warth Beck
      - Ogden Clough
        - Boar Clough
        - White Slacks
        - Dry Clough
  - Barden Clough
  - River Brun
    - River Don
      - Walshaw Clough
      - Thursden Brook
        - Ell Clough
        - Black Clough
          - Hey Stacks Clough
          - Tom Groove
    - Swinden Water
      - Hell Clough
    - Hurstwood Brook
      - Smallshaw Clough
    - Rock Water
      - Cant Clough Beck
  - Everage Clough
    - Hole House Clough
      - Buck Clough
  - Dick Clough
  - Easden Clough
  - Black Clough
  - Green Clough
    - Copy Clough
      - Sheddon Clough

== River Hodder watershed ==
- River Hodder
  - Cow Ark Brook
    - Mill Brook
    - Hagg Clough
  - River Loud
    - Leagram Brook
      - Hill Clough
      - Burnslack Brook
    - Chipping Brook
  - Greystoneley Brook
    - Hell Clough
    - Dinkling Green Brook
  - Withins Clough
  - Red Syke
  - Fielding Clough
  - Langden Brook
    - Hareden Brook
      - Lane Foot Brook
        - Fog Hill Clough
        - Cherry Gutter
      - Crackling Syke
      - Dimples Clough
    - Losterdale Brook
      - Trough Brook
    - Mere Clough Wham
    - Bleadale Water
    - Stransdale Brook
      - Stransdale Gutter
  - Robin Clough
  - River Dunsop
    - Brennand River
      - Round Hill Water
        - Brown Syke
    - Whitendale River
      - Sandy Gutter
  - Black Brook
  - Rough Syke
  - Grey Gill
  - Heaning Brook
  - Birkett Brook
    - Crimpton Brook
  - Foulscales Brook
    - Bonstone Brook
    - Crag Beck
  - Easington Brook
    - Sough Clough
    - Rye Clough
    - Skelshaw Brook
    - Langcliff Cross Brook
      - Tinklers Brook
        - Anna Land Brook
    - Harrop Brook
    - Dean Slack Brook
  - King Syke
  - Dunnow Syke
  - Croasdale Brook
    - Eller Beck
    - Lanshaw Brook
      - Davison's Syke
      - Clough Beck
      - Dunsop Brook
    - Hill Wood Syke
    - Moor Syke
      - Round Hill Syke
    - Black Brook
      - Hind Slack
  - Barn Gill
    - Park Beck
    - Dugdale Syke
  - Phynis Beck
    - Wain Hill Syke
  - Bottoms Beck
    - Hesbert Hall Syke
    - Hindley Head Clough
    - Thorp Syke
    - Dob Dale Beck
      - Nursery Beck
        - Brock Clough Beck
      - Brown Hills Beck
        - Ash Clough Swamp
  - Hasgill Beck
    - Cowgill Syke
    - Rigg Gill Syke
  - Copter Syke
  - Hare Clough Beck
  - White Syke
  - Kearsden Holes
  - Red Syke

== Whalley to Paythorne ==
- Barrow Brook
- Pig Hill Brook
- Barrow Clough
- Pendleton Brook
  - Mearley Brook
    - Shaw Brook
    - Worston Brook
      - Rad Brook
  - Howcroft Brook
- Bashall Brook
  - Hollins Clough
  - Cow Hey Brook
    - Sandy Ford Brook
  - Braddup Clough
  - Elm Clough
- Waddington Brook
  - Coplow Brook
- Greg Sike
- West Bradford Brook
  - Brocklehurst Brook
  - Drakehouse Brook
    - Porters Brook
      - Bradford Brook
- Moor Roads Sike
- West Clough Brook
- Grindleton Brook
- Chatburn Brook
- Smithies Brook
  - Swanside Beck
    - Stankhill Beck
      - Gazegill or Rimington Beck
        - Thistleber Beck
          - Eel Beck
            - Widow Hill Beck
        - Skell Banks Syke
        - Howgill Beck
          - Whytha Beck
          - Collaver Syke
        - Crag Clough
    - Dudland Syke
      - Cow Gill Beck
  - Ings Beck
    - Twiston Beck
      - Pendle Hill Brook
    - Clough Beck
    - Gill Beck
- Rathmill Sike
- Hollins Syke
- Skinners Sike
- Sliping Brook
  - Hell Syke
  - Hill Brook
- Skirden Beck
  - Holden Beck
    - Mear Gill
      - Fell Brook
        - Bay Gate Brook
        - Far Fields Brook
        - Black Brook
      - Holden Beck
        - Threap Green Brook
  - Kirk Beck
    - Fox Gill Beck
      - Gill Bottom Beck
  - Bier Beck
    - Hungrill Beck
      - Higher Syke
        - Bleara Syke
        - Varleys Syke
    - Cuddy Syke
  - Monubent Beck
    - Hen Gill Beck
      - Agden Beck
        - Mere Syke
  - Grunsagill Beck
    - Tosside Beck
      - Holden Beck or Moor End Beck
  - New Gill Beck
    - Bond Beck
      - Little Beck
      - Sandy Syke
    - Walkers Clough
- Fooden Gill
- Park House Beck
- Wheatley Beck
- Ellenthorpe Gill

== Paythorne to source ==
- Stock Beck
  - Spittle Syke
  - Horton Beck
  - Bottom Beck
    - Lodge Hill Syke
      - Old Park Syke
        - Wedacre Syke
        - Hesketh Rough Syke
  - Flush Beck
  - Hell Forest Dike
    - Turpit Gate Syke
    - Hayfield Dike
      - Tosber Syke
  - Fools Syke
    - Ray Gill Water
      - Ray Gill
    - Horrox Gill
  - Crownest Syke
  - Gillians Beck
    - Moor Side Beck
- East Beck
  - Carholme Beck
- Ray Gill
- Ged Beck
- Swinden Gill Beck
  - Mallardale Beck
- Mansell Beck
- Pan Beck
  - Hellifield Beck
  - Gallaber Syke
    - Bend Gate Syke
  - Kell Well Beck
- Candle Rush Beck
- Deep Dale Syke
- Long Preston Beck
  - Bookil Gill Beck
  - Scaleber Beck
- Old Field Syke
  - Crow Hill Syke
- Wigglesworth Beck
  - Tofts Syke
  - Rough Syke
- Rathmell Beck
  - Hollow Gill Beck
  - Rathmell Goit
- Skir Beck
- Mear Beck
- Swaw Beck
  - Carr Beck
- Tems Beck
  - Huntworth Beck
- Lodge Gill
- Stainforth Beck
  - Catrigg Beck
    - Cowside Beck
  - Tongue Gill
    - Fornah Gill
- How Beck
- Blind Beck
- Turn Dub
- Selside Beck
  - Gillgarth Beck
- Coppy Gill
- Cosh Knott Well

== Pre-Ribble ==
=== Cam Beck ===
- Cam Beck (aka Ling Gill Beck)
  - Brow Gill Beck
  - Ling Gill Beck
  - Labour Gill
  - Poverty Gill
  - Hard Turf Gill
  - Dry Gill
  - Little Bank Gill
    - Foul Gutter
  - Rush Gill
  - Lamb Fold Gill
  - Little Intake Gill
  - Middle Gill
  - Tur Gill
  - Grainings Gill
  - Red Sike
  - Pot Close Gill

=== Gayle Beck ===
- Gayle Beck
  - Axletree Gill
  - Gate Cote Gill
  - White Earth Gill
  - High Springs
  - Lat Gill
  - Long Gill
    - Mares Gill
    - Far Mares Gill
    - Shivery Gill
    - Jam Sike
  - Ouster Gill
