= Pendle Water =

River in Lancashire, England

Coordinates: 53.864°N 2.309°W

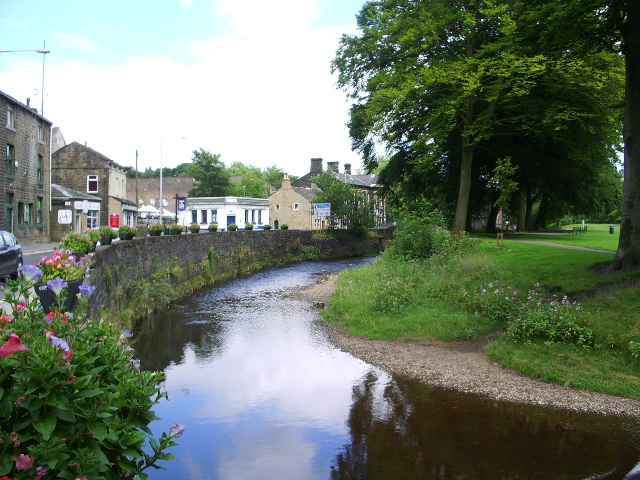
- Pendle Water in Barrowford

Location
- Country: England

Physical characteristics
- Source
  - location: Pendle Hill
- Mouth
  - location: River Calder (near Burnley)

Pendle Water is a minor river in Lancashire, England. Rising on Pendle Hill, Pendle Water cuts a deep valley between Barley Moor and Spence Hill, where it feeds into the reservoirs of Upper and Lower Ogden.

Upon exiting the lower reservoir, Pendle Water flows east through the villages of Barley and Roughlee before collecting Blacko Water, which drains the Admergill Valley at Water Meetings near Wheathead, one mile west of the village of Blacko. The river then flows south through Higherford and Barrowford, where it is joined by Colne Water. It collects Walverden Water as it passes the site of Nelson and Colne College. From this point onwards, the river flows west past the Lomeshaye Industrial Estate alongside the Leeds and Liverpool Canal towards its confluence with the River Calder in Reedley Hallows, northwest of Burnley.

Pendle Water once supplied water to the Burnley Water Treatment Works, which is situated on Wood End Lane.

== Flooding incidents ==
On Tuesday 8 August 1967, a flash flood caused devastation in the villages of Higherford and Barrowford. There was also severe flooding in 1992 and repeated deluges in 2000. Following the 2000 floods, the Environment Agency faced a £900,000 bill to stop the river washing away the embankment, which supports the M65 near the Reedyford Bridge at Barrowford.

To avoid repeats of these floods, a £5 million flood alleviation scheme in Barrowford was commissioned, and opened in June 2006 by the-then local MP Gordon Prentice. The new flood defences seek to protect up to 500 homes and 18,000m² of industrial premises.

== Lomeshaye Marsh ==
At Lomeshaye, the construction of the industrial estate and the two sewage treatment works that preceded it has seen the river's course straightened, with part of the old route still supplied with water by Edge End Brook. Since the early 1990s, the site has been regenerated into a wetland, one of only a few in the Pendle Water catchment area. Numerous local organisations, including the Lomeshaye Marsh Preservation Group, worked in conjunction with the Environment Agency to restore the site.

The site has been declared a local nature reserve and a County Biological Heritage Site in recognition of its ecological value. The local special school, Pendle Community College, was joint winner of the 2009 Ecover Ethical Kids Award for its involvement with the project.

== Main Tributaries ==
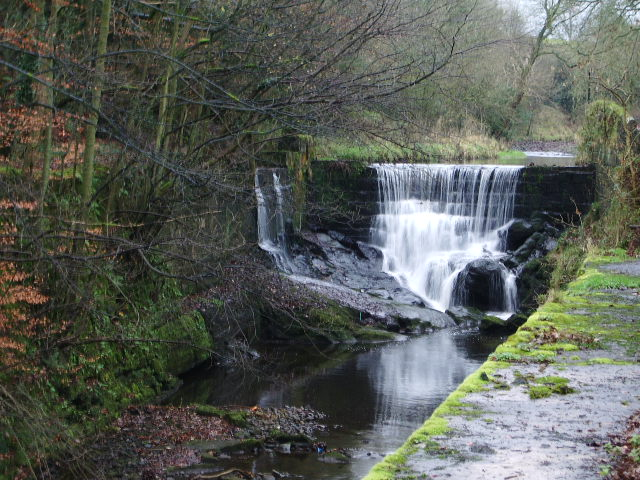
The weir at Roughlee.

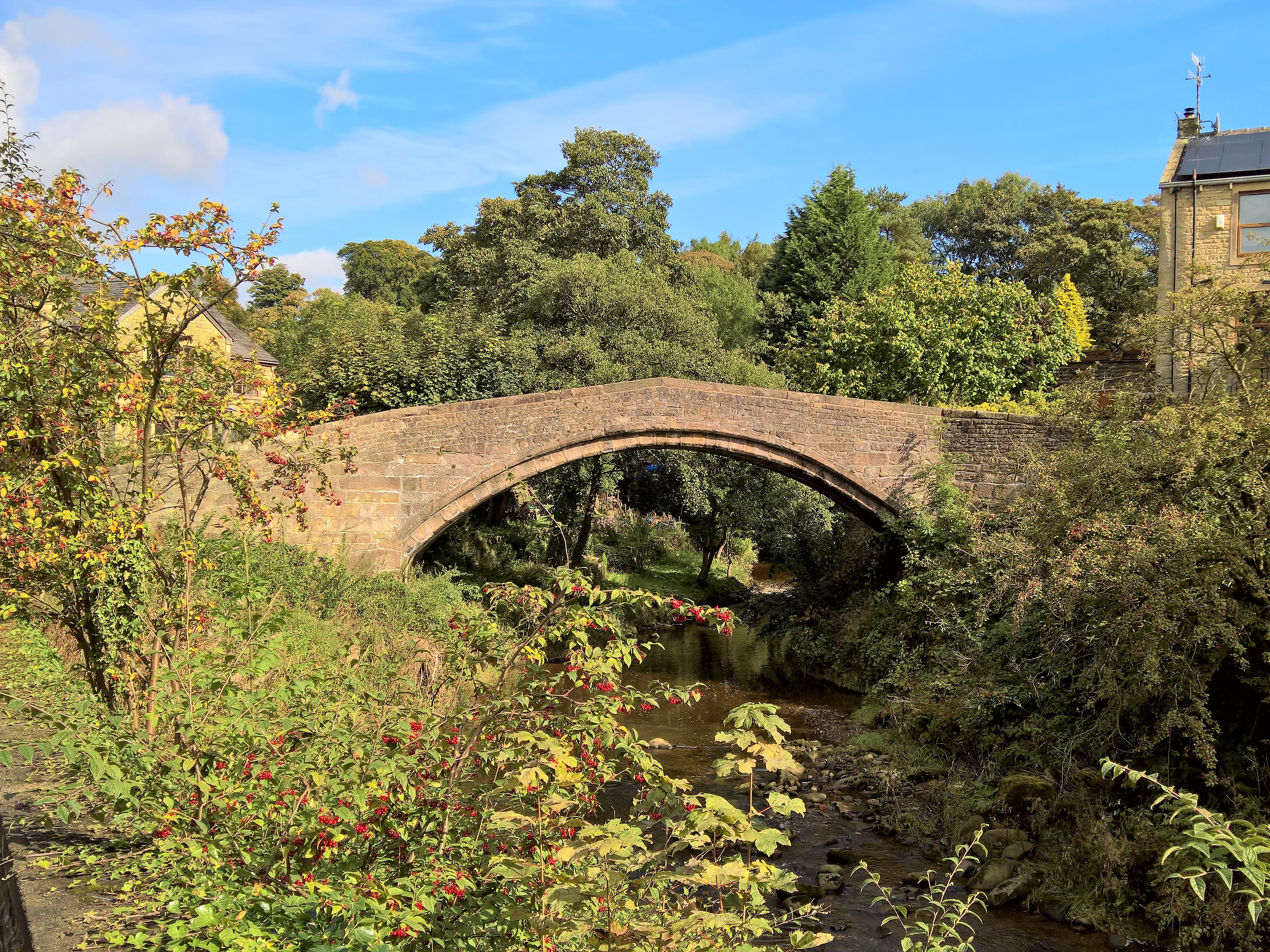
The old packhorse bridge at Higherford.

- Walverden Water
  - Catlow Brook
- Colne Water
  - Wanless Water
  - Trawden Brook
  - Wycoller Beck
  - River Laneshaw
- Blacko Water
  - Admergill Water
- White Hough Water
- Barley Water
- Ogden Clough

Next confluence upstream	River Calder	Next confluence downstream
River Brun (East)	Pendle Water	Green Brook (South)
