= Read, Lancashire =

Village in Lancashire, England

Coordinates: 53.805°N 2.355°W

Read
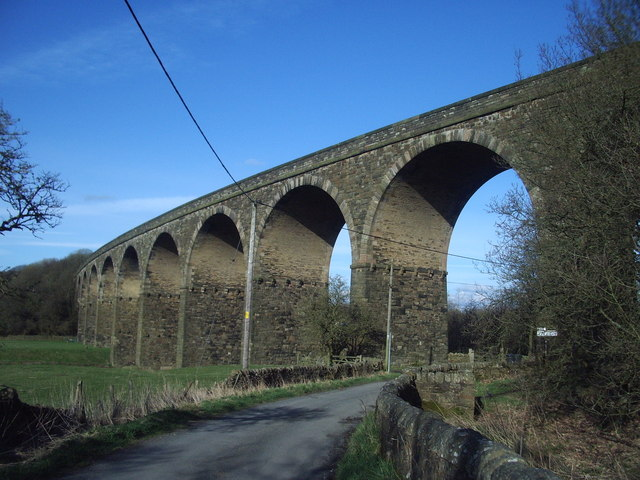
- Looking in the direction of Simonstone, the Martholme Viaduct 1 mile (1.6 km) south-west carried the defunct Great Harwood loop line of the Lancashire and Yorkshire Railway over the River Calder

- Shown within Ribble Valley Location within Lancashire
- Population: 1,419 (2011)
- OS grid reference: SD765345
- Civil parish: Read
- District: Ribble Valley
- Shire county: Lancashire
- Region: North West
- Country: England
- Sovereign state: United Kingdom
- Post town: BURNLEY
- Postcode district: BB12
- Dialling code: 01282
- Police: Lancashire
- Fire: Lancashire
- Ambulance: North West
- UK Parliament: Ribble Valley

Read /riːd/ is a village in Lancashire 5 miles west northwest of Burnley and 2 miles east of Whalley. It is on the A671 which is the main road between Burnley and Clitheroe. The population of the civil parish as taken at the 2011 census was 1,419.

== History ==
The name "Read" is a contraction of Old English words meaning female roe deer and ridge or headland.

The old village developed in the 16th century along the main mediaeval road between Whalley and Padiham.

The Battle of Read Old Bridge was fought in 1643 between the Royalist and Parliamentarian forces. The Royalist force of about 4,000 men, commanded by the Earl of Derby, had taken the village of Whalley. The Parliamentary force, numbering only about 400 men, were positioned near Read Old Bridge. As the Royalist forces approached the bridge they faced withering musket fire causing them to retreat in confusion. The Royalists gave up Whalley; about 400 largely untrained soldiers had beaten 4,000, winning Lancashire for Parliament.

== Governance ==
Read was once a township in the ancient parish of Whalley, with the River Calder forming the boundary with Altham and Sabden Brook with Whalley. This became a civil parish in 1866, forming part of the Burnley Rural District from 1894 to 1974. Parts of the parish transferred to Sabden on its creation in 1904. (Note: The old township also shared a boundary with Wiswell and Pendleton at Sabden Brook.) It has since become part of the borough of Ribble Valley.

Together with Simonstone, the parish forms the Read and Simonstone ward of Ribble Valley Borough Council. The ward had a population of 2,535 in 2001, rising to 2,573 in 2011. The ward elects two councillors, who currently are Richard Bennett and Lesley Graves, both of the Conservative Party.

== Landmarks ==
Read Hall and Park was the seat of the Nowell family from the 14th century and Roger Nowell was a magistrate at the time of the Lancashire Witches in 1612 sending them to Lancaster for trial and eventual execution.

In the 1870s Victoria Mill, together with a few houses for employees, was built alongside the turnpike road by the Kemp family and this area of Read became known as Newtown. More houses and shops were built using stone quarried in the village and Read now has a variety of small businesses catering for many needs.

The parish church is dedicated to St John the Evangelist by Henry Ross of Accrington, 1884, with the west steeple dating from 1911.

The nearby Martholme Viaduct, about 1 mile (1.6 km) south-west carried the defunct Great Harwood loop line of the Lancashire and Yorkshire Railway over the River Calder between Simonstone and Great Harwood and was built by Sturges Meek, 1870–77, and consists of ten 65 ft high arches on a gentle curve.

== See also ==
- Listed buildings in Read, Lancashire
