= River Colne =

River Colne is the name of several rivers in England

- River Colne, Essex, passing through Halstead, Colchester and Wivenhoe
- River Colne, Hertfordshire, a tributary of the River Thames, flowing from south Hertfordshire to form the border of Buckinghamshire and Greater London
- River Colne, West Yorkshire, a tributary of the River Calder passing through Huddersfield
- Colne Water, in Colne, Lancashire

== See also ==
- Colne, a town in Lancashire
- Colne Brook, one of several distributaries of the River Colne in Hertfordshire
- River Coln in Gloucestershire
