= River Hyndburn =

River in Lancashire, England

Coordinates: 53.736°N 2.324°W

Hyndburn
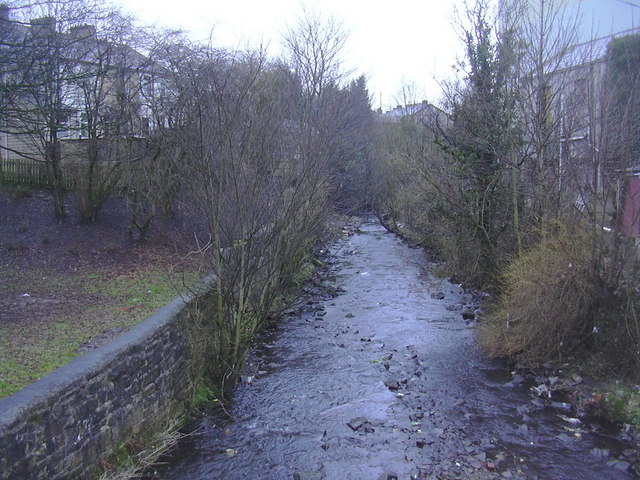
- River Hyndburn at Church Bridge.

Location
- Country: England

Physical characteristics
- Source
  - location: Goodshaw Hill, Rossendale (as Woodnook Water)
- Mouth
  - location: Hyndburn Brook, south of Dunkenhalgh.

The River Hyndburn is a minor river in Lancashire, England. Beginning as Woodnook Water on the slopes of Goodshaw Hill, it passes through Stone Fold, Rising Bridge and Baxenden where it is augmented by streams from Thirteen Stone Hill and continues to the Woodnook area of Accrington. Near St James Church, it collects Broad Oak Water (recorded in 1800 as the River Grange), becoming the River Hyndburn. It heads northward through the town centre, collecting Pleck Brook and turning west, flowing under the East Lancashire railway line viaduct and continuing to Church.

Here it turns northward again, meeting Hyndburn Brook just before it passes under the M65 motorway bridge to the south of Dunkenhalgh, which continues past Clayton-le-Moors and Great Harwood, ultimately joining the River Calder. Today, much of the course of the river and parts of its tributaries run underground through culverts. The Hyndburn borough of Lancashire is named after the river.

== Meaning of the river name ==
The name is from Old English burna "stream" (not Old Norse brunnr 'spring', as with some place names over the boundary in North Yorkshire). The origins of Hynd are uncertain. It could be derived from the Old English hyldre "an elder-tree", or hynd "hind", or the Old Norse/Old English personal name Helþor/Helthor. An early mention of the name can be found in the "Chetham miscellanie", which contains an entry from 1360; "Bounds of Magna (Great) Harwood. Begin at the foot of Northdeyne water at the falling thereof into Hindeburne/Hyndburne water."

The name of the river may have changed over time. On William Yates map of 1786, it is seen as the Winburn. This is thought to be because the source of the river can be found in the Win Fields, still known as Winfields today. By 1828, it is written as Henburn, perhaps referring to the fact it ran along the edge of HenField to the North of Accrington. Two streams that go on to become the River Hyndburn lie within the old township of Henheads. The township is thought to be so named because the Hyndburn was more often called the Henburn in the past. On the 1848 Six-inch Ordnance Survey map, it is written as Hyndburn brook.

== Tributaries ==
- Antley Syke
- Pleck Brook
- Broad Oak Water
  - Warmden Brook
    - Tag Clough
    - Laund Clough
- Woodnook Water
  - Tom Dale Clough
  - Luddington Clough

== Wildlife ==
An ongoing river improvement scheme aimed to allow migrating salmon, trout and eels access to the River Hyndburn, saw the construction in 2017 of a fish bypass at the 4-metre (13 ft 1 in) high, 19th-century Oakenshaw Print Works weir on Hyndburn Brook. In June 2019, work started on a similar project, upstream at the weir of Dunkenhalgh near Rishton.

On 11 July 2018, Woodnook Vale and Peel Park were officially designated as local nature reserves, becoming the two largest in Lancashire. Woodnook Vale covers approximately 2.2 miles (3.5 km) of Woodnook Water, south of Accrington and includes Rothwell Heights on the western side of the valley. The Peel Park site, east of the town, covers the mill ponds above the old Plantation Mill print works site, which supply Pleck Brook.
