= Listed buildings in Read, Lancashire =

Read is a civil parish in Ribble Valley, Lancashire, England. It contains seven listed buildings that are recorded in the National Heritage List for England. Of these, one is at Grade II*, the middle grade, and the others are at Grade II, the lowest grade. The most important building in the parish is the country house Read Hall; this and a number of structures in the grounds are listed. The other listed buildings are a church, a farmhouse, and a railway viaduct.

== Key ==
Grade	Criteria
II*	Particularly important buildings of more than special interest
II	Buildings of national importance and special interest

== Buildings ==
Name and location	Photograph	Date	Notes	Grade
Houlker's Farmhouse; 53.81135°N 2.35691°W		Mid 18th century	A sandstone house with a stone-slate roof in two storeys. The windows have plain surrounds, and the doorway has an architrave with a stepped keystone.	II
Read Hall; 53.80900°N 2.36998°W		1818–25	A country house by George Webster, it is in sandstone with hipped slate roofs, and has two storeys with an attic. It has a symmetrical south front of nine bays flanked by giant pilasters. The central three bays project forward as a bow with a domed roof, and have a colonnade of six unfluted Ionic columns carrying a semicircular balcony with iron railings. The west front has three bays. and contains a single-storey portico with two pairs of Ionic columns. On the east side is a block of three bays, behind which is a three-bay wing. Inside the house is detailed plasterwork.	II*
Lodge; 53.80514°N 2.37759°W		1820s (probable)	The lodge is at the main entrance to Read Hall. Designed by George Webster, it is in sandstone with a hipped slate roof. It is in one storey, and has a symmetrical main front. The centre is gabled and contains a portico with pairs of Greek Doric columns, flanked by pilasters with sunk panels. On each side of the centre is one bay containing round-headed windows. In the gable is a carved shield.	II
Gate piers 53.80511°N 2.37747°W		19th century	There are two pairs of gate piers of similar size. Two flank the entrance of the drive to Read Hall and, outside these, the other pair flank the pedestrian entrance. They are in sandstone, rusticated, and decorated. Each pier has a cornice and a flat cap. The gates are in iron.	II
Ice House; 53.81035°N 2.36844°W		19th century	The ice house is in the grounds of Read Hall. It is in brick and has a circular plan, tapering towards the bottom, and has a domed top covered by earth. On the south side are sandstone retaining walls, and on the north side is a square entrance.	II
Martholme Viaduct; 53.80054°N 2.37866°W		1870–77	The viaduct was built to carry the Great Harwood arm of the Lancashire and Yorkshire Railway over the valley of the River Calder. It is in sandstone and consists of ten rounded arches, with a span of 40 feet (12 m) at a height of 65 feet (20 m). The viaduct is in a slightly curved line, and the arches have an impost band and a solid parapet.	II
St John's Church; 53.80864°N 2.35709°W		1884	The church was designed by Henry Ross, and the steeple was added in 1911. It is in sandstone with a slate roof, and consists of a nave, a chancel with an apsidal east end, a north organ chamber and vestry, a south gabled projection, a timber-framed south porch, and a west steeple with a chapel to the north. The steeple has angle buttresses that rise to gablets with finials, and on the south side is a polygonal stair turret.	II
