= Clayton-le-Moors =

Town in Lancashire, England

Coordinates: 53.775°N 2.384°W

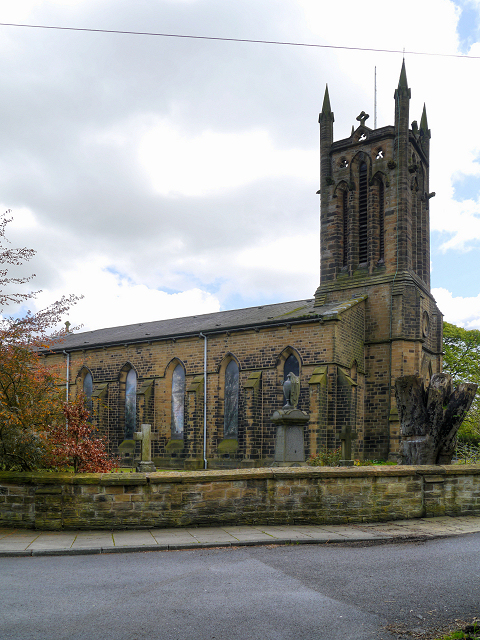
- All Saints', the parish church

- Shown within Hyndburn Location within Lancashire
- Area: 0.78 sq mi (2.0 km^{2})
- Population: 8,522 (2011)
  - Density: 10,926/sq mi (4,219/km^{2})
- OS grid reference: SD745315
- District: Hyndburn
- Shire county: Lancashire
- Region: North West
- Country: England
- Sovereign state: United Kingdom
- Post town: ACCRINGTON
- Postcode district: BB5
- Dialling code: 01254
- Police: Lancashire
- Fire: Lancashire
- Ambulance: North West
- UK Parliament: Hyndburn

Clayton-le-Moors is an industrial town in the Borough of Hyndburn in the county of Lancashire, England. located two miles north of Accrington. The town has a population of 8,522 according to the 2011 census.

To the west lies Rishton, to the north Great Harwood, and two miles to the south, Accrington. Clayton-le-Moors is situated on the A680 road alongside the M65 motorway.

== History ==
It is thought that the town developed with the fusion of the two hamlets of Oakenshaw (bottom end) and Enfield (top end) which began during the construction of the Leeds Liverpool Canal, which pre-dated the railways. The merger continued with the development of the cotton textile industry, particularly that of weaving and cloth finishing. The stretch of canal between Burnley and Enfield Wharf (now alongside the Enfield Bridge on Blackburn Road) was opened in 1801. By 1808 it had been extended to the village of Church. The final link up between Leeds and Liverpool was completed 1816. Clayton-le-Moors now lies at the midpoint of the Leeds Liverpool Canal although there is no marker. The canal continued to be used for the commercial transportation of coal between Bank Hall Colliery, Burnley and the now demolished power generating station at Whitebirk, Blackburn, until 1963. During the harsh winter of 1963 the thickness of the ice on the canal prevented the movement of barges and coal had to be transported by road. Canal transportation was never resumed. The canal is now used solely for leisure boating and is managed and maintained by the Canal and River Trust, a charitable trust.

The Roman Catholic St. Mary's Church which opened in 1819, was originally sited on Burnley Road, east of the town, on the boundary with Altham, as a replacement for the chapel at Dunkenhalgh. The present-day St. Mary's in Clayton-le-Moors was built in 1959 and the old one demolished, with only the graveyard surviving. The Church of England, All Saints' Church was erected in 1840.

The town's two main thoroughfares are the A680 Whalley Road, which still has some canal workers' cottages, and A678 which is named Blackburn Road to the west of the junction with Whalley Road and Burnley Road to the east.

Mercer Park, once the grounds of Mercer House, is freely open to the public, and contains an updated war memorial. The house was previously Oakenshaw Cottage, where John Mercer lived towards the end of his life. Mercer, a self-taught chemist born in Great Harwood, invented the mercerisation process for treating cotton which is still in use today. He was also a pioneer of colour photography.

Clayton-le-Moors is said to be a town of two halves. Residents were either 'top-enders' or 'bottom-enders', depending on which side of the Whalley Road canal bridge they lived. The two communities had firm opinions about each other and were said to rarely mix. With the mixing of the town's children at common schools, this is no longer the case but the distinction between top and bottom enders still remains. There was, however, an annual football match between them at the running track at Wilson's Playing Fields (formerly the Woodlands Playing Fields), which lie behind woodland close to Sparth House in lower Whalley Road. The synthetic running track there is surrounded by football pitches, a cricket pitch and changing rooms. It also hosts Hyndburn parkrun, a timed 5 km run every Saturday morning.

== Governance ==
Clayton-le-Moors was once a township in the ancient parish of Whalley, with Dunkenhalgh in the south-west and Hyndburn Brook forming the boundary with Rishton and Great Harwood as far as the River Calder. This became a civil parish in 1866. Between 1894 and 1974 the area was administered by an Urban District Council. As a consequence of the re-organisation of Local Government in 1974, Clayton became an unparished constituent of the Borough of Hyndburn, centered on Accrington.

== Demography ==
In 2001 town had a population of 8,290. There is also a ward with the same name in Hyndburn however it does not cover all of the town. The population of this ward at the 2011 census was 4,725.

== Sport ==
- Clayton Amateur Boxing Club, now based in new facilities at the old library serves the local area providing opportunities for young people to express themselves through sport, health and fitness. Head coach is John Brindle who is supported by an outstanding group of coaches.

Clayton ABC have created dozens of North West Regional Champions, national and international Box Cup Champions and National Champions and continues to grow year on year.

- Clayton Le Moors Harriers founded in 1922, is one of the largest athletic clubs in the North of England, catering for cross-country, fell and road running.
- Kuon Ji Ju Jitsu Association is a martial arts club established in October 1982, by Sensei Tony Gregson under the guidance of Sensei Thomas Duckett it meets at the Civic Library on Pickup Street.
- Hyndburn athletics club is the biggest track and field club in the area and is a successful club winning mid-Lancs championships back to back also has many Lancashire champions, combined event champions, English school competitors and competitors for Lancashire. County Medallists such as Marnie Shirtcliffe, Robert Schofield, Stephen Sumner
- Enfield Cricket Club is the town's cricket club and competes in the Lancashire League.
- Clayton le Moors also has a thriving junior football club Clayton Park Rangers FC. Named after the former town club which was dissolved in the early 1980s. The club currently runs 7 teams from the age of 7 to 16.

== Amenities ==
=== Schools ===
Secondary education is no longer available within the town. 11 - 18 year olds now have to travel to schools in adjoining Hyndburn townships or beyond. Three primary schools provide education for the under 11s. They are Mount Pleasant Primary School on Earl Street, All Saints Church of England Primary School on Church Street and St Marys Roman Catholic Primary School on Devonshire Drive.

== Notable people ==
- Edward Rishton (1550–1585), an English Roman Catholic priest, worked in France and was later exiled there.
- Netherwood Hughes (1900-2009), originally from Great Harwood, one of the last surviving veterans of World War I, died at the local Woodlands Home for the Elderly in 2009, aged 108.
- Nicholas Freeston (1907-1978), poet who spent most of his working life as a local weaver.
- Fred Brown (1925-2004), a virologist and molecular biologist, born locally.
- Eric Morecambe (1926-1984), comedian of Morecambe and Wise, lived in Clayton while working in a nearby coal mine as a 'Bevin Boy'.
- Jim Bowen (1937–2018), stand-up comedian and TV host of the ITV game show Bullseye
- Alex Higgins (1949-2010) lived in the town on arrival from Northern Ireland. East Lancashire had a thriving snooker scene and Higgins was keen to learn from great players in the area.
- Vicky Entwistle (born 1968), actress who played the factory worker Janice Battersby in Coronation Street, her parents ran a local newsagent shop.

=== Sport ===
- Arthur Appleby (1843–1902), first-class cricketer, played 81 First-class cricket matches
- John B. Kirkham (1869–1930), footballer who played 104 games for Accrington
- Ken Sharples (1924–1967), speedway rider, earned eight international caps for the England national speedway team
- Sir Clyde Walcott (1926-2006), West Indies test cricketer lodged locally during the English cricket season 1951/1954.
- Alan Ramsbottom (1936–2023), a racing cyclist, he rode the Tour de France twice, later moved to Great Harwood
- Jack Simmons (born 1941), Lancashire and Tasmania off-spinner, born and raised locally; played 450 First-class cricket games

== Notable businesses ==
Karrimor International, a world-renowned manufacturer of backpacks, footwear, and other outdoor pursuit equipment, was founded in Clayton-le-Moors in 1946. Prior to receivership and disposal of its UK manufacturing business and retail operations in 2004, it was considered to have a "tremendous tradition", a history that included "legendary" products, and a "very strong brand name", and past owner Industrialinvest stated in 2002 that the company had an "international reputation for outstanding [products]". A 1996 review of top British manufacturers by The Independent had also described Karrimor as "a leader in its... field" and one of Britain's great post war manufacturers, albeit one that it felt had (like other businesses) "failed to invest and expand". The brand and product lines still exist as of 2013, and are owned by the Sports Direct group.

== See also ==
- Listed buildings in Clayton-le-Moors
- Enfield Cricket Club
