= Read Hall and Park =

Listed building in Lancashire, England

Read Hall
- Location within the Borough of Ribble Valley

General information
- Location: Read, Lancashire, England
- Coordinates: 53.809°N 2.370°W
- Year built: 1818–25

Design and construction
- Architect: George Webster

Listed Building – Grade II*
- Official name: Read Hall
- Designated: 1 April 1953
- Reference no.: 1164581

Read Hall and Park is a manor house with ornamental grounds of about 450 acres (180 ha) in Whalley Road, Read, a few miles west of Padiham, Lancashire, England.

The current hall dates from the early 19th century and is a Grade II* listed building. The landscaped grounds date from around the same time and feature a waterfall, two lakes and woodland. There is also a rockery, rose garden and terrace, plus a fountain and gardens near the house of about 25 acres (10 ha). The hall and park are not open to the public.

== History ==
The original building on the site was three storeys, built round three sides of a courtyard by Roger Nowell, who acquired the estate in the 16th century after the Dissolution of Whalley Abbey. Alexander Nowell was an English theologian who was born in Read Hall in the Elizabethan age who was also in popular story the inventor of bottled beer on a fishing expedition. Izaak Walton describes the story in the Complete Angler. A later Roger Nowell (1582–1623) was Sheriff of Lancashire in 1610 and the magistrate at the time of the Lancashire Witches in 1612 who sent them to Lancaster for trial and eventual execution. The estate passed to his grandson, Roger (1605–1695), who raised an army during the Civil War at his own expense to help defend Lathom House for the Royalists. During the Civil War a skirmish in 1643, known as the Battle of Read Bridge in the vicinity of the hall, ended in a decisive victory for the Parliamentarian forces. After several more generations of Nowells the house was eventually sold on the death of Alexander Nowell in 1772. His widow returned to London with their daughter.

The current hall was built between 1818 and 1825 for Richard Fort, a wealthy partner in a Manchester Calico textile printing firm; when Richard died in 1829, the estate passed to his son John Fort, later the MP for Clitheroe. It was designed by the architect George Webster of Kendal when he was only 21. (Webster also built Underley Hall in Westmorland between 1825 and 1828 for Alexander Nowell). John Fort died in 1842 and was succeeded by his son Richard who was High Sheriff of Lancashire for 1854 and MP for Clitheroe from 1865 to 1868.

The rest of the park includes Home Farm and Lodge in Whalley Road, both by Webster at the same time. Home Farm was built as a model farm, and converted into living accommodation in the 20th century.

== Gallery ==
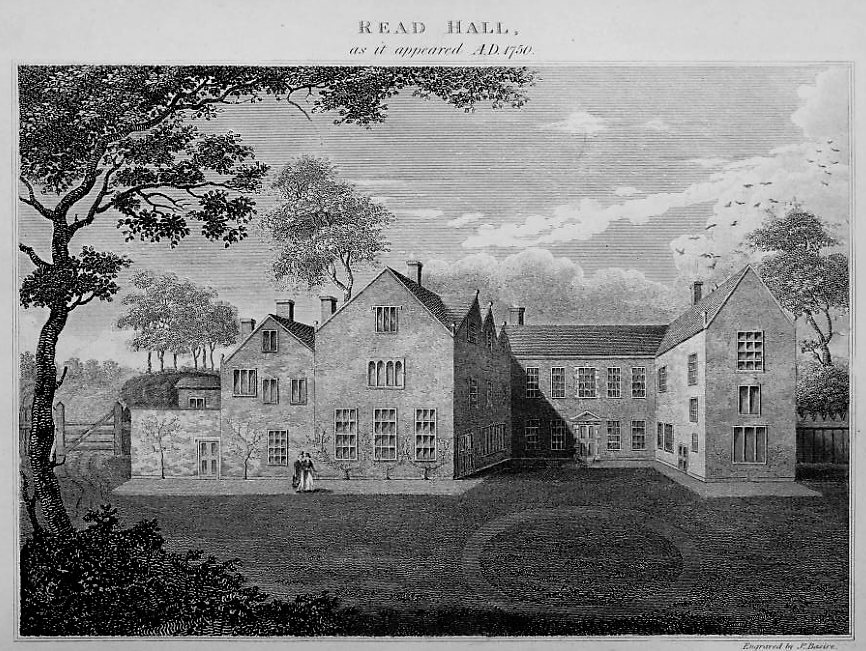
The old Read Hall in the 18th century

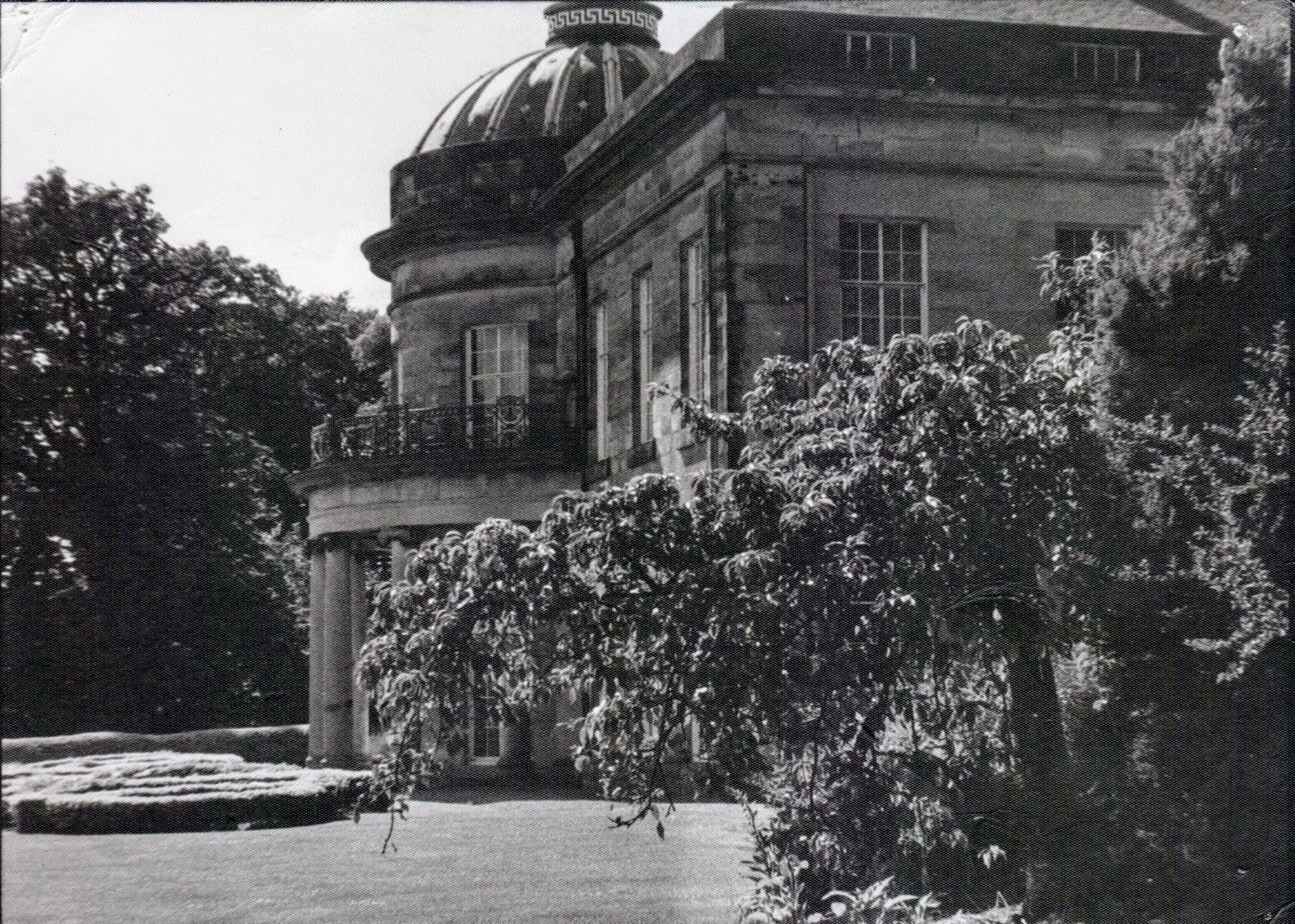
Read Hall in 1975

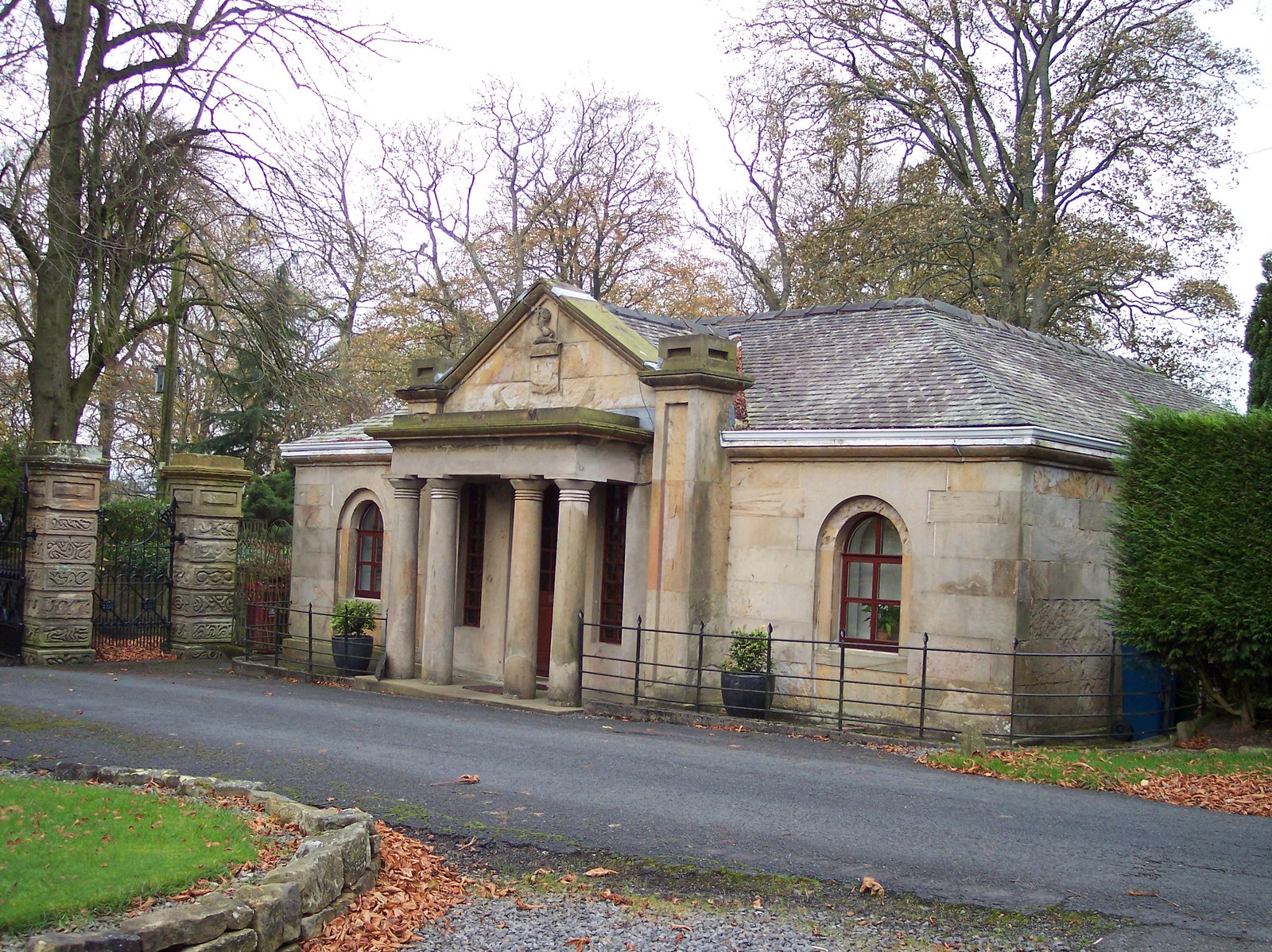
The lodge at the Whalley Road entrance

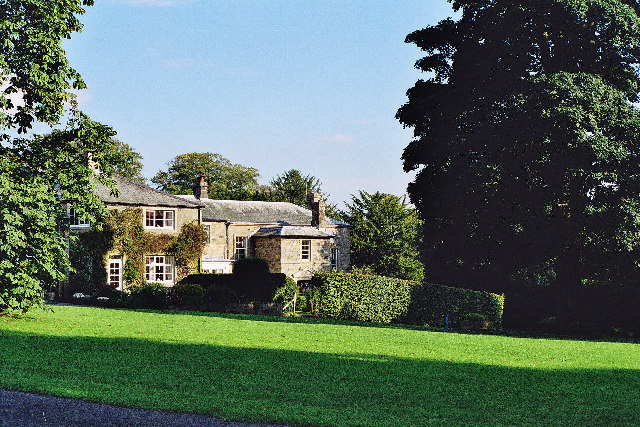
Read Hall Farm

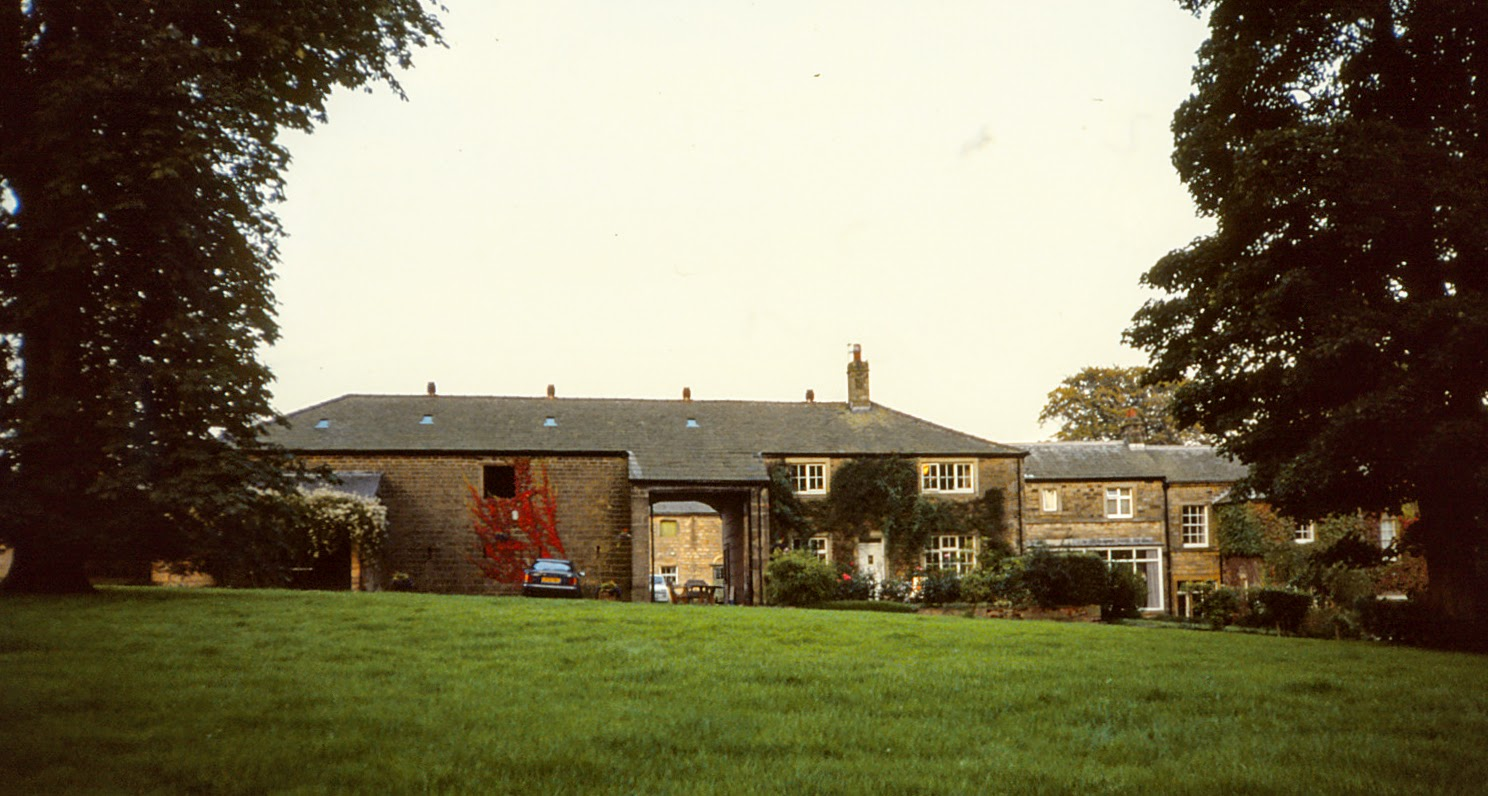
Read Hall Cottage and Farm

== See also ==
- Grade II* listed buildings in Lancashire
- Listed buildings in Read, Lancashire
- List of works by George Webster
