= Martholme Viaduct =

Multi-arched rail viaduct over a river

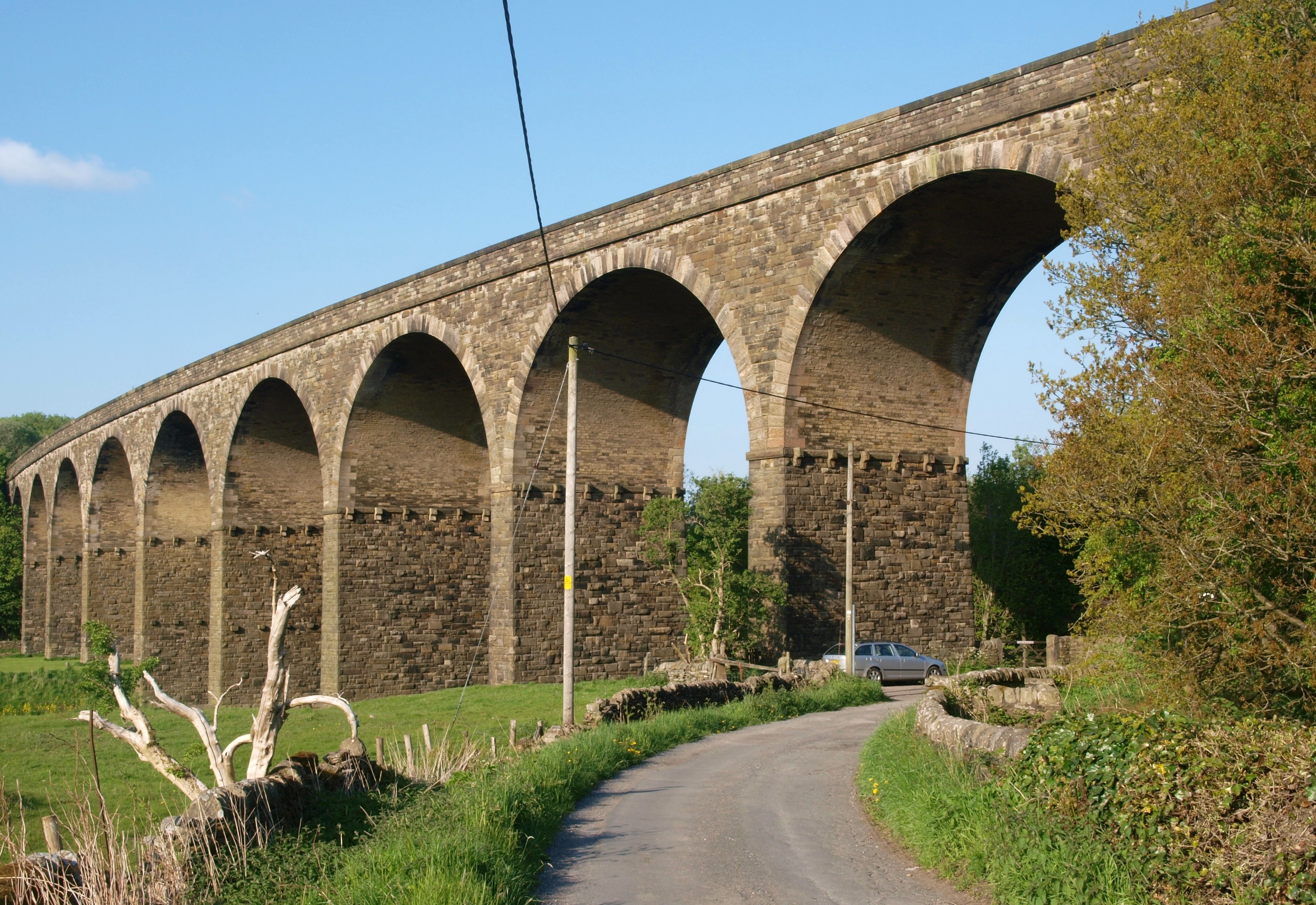
- Coordinates: 53.8004°N 2.3788°W
- Crosses: River Calder, Lancashire

Characteristics
- Material: Sandstone rubble
- Height: 65 feet (20 m)
- No. of spans: 10

History
- Engineering design by: Sturges Meek
- Constructed by: Thomas Stone & Son
- Construction start: 1870
- Construction end: 1877
- Closed: 1957

Listed Building – Grade II
- Designated: 9 March 1984
- Reference no.: 1362005

Location
- Interactive map of Martholme Viaduct

Martholme Viaduct is a railway bridge near Great Harwood in Lancashire, north-western England. It was built from 1870 and opened in 1877 after construction was beset by landslips. It closed in 1954 and is now a cycle way. It is a Grade II listed building.

== History ==
The viaduct was built to carry the Great Harwood Loop (also known as the North Lancashire Loop) of the East Lancashire Line, owned by the Lancashire and Yorkshire Railway (LYR). It crosses the River Calder between Great Harwood and Read and was designed by Sturges Meek, the LYR's chief engineer. Construction began in 1870 but was beset with problems and the line did not open until. The line required deep cuttings at one end, the spoil from which was to be used to build the embankments needed at the other end, which required it to be transported a distance of around three miles (five kilometres). A large coalfield is located underneath the route and a colliery was located near the site of the river crossing, which led to concerns about the stability of the ground. Thus, the railway originally proposed a lightweight wooden viaduct but it eventually purchased the coal measures at the insistence of the engineering contractors, Thomas Stone & Son, which enabled a stone viaduct to be built with confidence. Subsidence was a problem nonetheless—the embankments on either side of the viaduct continually slipped, including on one occasion shortly before the line was due to open, when the rails were carried away. Most of the line closed in 1957 and the viaduct with it. The remainder of the line closed in 1964.

== Description ==
The viaduct is 170 yards (160 metres) on a sharp curve. It is built from snecked gritstone (local sandstone) and faced with rock with brick soffits. It has ten semi-circular arches, each of 40 feet (12 metres) span, and reaches a maximum height of 65 feet (20 metres) above the valley. The arches spring from impost bands. Above them is a solid parapet.

The viaduct is now part of a walking and cycling trail. It is a Grade II listed building, a status which provides it with legal protection, first designated in March 1984.

== See also ==
- Listed buildings in Great Harwood
- Listed buildings in Read, Lancashire
- List of railway bridges and viaducts in the United Kingdom
