= River Calder, Lancashire =

Tributary of the River Ribble in England

Coordinates: 53.8297°N 2.44°W

River Calder
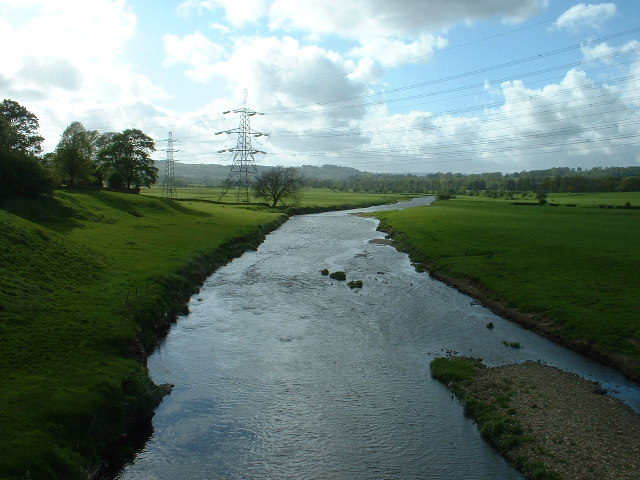
- The River Calder at Altham

Location
- Country: England

Physical characteristics
- Source
  - location: Calderhead, Cliviger, Lancashire
  - elevation: 758 ft (231 m)
- Mouth
  - location: River Ribble near Brockhall Village
  - elevation: 100 ft (30 m)
- Length: 20 mi (32 km)

The River Calder is a major tributary of the River Ribble in Lancashire, England, and is around 20 miles (32 km) in length. (Note: Measured using mapping website.)

== Course ==
Starting in Cliviger, its source is very close to that of the West Yorkshire river with the same name, and that of the River Irwell. It flows northwest through the Cliviger Gorge supplying two fish ponds near Pot Oven Farm, before collecting Green Clough as it passes the Holme and Black Clough near St John's Church at Holme Chapel. As the Valley widens, the Calder is met by Easden Clough near Southward Bottom and continues to Walk Mill. At the Cliviger Bridge it passes under A646 Burnley Road and it collects Dick Clough near Barcroft Hall before entering Towneley Park and being joined by Everage Clough.

On the Burnley side of the park it passes Unity College and Fulledge Recreation Ground, and under the Hand Bridge which carries the A671 Todmorden Road. It flows on the northern side of the town's Burnley Wood district and through a culvert in the Burnley Embankment on the Leeds and Liverpool Canal and on through the town centre. It is again culverted, first as it is crossed by Centenary Way and then again at Parker Lane, before running under Chaddesley House and Manchester Road next to the Town Hall and Mechanics Theatre. It is then crossed by Hammerton Street before flowing under the old Empire Music Hall and Cow Lane as it meanders to the west and is crossed by St. James's Street, then joined by the River Brun just before the Active Way bridge. Turning to the north and under the East Lancashire railway line viaduct and through the site of Burnley College and under the M65 motorway as it leaves the town. It collects Barden Clough near Royle and is shortly after joined by Pendle Water at Burnley Wastewater Treatment Works (also known as Duck Pits) on the edge of Reedley Hallows parish.

It is met by Spurn Clough and Moor Isles Clough as it turns sharply to the south west past Ightenhill and collects Whitaker Clough near Gawthorpe Hall and continues through the town of Padiham where it is met by Green Brook. It is joined by Castle Clough Brook as it passes the old Padiham Power Station before collecting Dean Brook and then Shorten Brook as it flows past St James' Church at Altham. Crossed here by the A678 Burnley Road, the river turns northwest and the meanders become more pronounced as it is met by Simonstone Brook, Syke Side Brook and then Hyndburn Brook at Hyndburn Wastewater Treatment Works near Great Harwood. Continuing its winding route it is then crossed by the old railway viaduct at Martholme, and shortly afterward it is joined by Sabden Brook, just before flowing under the A680 Accrington Road at Cock Bridge. Turning to the north and the back to the west as it is met by Rodger Hey and Egg Syke Brooks and another Dean Brook, it approaches Whalley. Here it runs over the corn mill weir and under Whalley Bridge before it passes the ruins of Whalley Abbey, and is then crossed by the red brick Whalley Viaduct. After flowing under the A59 bypass, it collects Bushburn Brook and then meets the Ribble near Brockhall Village.

== History ==
The name Calder is relatively common and thought to originate from the ancient British language, the first part may be the ancestor of the Welsh word caled (hard), with the second being *dubron (water), giving a possible meaning of the rapid river. There is some uncertainty that the name has always been applied to the current route in the Burnley area, as at the confluence with Pendle Water it is the Calder that is the smaller watercourse. And in Yates' 1786 map of Lancashire it is the lower section of Pendle Water that is labelled as the Calder. However both William Harrison's Description of England, first published in 1577, and Camden's Britannia both appear to support the route as it is named today.

The fishponds at Cliviger are possibly over 200 years old, dating from Thomas Dunham Whitaker's time and were restored in 1990 by a private angling club. In the 1840s, a third pond was located upstream of the surviving two. At the Pot Oven Farm site, there are also the remains of a blast furnace constructed around 1700 for the Spencer partnership. Although it had become a pottery by 1760, it is thought to be the first of this type of furnace built in Lancashire.

The approximately 400 metres (1,312 ft) long, 15-arch sandstone railway viaduct at Burnley was built in 1847–48 for the East Lancashire Railway.

In its passage east of Padiham the river was diverted in the 19th century away from Gawthorpe Hall because of pollution, being restored to the original route in the 1960s.

A weir built in the 1950s to allow Padiham Power Station to take water from the river was removed in 2010 along with other improvements to aid the passage of fish upstream.

The core of the bridge at Whalley is possibly contemporary with the abbey, although it must have been extended and was certainly widened several times over the centuries, most recently in 1914. The old Roman road between Ribchester and Elslack (part of Margary 72a), crossed the Calder further downstream, close to the river mouth.

During 2014, an Archimedean screw type hydropower station was constructed on the old weir at Whalley and included preservation work on the weir and the installation of a fish pass. Built for Whalley Community Hydro, the site became operational at the end of the year and is expected to generate an average 345,000 kWh of electricity annually.

Heavy rainfall across Northern England over Christmas 2015 saw record water levels in the river and caused flooding in Whalley and Padiham.

== Gallery ==
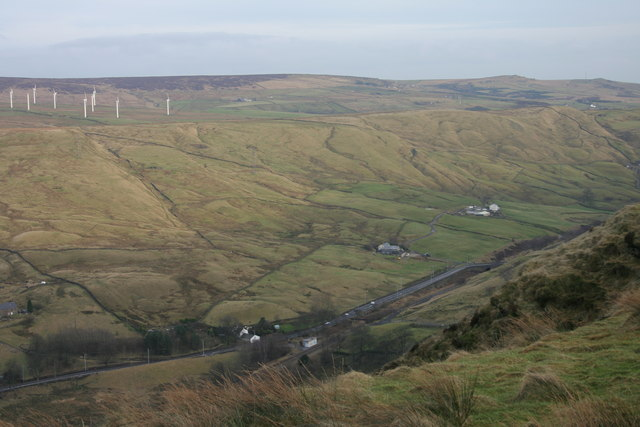
The source of the Calder in Cliviger Gorge.

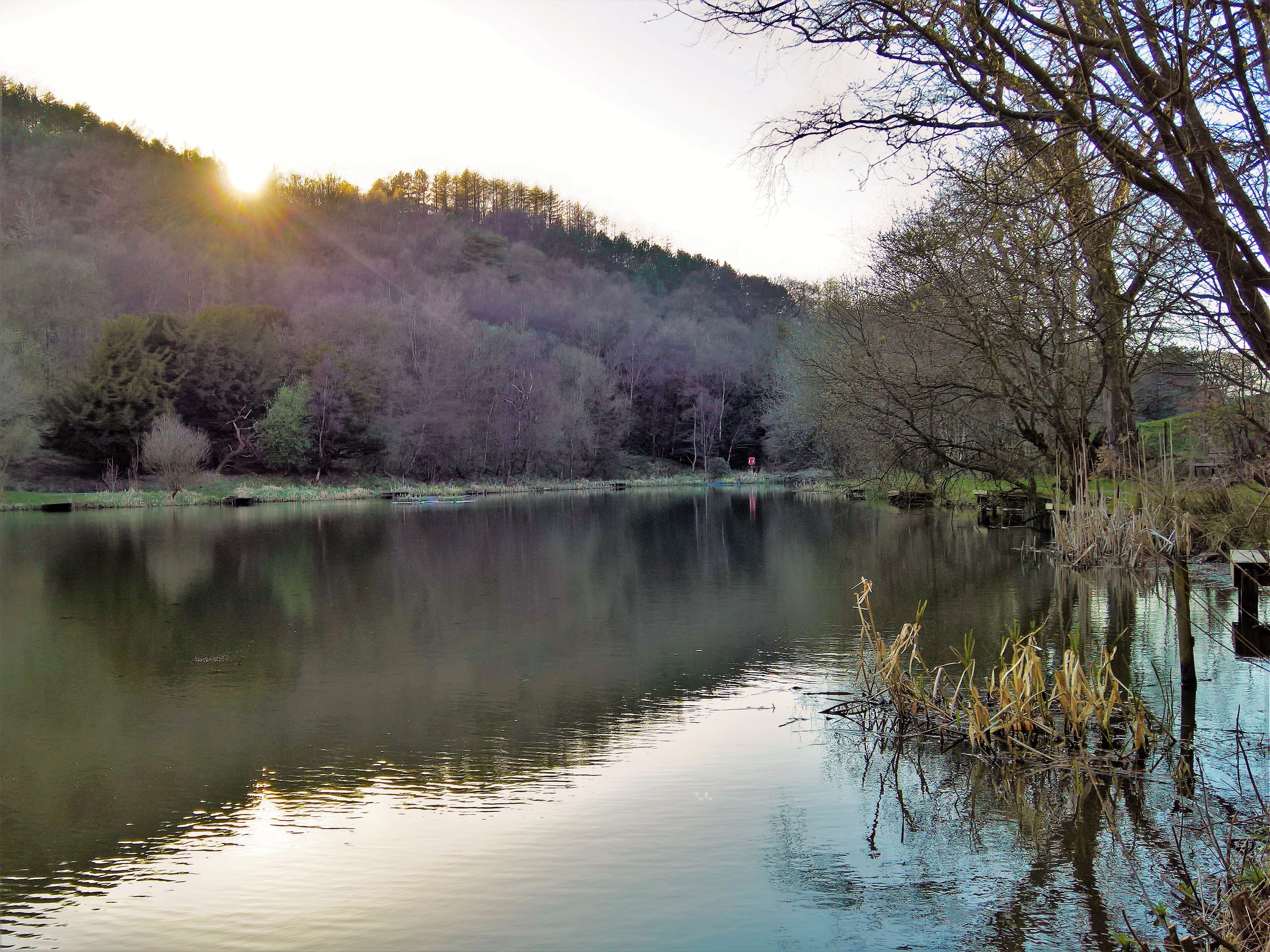
The upper fish pond at Cliviger.

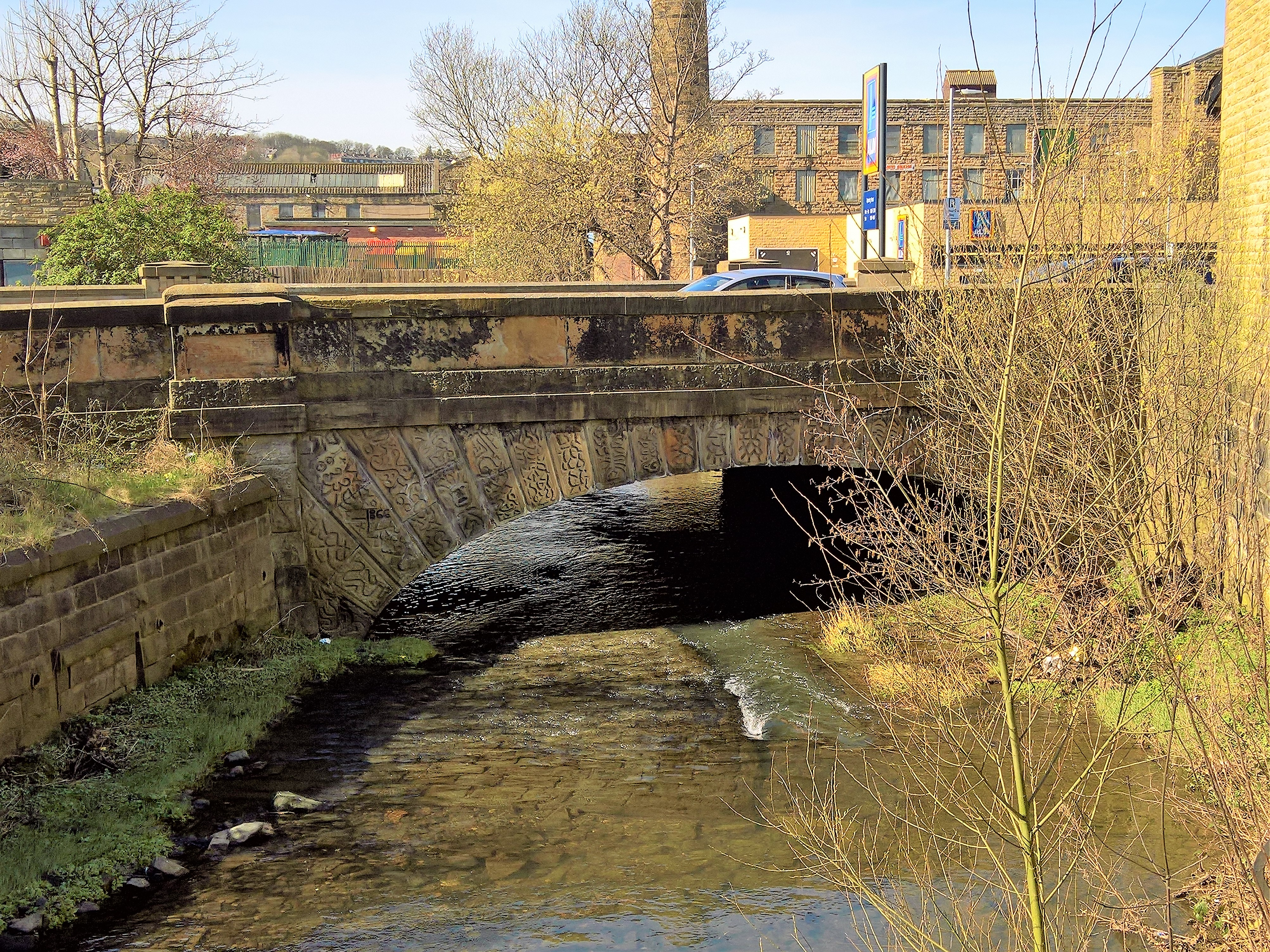
Todmorden Road, Burnley

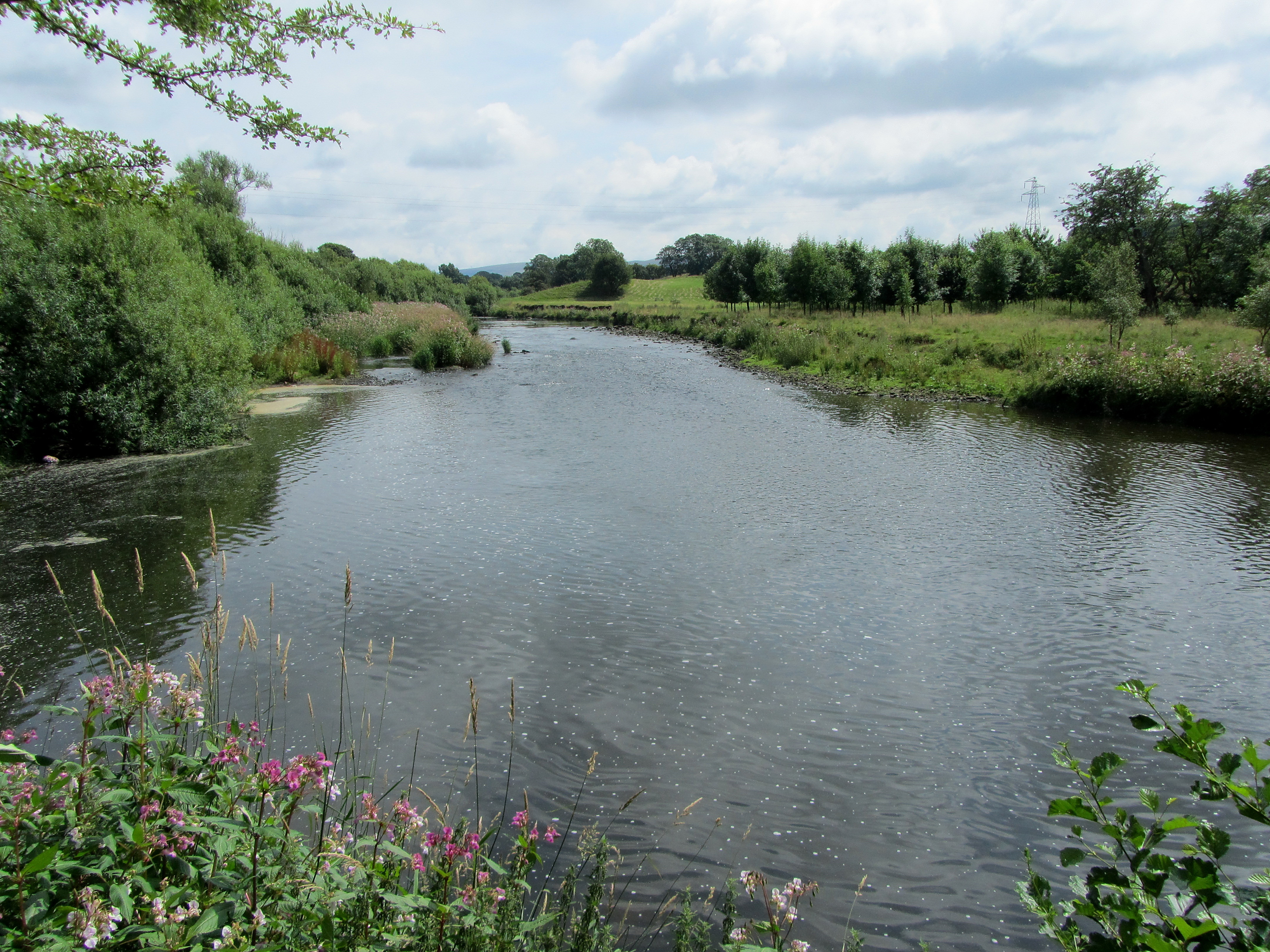
After collecting Pendle Water near Ightenhill.

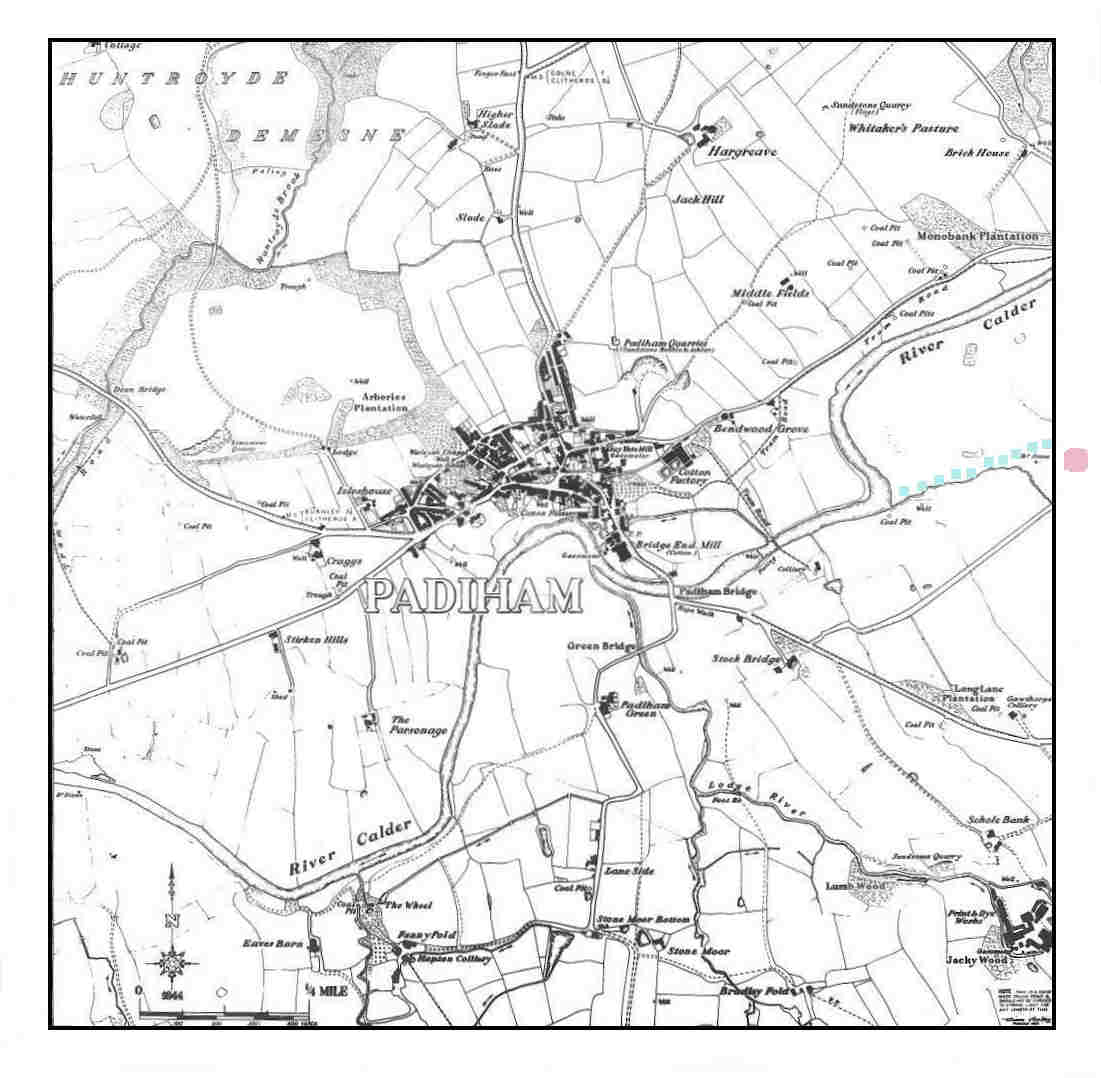
Padiham c. 1844, highlighting the modified route.

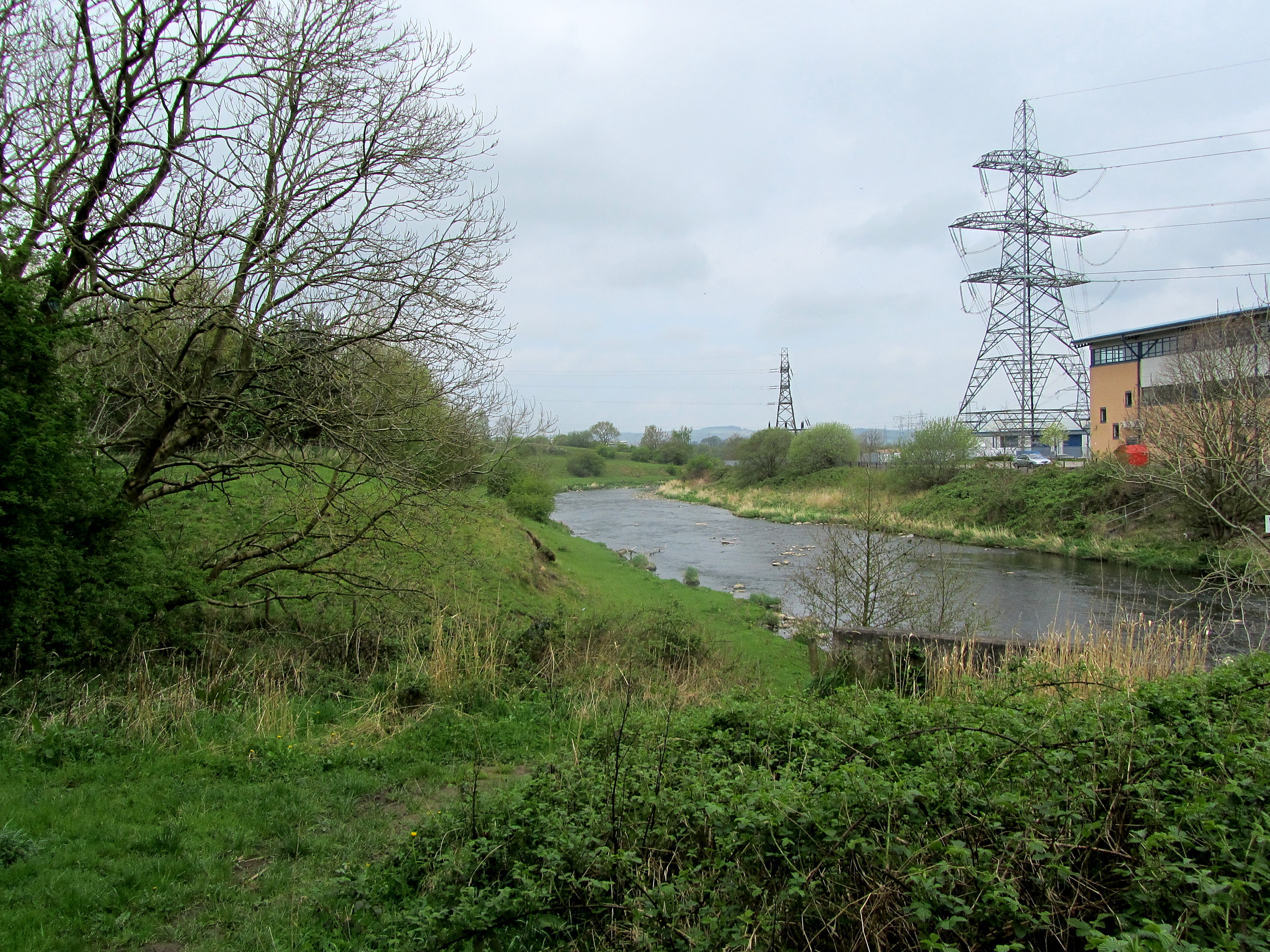
Near the old Padiham Power Station.

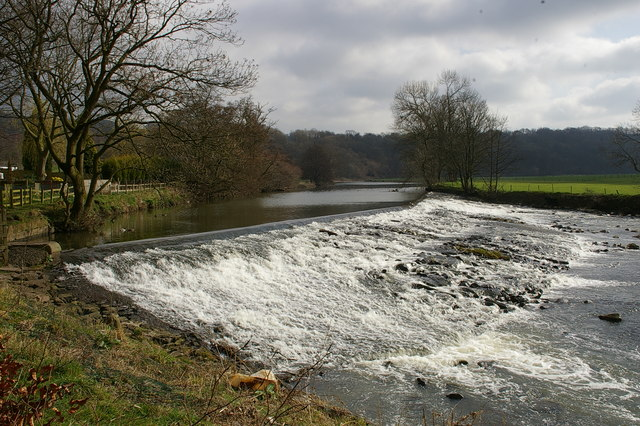
The weir at Whalley.

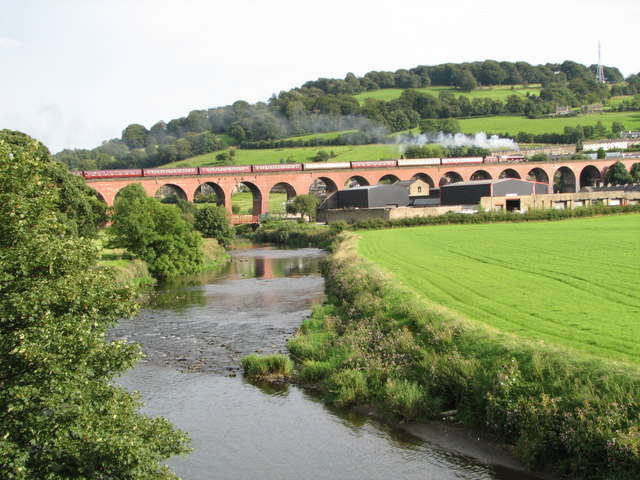
Whalley Viaduct.

== Settlements ==
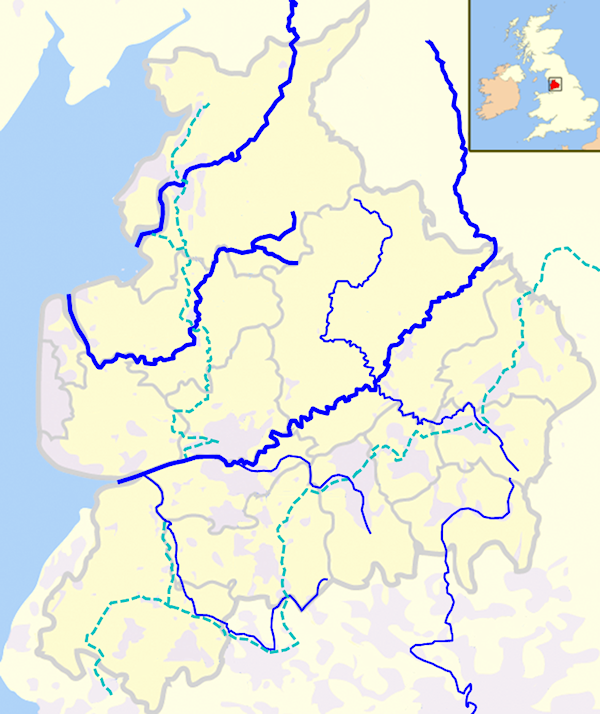
Shown within Lancashire

The following towns and villages are situated along the river:

- Brockhall Village
- Whalley
- Altham
- Padiham
- Burnley
- Walk Mill
- Holme Chapel

== Tributaries ==
These tributaries have Wikipedia articles:

- Sabden Brook
- Hyndburn Brook

- River Hyndburn

- Green Brook
- Pendle Water

- Walverden Water
- Colne Water

- Trawden Brook, Wycoller Beck, River Laneshaw

- River Brun

- River Don

Next confluence upstream	River Ribble	Next confluence downstream
River Hodder (North)	River Calder, Lancashire	Dinckley Brook (South)
