= Listed buildings in Clayton-le-Moors =

Clayton-le-Moors is a town in Hyndburn, Lancashire, England. It contains 16 listed buildings, which are designated by English Heritage and recorded in the National Heritage List for England. Of these, one is listed at Grade II*, the middle grade, and the others are at Grade II. Before the arrival of the Leeds and Liverpool Canal in about 1800 the area was mainly rural, and the older listed buildings are large houses, farmhouses, and associated structures. Associated with the canal are a warehouse, office, house and stables. The newer listed buildings include a church and its vicarage, and a war memorial.

== Key ==
Grade	Criteria
II*	Particularly important buildings of more than special interest
II	Buildings of national importance and special interest

== Buildings ==
Name and location	Photograph	Date	Notes	Grade
Barn, Clayton Hall Farm; 53.78405°N 2.37832°W	—	16th century (possible)	A cruck-framed barn, with a shippon added later. It is in stone with a roof mainly in slate and partly in corrugated sheet. The building has a rectangular plan, the barn having five bays and containing four full cruck trusses. It contains opposing wagon doors and various windows. The shippon has a loft and a modern roof.	II
Sparth Manor; 53.77884°N 2.38648°W	—	Early to mid-17th century (probable)	Originally a farmhouse, later converted into a restaurant, it is sandstone with a roof of stone-slate. It has two storeys and three bays, with an additional bay to the left. There is a short rear wing, a two-storey stair turret, and a two-storey gabled porch with stepped windows. The windows are mullioned.	II*
Stable block, Dunkenhalgh Hall; 53.76631°N 2.39510°W		18th century	The stable block, later used for other purposes, is in sandstone with a concrete tile roof. It is a symmetrical building in two storeys, with a central arcade of three segmental-headed arches. On each side are symmetrical bays with central doors, two ground floor windows, and two bullseye windows above.	II
Holt Mill Cottages; 53.76989°N 2.40079°W	—	Mid-18th century (probable)	Originally two cottages, later converted into one house, it is in sandstone with a stone-slate roof. There are two storeys and a symmetrical two-bay front. On the front is a gabled porch containing a side bench. Apart from one sliding sash at the rear, the windows are mullioned.	II
Building, Clayton Hall Farm; 53.78406°N 2.37787°W	—	Late 18th century (probable)	The original purpose of the building is unknown. It is in sandstone with a roof of corrugated sheet, with two storeys, and a symmetrical three-bay front. In the centre is a doorway, now converted into a window, with a moulded cornice, and in the upper floor are two bullseye windows.	II
Holt Mill House; 53.76990°N 2.40040°W	—	Late 18th century (probable)	This originated as a public house, and was later a private house, it is in sandstone painted white, with quoins painted black, and has a concrete tile roof. There are two storeys with an attic, and a three-bay front. The doorway has imposts and a fanlight.	II
Ice house 53.78380°N 2.37679°W	—	Late 18th century (probable)	The ice house to the former Clayton Hall consists of a flat-topped mound surrounded by a stone wall. A porch leads to a vaulted passage, which leads in turn to a vaulted cellar with a doorway.	II
Sparth House; 53.77913°N 2.38490°W	—	Late 18th century	A house in rendered stone with a slate roof in Georgian style. It has three storeys, a symmetrical three-bay front, and a two-storey service wing on the left side. The central doorway has Tuscan pilasters, an open pediment, and a fanlight. The windows are sashes.	II
Canal stable block 53.77022°N 2.38352°W		1801–02	The former stables are on the east side of the Leeds and Liverpool Canal. They are in sandstone with a slate roof, and have two storeys with a rectangular plan. On the ground floor are three wide segmental-headed doorways, and above are windows.	II
Mercer House; 53.77554°N 2.39063°W	—	1802	A stone house with a slate roof, it has two storeys and three bays, with a service wing at the rear. The house has a moulded cornice and a parapet. The doorway has an architrave with an open pediment and a semicircular fanlight. The windows are sashes.	II
Canal warehouses, offices and house 53.77004°N 2.38401°W		1801–02	On the west side of the Leeds and Liverpool Canal, the buildings are in sandstone with roofs of slate and corrugated sheet. They have an L-shaped plan with two storeys. The warehouse has a front of eight bays, with loading doors and windows, most of which are mullioned. To the left are a small square office with a pyramidal roof and external stairs, and behind it is a two-bay house.	II
Dunkenhalgh Hotel; 53.76659°N 2.39568°W		c. 1815–20	Originally a large country house in Tudor style, later converted into a hotel, it incorporates some 17th-century fabric. Built in sandstone that is partly rendered, it has roofs of slate with some stone-slate. There are two storeys, and the building has a complex T-shaped plan. The entrance front is embattled with five asymmetrical bays. There is a single-storey porch, and the outer bays form towers, the east tower having crow-stepped parapets. On top of the building is a glazed circular lantern.	II
All Saints' Church; 53.77387°N 2.38813°W		1838–40	The church, designed by John Harper in Early English style, was extended in 1882. It is in sandstone with a slate roof, and consists of a nave, a chancel, a vestry and organ house, and a west tower. The tower has three stages, with buttresses, a doorway, a circular window, tall stepped lancets and gargoyles in the bell stage, and a parapet with corner pinnacles, and smaller pinnacles between. Inside the church are galleries on three sides, and the furnishings all date from 1882.	II
All Saints Vicarage; 53.77349°N 2.38895°W	—	c. 1840	The vicarage is in sandstone with a slate roof, it is in Tudor style, and has an L-shaped plan. There are two storeys, with two gables on the front. Both gables have bay windows with embattled parapets. The windows are mullioned.	II
War memorial 53.77447°N 2.38927°W		1920	The war memorial is in Mercer Park, and was designed by John Cassidy. It consists of a tall stone plinth on which are standing bronze statues of a soldier in battledress holding a rifle, and a personification of Victory, with one arm on his shoulder. On the sides of the plinth are inscribed panels of Westmorland slate.	II
Building, Henfield House Garden; 53.76831°N 2.38978°W	—	Uncertain	The building is of unknown purpose and is ruinous. It consists of two connected rectangular structures containing boulders, and with features including iron trusses for a former roof, an arched Gothick doorway on one side, and on the other side a doorway with a Tuscan architrave, a moulded cornice, and a pediment.	II
