= Stydd Brook =

Watercourse in Lancashire, England

Coordinates: 53.8115°N 2.5308°W

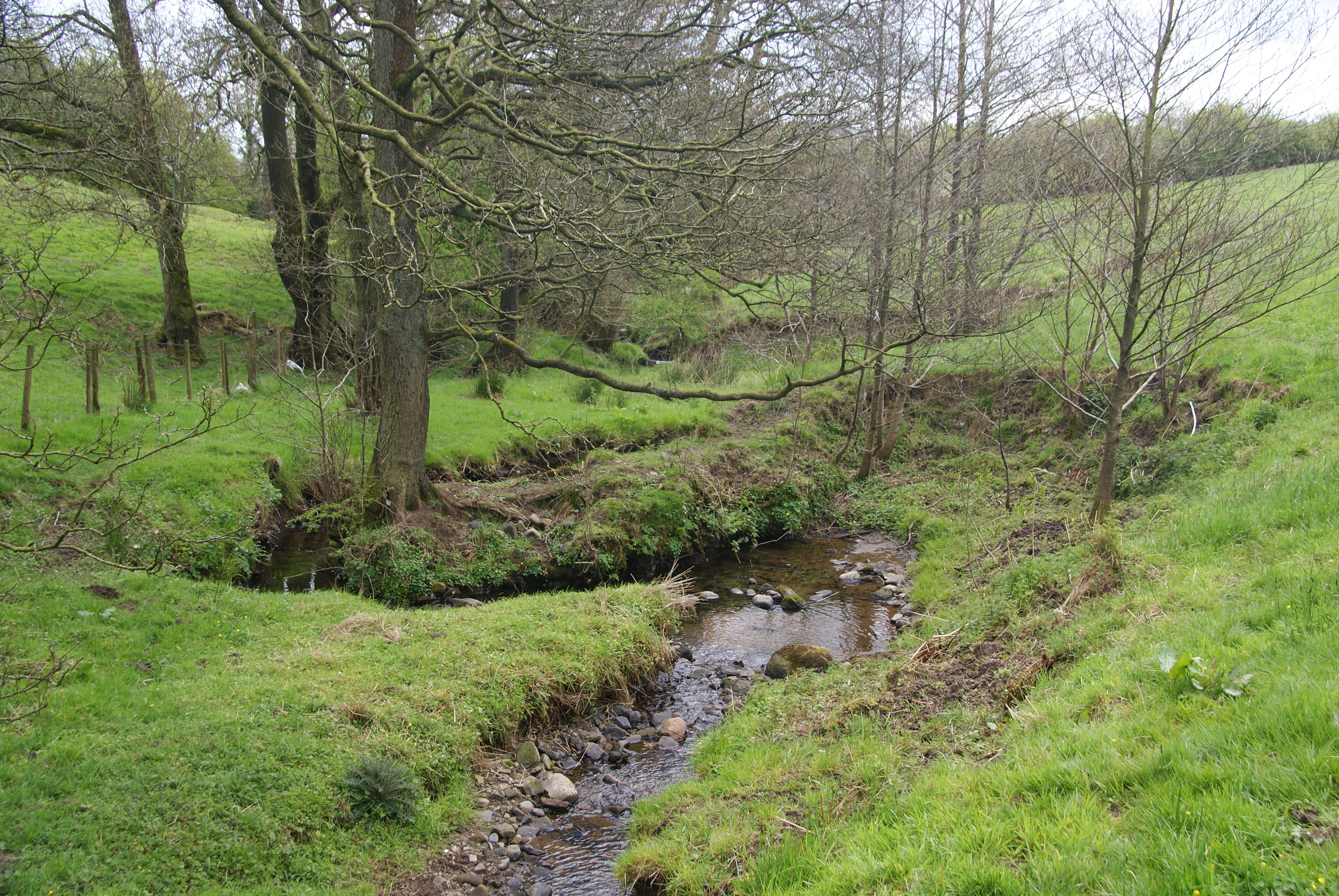
Stydd Brook near Cox Farm

Stydd Brook is a watercourse in Lancashire, England.

Rising on Gannow Fell, south west of the Forest of Bowland, the river flows southward, meeting the River Ribble at Ribchester.

Stydd Brook flows by Black Plantation then between Moor Nook Farm and Davies Gate, before moving through Stydd Wood.

== Tributaries ==
Boyce's Brook rises at the confluence of Cowley Brook (flowing southwards from Longridge Fell) and Page Brook (draining the Spade Mill Reservoirs near Longridge and flowing east) close to the hamlet of Buckley Gate. From there, the brook moves southeast through Buckley Wood, before skirting north around Ribchester to meet Stydd Brook under Stone Bridge.

A little further upstream from this confluence, Duddel Brook joins Stydd Brook. Duddel Brook flows south from its source near Lennox Farm, on the eastern slopes of Gannow Fell, flowing through Hougher Fall Wood, Over Hey Wood, then Duddel Wood and Little Stydd Wood.

Next confluence upstream	River Ribble	Next confluence downstream
Dinckley Brook (South)	Stydd Brook	River Darwen (South)
