= Dunkenhalgh =

House in Hyndburn, Lancashire, England

The Dunkenhalgh
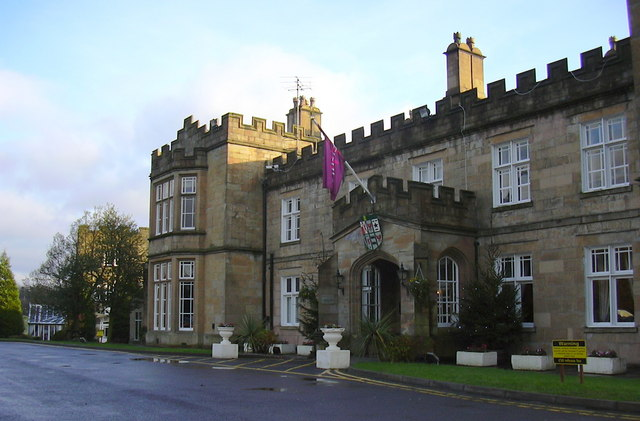
- The Dunkenhalgh in 2005
- Interactive map of the The Dunkenhalgh area

General information
- Location: Clayton-le-Moors, England
- Coordinates: 53.76659°N 2.39568°W

The Dunkenhalgh is a country manor in Lancashire, on the outskirts of Clayton-le-Moors near the river Hyndburn. Originally a large country house in Tudor style, it was later converted into a hotel. It is grade II listed.

== History ==
The name Dunkenhalgh comes from Roger de Dunkenhalgh who built the house by the end of the 12th century. In 1332 it came into the hands of the Rishton family who sold it to the Walmsley family in 1571. In 1712 it passed to the Petres. In 1947 the house was sold and converted into a hotel. The hall is currently owned by the Mercure Hotel chain.

== Description of the house ==
The current building is described in its listing as substantially nineteenth-century but incorporating parts of c. 1600 construction.

It is built in sandstone that is partly rendered, it has roofs of slate with some stone-slate. There are two storeys, and the building has a complex T-shaped plan. The entrance front is embattled with five asymmetrical bays. There is a single-storey porch, and the outer bays form towers, the east tower having crow-stepped parapets. On top of the building is a glazed circular lantern. There are several family portraits in the Portrait Room. Since 1950 the house has undergone many changes and extensions.

== See also ==
- Listed buildings in Clayton-le-Moors
