= Dinckley Brook =

River in Lancashire, England

Coordinates: 53.8303°N 2.4675°W

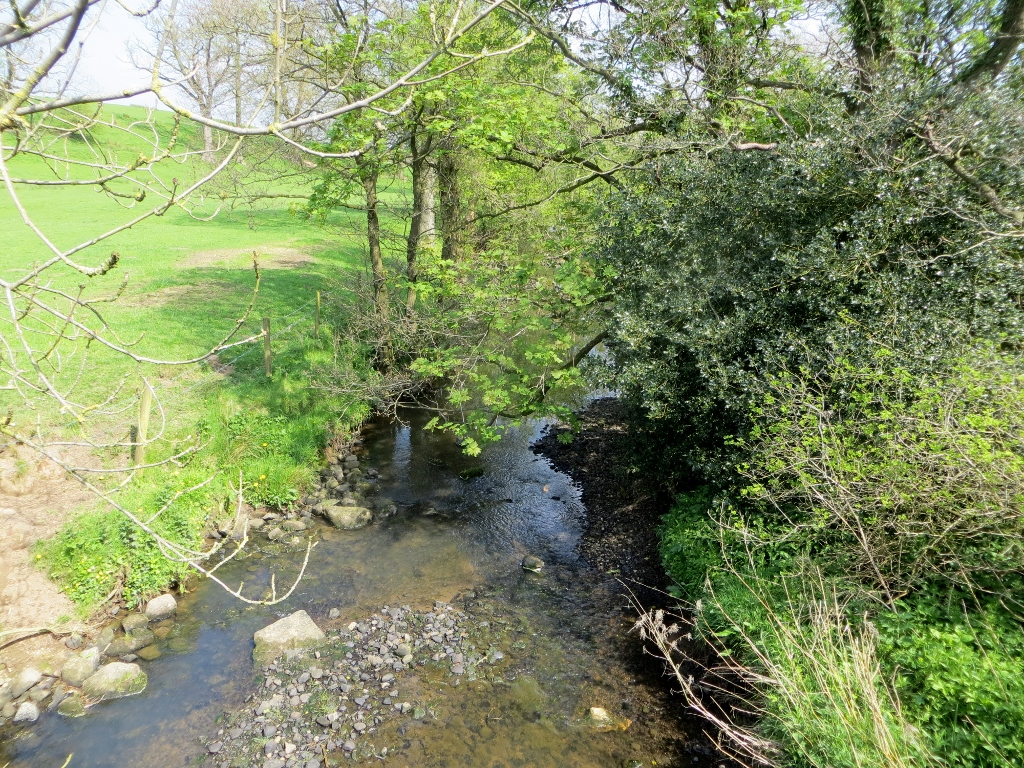
Dinckley Brook

Dinckley Brook is a minor river of Lancashire, England. The stream rises at the confluence of several minor watercourses at Wheatley Farm close to Copster Green and flows northwards, through Cunliffe House Wood and under Dinckley Bridge (near to where it meets Park Brook). The brook continues past Brockhall, Great Wood and Bradyll, continuing past the Brockhall training base of Blackburn Rovers and through Mill Wood. Soon afterwards, Dinckley Brook falls into the River Ribble.

== Tributaries ==
Park Brook joins Dinckley Brook close to Dinckley Bridge. The source of this stream is at Showley Fold Farm, where Showley Brook is joined by Tottering Brook (travelling east from Hawkshaw Fold, just east of Osbaldeston) and Zechariah Brook (moving north from Hillside at "Top of Ramsgreave").

Showley Brook itself drains Wilpshire, moving westwards. It is fed at Wilpshire by Knotts Brook, which itself feeds Parsonage Reservoir.

Next confluence upstream	River Ribble	Next confluence downstream
River Calder (South)	Dinckley Brook	Stydd Brook (North)
