= Sabden Brook =

River in Lancashire, England

Coordinates: 53.8026°N 2.3861°W

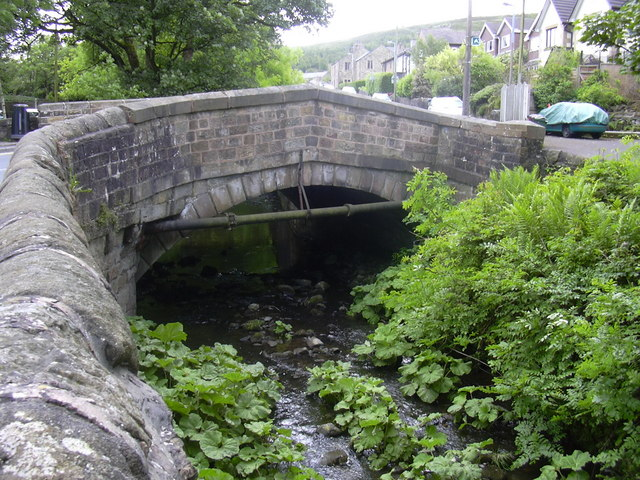
Sabden Brook passing through the village of Sabden (June 2009)

Sabden Brook is a small river running through Lancashire in England. It is 7.59 miles (12.21 km) long and has a catchment area of 6.84 square miles (17.723 km^{2}). Rising just to the west of Newchurch-in-Pendle, Sabden Brook moves westward through its well-defined valley past Sabden Hall to the village of Sabden east of the town of Whalley.

From there the brook turns southwesterly, widening out overlooked by Wiswell Moor and the ancient hillfort at Portfield, before conjoining with the waters of the River Calder at Cock Bridge near Read. Sabden is believed to have been derived from Old English words sæppe denu, meaning valley of the spruce trees. Brook (OE broc) is a common name for a stream most often found in southern and central England.

Next confluence upstream	River Calder	Next confluence downstream
Hyndburn Brook (South)	Sabden Brook	-
