= Green Brook, Lancashire =

River in Lancashire, England

Coordinates: 53.791713°N 2.296617°W

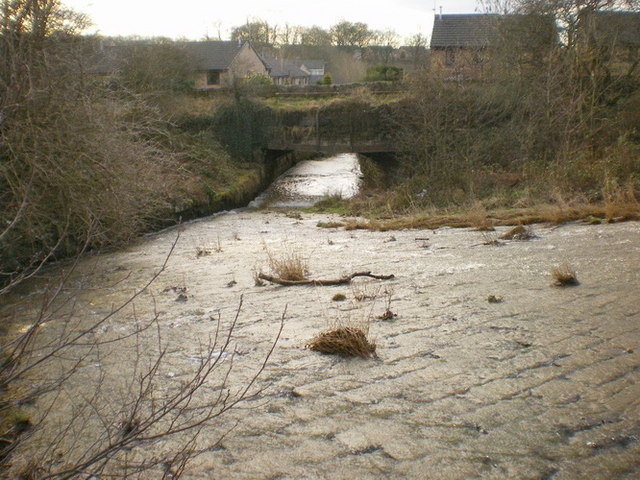
Green Brook leaving the old mill lodge at Lowerhouse, Burnley (2009)

Green Brook is a minor river in Lancashire, England. It is 2.32 miles (3.73 km) long, and including tributaries, has the catchment area of 7.02 square miles (1,818.28 ha).

Green Brook begins at the confluence of Hapton Clough and Habergham Clough in Spa Wood, next to the cemetery of Burnley. Hapton Clough is the product of Thorny Bank Clough and Tower Brook, which meet near Old Barn Farm, in Hapton. While Habergham Clough begins at the confluence of New Barn Clough and Micklehurst Clough, near Iron House Farm, in Habergham Eaves.

From Spa Wood, Green Brook heads north, into one tunnel, which passes under the A679 Accrington Road, the Leeds and Liverpool Canal, the East Lancashire Railway Line, and the M65 Motorway, to emerge at Lowerhouse Lodges. In Lowerhouse, it collects Sweet Clough, and turns west into Padiham, where it collects Shaw Brook, and then continues northwest, flowing into the River Calder in the centre of the town.

Next confluence upstream	River Calder	Next confluence downstream
Pendle Water (North)	Green Brook, Lancashire	Hyndburn Brook (South)
