= Oakenshaw, Lancashire =

Coordinates: 53.779°N 2.391°W

Oakenshaw
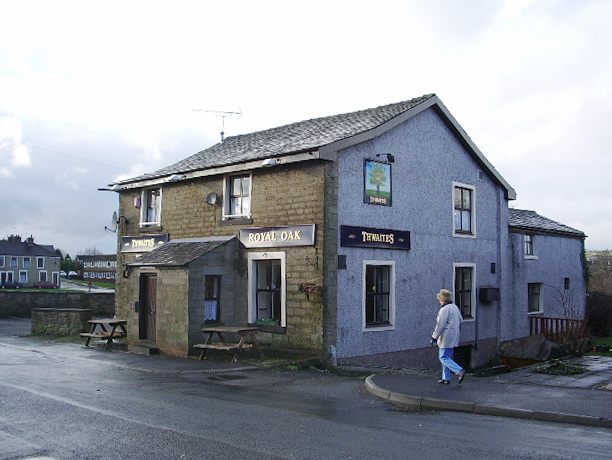
- The Royal Oak public house

- Location in Hyndburn Location within Lancashire
- OS grid reference: SD742315
- District: Hyndburn
- Shire county: Lancashire
- Region: North West
- Country: England
- Sovereign state: United Kingdom
- Post town: ACCRINGTON
- Postcode district: BB5
- Dialling code: 01254
- Police: Lancashire
- Fire: Lancashire
- Ambulance: North West
- UK Parliament: Hyndburn

Oakenshaw is part of Clayton-le-Moors in Lancashire, England.

Thomas de Clayton was the first grantee of Oakenshaw in the middle of the 11th-century. A Calico printworks was established here (on Hyndburn Brook) by J Peel in the late 18th century.

== History ==
The history of Oakenshaw is bound up with the cotton fabric printing industry, specifically the Oakenshaw Print Works, which employed many residents of the village in the first half of the 19th century. The history of the Oakenshaw Print Works cannot be separated from the career of Oakenshaw's most notable resident, the dye and fabric chemist, John Mercer. (He is remembered in the word mercerisation, a process used in textile finishing.) Mercer moved to Oakenshaw in 1809 as an apprentice at the Oakenshaw Print Works.

Napoleon's embargo of British trade with the continent of Europe caused a depression in the print works of Lancashire. After 1810, the Berlin Decree, which forced the destruction of goods held in bond, stifled trade so much that the Oakenshaw Print Works reduced its work force. In part, this was done by voluntary redundancy of apprentices, including Mercer.

Messrs. Fort recognised the value that Mercer brought to the company and made him a partner in 1825 to secure his continued services. The company prospered despite an excise duty on printed calico (until it was abolished in 1831).

Mercer and his and his wife were active members of the Wesleyan society. He established a Sunday school in the village about 1815. In 1829, a Wesleyan chapel was built at Oakenshaw. It was the only Protestant place of worship for many years.

In 1837, Messrs. Fort thanked Mercer for his religious effort and granted the chapel property and burial-ground. In 1840, the Church of All Saints, Clayton-le-Moors was consecrated, a result of Mercer's sense of responsibility for providing facilities for public worship in the village.

The company helped Mercer to form a lending library and a few years later built a house for a public reading room.

Mercer introduced several novel styles of calico prints. Some of these were so popular in the Manchester market that the Oakenshaw Works couldn't keep up with demand. Another style became known as "dole yellow" because its introduction provided employment to many workers who had previously been receiving relief ("dole") from the firm due to lack of work. Mercer had a high opinion of Oakenshaw workers saying "as regards good practical men, no district could excel Lancashire".

Nearing the middle of the century, competition grew from heavy production of cheaper goods rather than the quality product of the Oakenshaw Printworks. Consequently, in 1848 the principal partners decided to retire and the partnership was dissolved.
