= Walverden Water =

River in Lancashire, England

Coordinates: 53.843°N 2.215°W

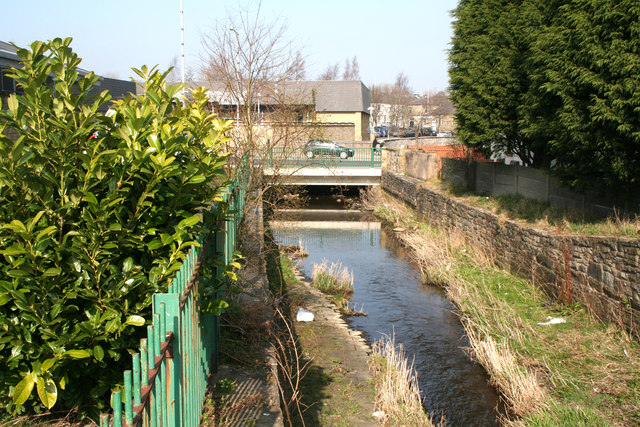
- Walverden Water and the Leeds Road bridge.

Location
- Country: England

Physical characteristics
- Source
  - location: Walverden Reservoir, southeast of Nelson, Lancashire.
  - elevation: 173.7 m (570 ft)
- Mouth
  - location: Pendle Water, west of Nelson.
  - elevation: 114 m (375 ft)
- Length: 2.6 mi (4.2 km)
- Basin size: 5.04 square miles (1,304.23 ha)

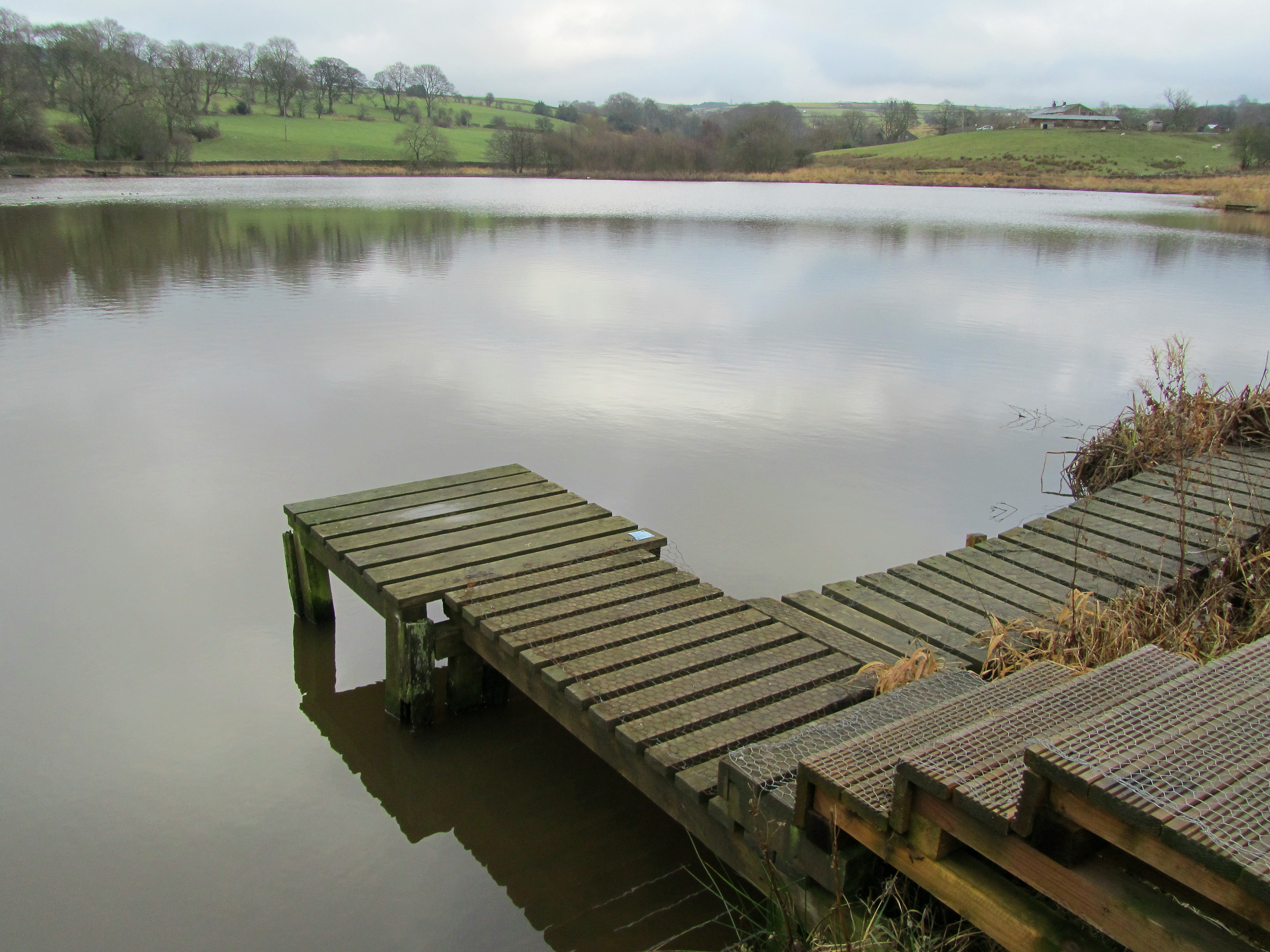
Walverden Reservoir in January 2011.

Walverden Water is a statutory main river in Lancashire, England. It is approximately 2.6 miles (4.2 km) long and has a catchment area of 5.04 square miles (1,304.23 ha). (Note: Measured using mapping website and using the 1890s course where is it no longer visible above ground.)

== Course ==
Beginning at Walverden Reservoir, which is fed by Catlow Brook (from the Coldwell Reservoirs near Boulsworth Hill) and its tributaries, the river heads northwest into the town of Nelson. It flows under Scholefield Mill, where it is presumably still met by Clough Head Beck, (Note: Scholefield Mill now stands at the location of the confluence with Clough Head Beck as recorded in the 1890s.) and continues on through Walverden Park. Shortly afterwards it enters a series of culverts as it passes through the town centre and under the East Lancashire railway line viaduct and the A56 Leeds Road bridge, emerging at Bradley Road and collecting Bradley Syke. It turns to the north and then west and is again culverted, before entering a tunnel under the Leeds and Liverpool Canal and junction 13 of the M65 motorway, emerging next to Nelson and Colne College and shortly after flowing into Pendle Water.

== History ==
The name possibly originates from a contraction of the Old English words wælla (stream) and fyrhþ (frith), (Note: Although the word frith is associated with peace and safety, an earlier meaning of a hunting reserve may be more relevant here as the chases, later royal forest of Pendle and Trawden are located directly west and east. See also:frith) with denu (valley). Water (OE wæter) is a common name for a stream, most often found in southern Scotland.

Walverden Water anciently formed the boundary between the manor of Ightenhill and the manor of Colne, also dividing what was then the township of Marsden in two, with Great Marsden to the northeast and Little Marsden on the southwest side. The lord of Clitheroe had a mill on the river in 1311, thought to have been sited near the confluence with Clough Head Beck, and there is also evidence of an ancient fulling mill close to the reservoir. (Note: A building called Walk Mill, an old name for a fulling mill, still existed in the 1890s, located on the northeast bank next to the reservoir dam.) Duchy of Lancaster records show that Richard Towneley of Towneley Hall was prevented from operating a corn mill called Walveden Mill in 1482 (as was his son John in 1495) as it caused a loss to the king's mills at Burnley and Colne.

The first Ordnance Survey map of the area, published in 1848, shows a corn mill with a pond at what was still the small village of Bradley (today the centre of town). Also a little further north, a sluice appears to feed a mill race to a small pond, across the canal at Hodge Bank, the only cotton mill visible, located next to Reedyford House. (Note: The motorway now runs over the site of both Reedyford House and Hodge Bank Mill.) By the time Nelson developed into a mill town water-power had given way to the steam engine, however these still required a good supply of water. Walverden Mill (built before 1850), Victoria Mill (1857) and Vale Street Shed (1867) were constructed at sites next to the river in the decades that followed.

Although the act that authorised the creation of a compensation reservoir passed in 1866, construction was delayed as all the tenders exceeded the budget of £3196. (Note: Compensation reservoirs regulate the water level of a river, augmenting the flow-rate during dry periods and also reducing the risk of flood.) It was completed by 1869, under the direct management of the local board with a capacity of 250,000 imp gal (1.1 million L). Consequently, several more cotton mills were built along the river, including: Brook Street Mills (by 1884), Bradley Shed (by 1890), Clover Mill (by 1909), Marsden Mill (by 1909), Scholefield Mill (by 1910) and the Valley Mills (first three built between 1895 and 1910, No.4 in 1930). As was the Premier Dye Works, which operated from before 1909 until 1963, with the river also vital for its water supply.

In 2010 United Utilities was fined after a blockage caused sewage to leak into the river through a storm overflow for four days in June, causing "a significant amount of pollution that had a serious impact on water quality". A year-long, Environment Agency led flood-alleviation scheme in the town-centre, completed in 2011, included raising the existing flood walls, the removal of an old weir and sluice and repairs to the walls and culverts with some of the underground sections opened up.
