= Wycoller Beck =

Stream in Lancashire, England

Coordinates: 53.850°N 2.104°W

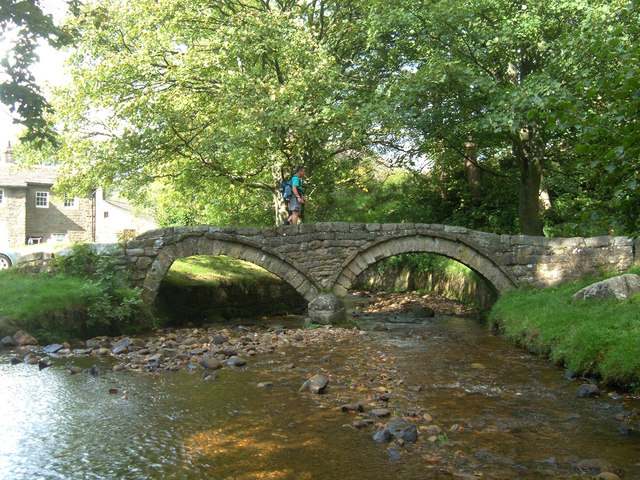

Location
- Countries: United Kingdom

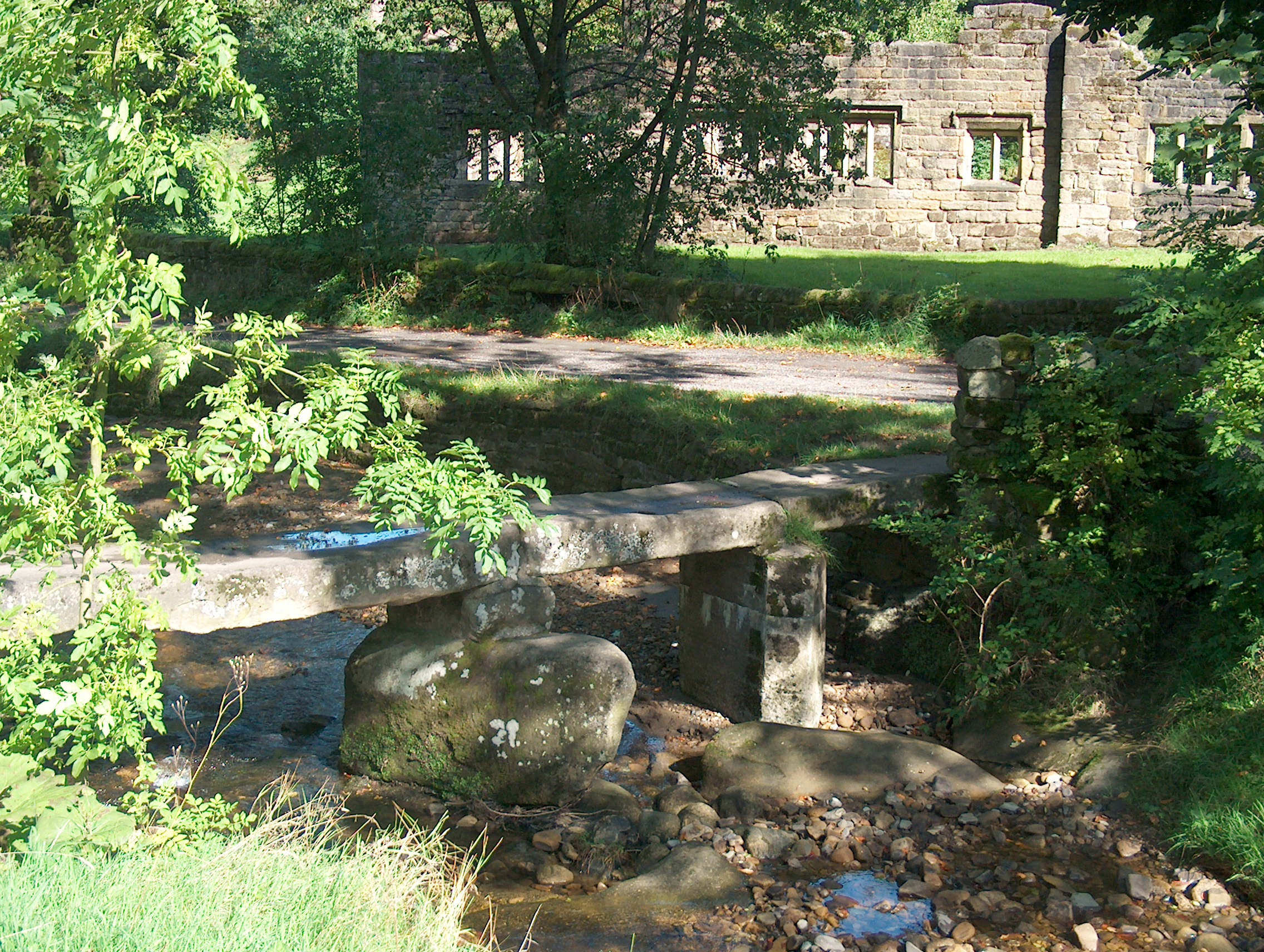
Wycollor Beck passing Wycoller Hall

Wycoller Beck is a stream in Lancashire, running through Wycoller Country Park and the village of Wycoller in Pendle. It is 3.76 miles (6.05 km) long and has a catchment area of 4.04 square miles (10.46 km^{2}).

The river joins the River Laneshaw at Covey Bridge near Laneshaw Bridge to form Colne Water.

Seven bridges cross Wycoller Beck. The Pack-Horse Bridge is probably the most important, being built some 800 years ago and reconstructed over the centuries. Clam Bridge, more than 1000 years old is listed as an Ancient Monument. It was repaired in 1991, after being cracked in two in 1989 and 1990.
