= River Laneshaw =

River in Lancashire, England

Coordinates: 53°51′45″N 2°06′46″W

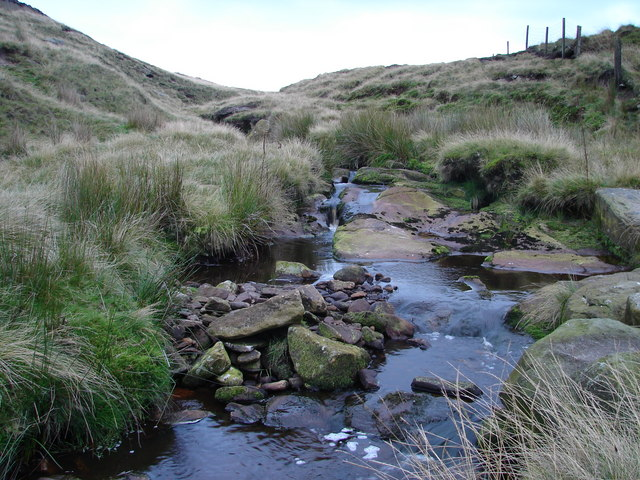
Laneshaw Brook on Emmott Moor

The River Laneshaw is a river in Northern England. It runs for 1.9 miles (3 km) from Laneshaw Reservoir to Laneshaw Bridge alongside the A6068 road and has a catchment area of 5.1 square miles (13.2 km^{2}).

Rising as Laneshaw Brook on Combe Hill between the border of Lancashire and Yorkshire, the brook runs northwards, feeding first Laneshaw Reservoir then running westwards as the River Laneshaw.

The River Laneshaw combines with Wycoller Beck at Covey Bridge to form Colne Water.
