= Colne Water =

River in eastern Lancashire, England

Coordinates: 53°50′51″N 2°12′48″W

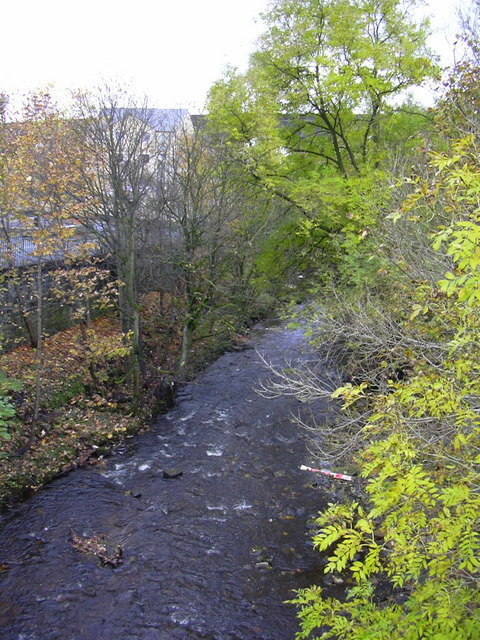
Colne Water from Bridge Street Colne

Colne Water is a river in eastern Lancashire. It is approximately 5.0 miles (7.987 km) long and has a catchment area excluding its major tributaries (the River Laneshaw, Wycoller Beck, Trawden Brook and Wanless Water) of 4.47 square miles (11.584 km^{2}).

Colne Water is formed at the Covey Bridge near Laneshaw Bridge by the confluence of the River Laneshaw and Wycoller Beck. From there, the river runs in a westerly direction toward the town of Colne, collecting Trawden Brook at Cottontree. It continues through Colne's south valley, meeting Church Clough Brook in the Waterside area and passing under the East Lancashire railway line viaduct and the A56 Burnley Road at Primet Bridge. It is joined by Guy Syke at the Greenfield Bridge and passes the town's sewage works as it leaves, shortly afterwards collecting Wanless Water and then Swinden Clough just before it passes under the Leeds and Liverpool Canal. It joins Pendle Water at the Lowerford part of Barrowford, just after the M65 motorway bridge.

The name Colne possibly originates from the ancient British language, but the meaning is uncertain. It is thought that the town takes its name from the river. Water (OE wæter) is a common name for a stream, most often found in southern Scotland.
