= Wolverhampton District Electric Tramways Company =

Tramway operator in England

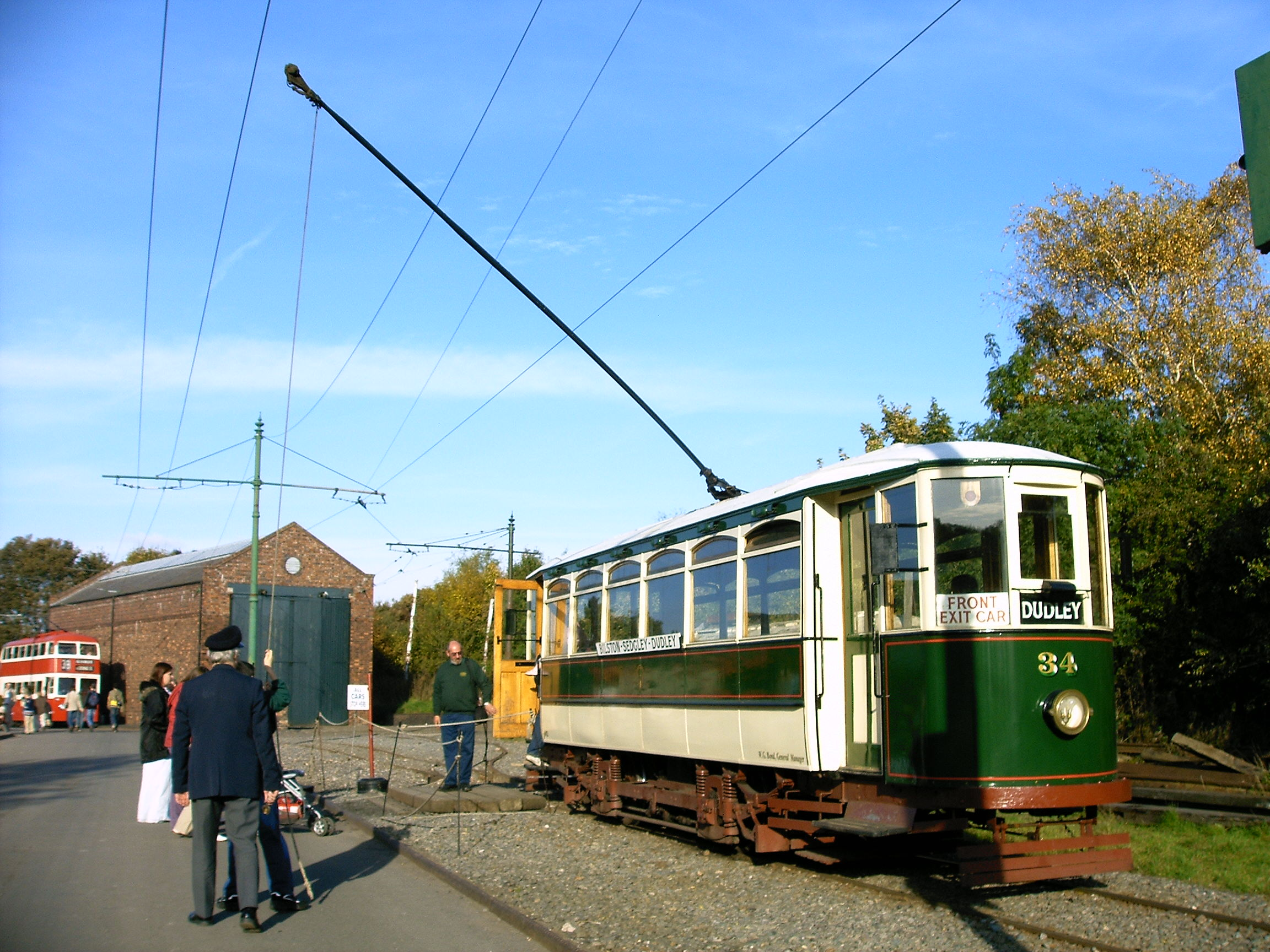
- Car 34 preserved at the Black Country Living Museum

Operation
- Locale: Dudley, Wolverhampton
- Open: 22 April 1899
- Close: 31 August 1928
- Status: Closed

Infrastructure
- Track gauge: 3 ft 6 in (1,067 mm)
- Propulsion system: Electric
- Depots: Mount Pleasant, Bilston

Statistics
- Route length: 14.67 miles (23.61 km)

The Wolverhampton District Electric Tramways Company operated an electric tramway service between Dudley and Wolverhampton between 1899 and 1928.

== History ==
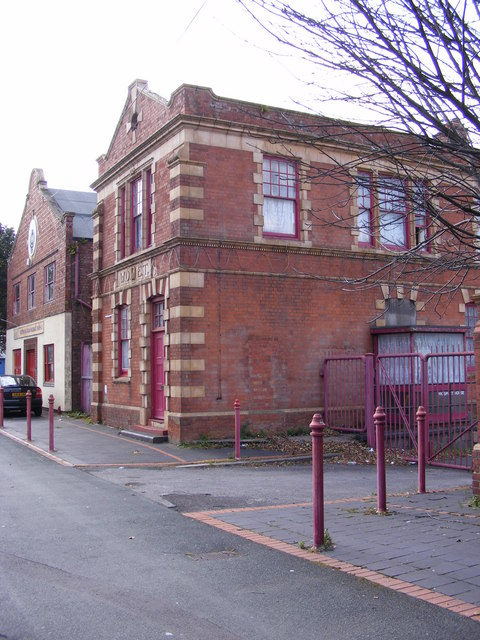
Company offices, a transformer station and the repair and paint shop at 34 Mount Pleasant, Bilston

On 22 April 1899 British Electric Traction purchased the assets of the Dudley and Wolverhampton Tramways Company. The Dudley and Wolverhampton Tramways Order 1899 authorised rebuilding and electrification and the first section between Dudley and Sedgley opened on 3 October 1900, and the remaining section from Sedgley to the Wolverhampton boundary at the Fighting Cocks on 9 January 1902.

The route from Dudley to Sedgley section was worked by tramcars from the Dudley, Stourbridge and District Electric Traction Company. The line between Sedgley and the Fighting Cocks (on the Wolverhampton boundary) remained steam operated until 1902.

On 1 May 1900, the Wolverhampton District Electric Tramways Company purchased the assets of the Bilston and District Tramways from British Electric Traction. The newly electrified line to Dudley was transferred to the new Company, on 1 February 1901.

Electric services began as follows:

- 14 July 1902 Stow Heath Lane to Moxley via Bilston, and the Fighting Cocks to Bilston
- 15 July 1902 Bilston to Willenhall.
- August 1902 Bilston to Bradley
- 6 November 1902 Deans Road to Willenhall
- 6 December 1902 Willenhall to Darlaston
- 15 December 1902 extension to Bull Stake

The offices, a transformer station and the repair and paint shop were based at 34 Mount Pleasant, Bilston.

On 23 April 1903 services started over the South Staffordshire Tramways Company track) from Moxley to Darlaston.

Control of the Dudley to Fighting Cocks section was transferred to the Company on 27 October 1903.

From 1 January 1904, the Birmingham and Midland Tramways Joint Committee took a controlling interest in the company.

On 9 November 1905, the section between Stow Heath Lane and Bilston was taken over by Wolverhampton Corporation Tramways, and the Deans Road to Willenhall section on 18 April 1906. Wolverhampton Corporation Tramways cars were modified with overhead equipment to operate through journeys. Wolverhampton Corporation Tramways used the Lorain Stud contact system on the remainder of their routes.

Wolverhampton District Company cars were modified with Lorain stud contact system equipment and on 15 October 1906 began working between Dudley and Wolverhampton. This was discontinued in 1909 and only restarted in 1921 when the Wolverhampton Corporation Tramways were all converted to overhead power.

The South Staffordshire Tramways Company closed on 1 April 1924, and the company took over services between Darlaston and Wednesbury. Services between Wednesbury and Walsall, and Darlaston and Walsall, were operated jointly with Walsall Corporation Tramways.

== Fleet ==
Services started with 13 double-deck open-top cars from the Electric Railway and Tramway Carriage Works

== Closure ==
Walsall Corporation Tramways took over the section of the system between Willenhall and Darlaston on 1 October 1925, and, on 31 August 1928, the former South Staffordshire routes were transferred to the Dudley, Stourbridge and District Electric Traction Company. Wolverhampton Corporation purchased the rest of the Company assets and the company closed.
