= St James' Church, Altham =

Coordinates: 53.7936°N 2.3480°W

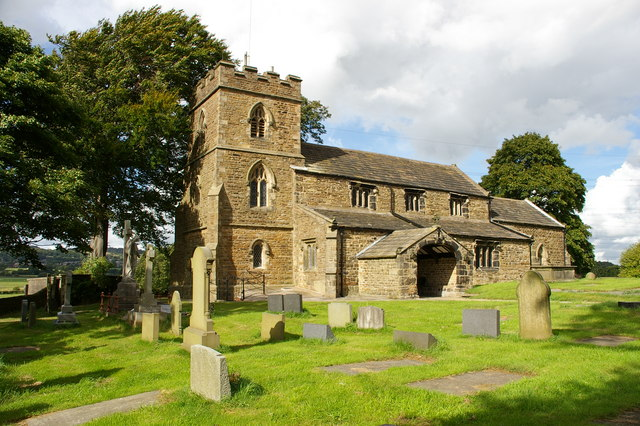
- St James' Church, Altham, from the southwest

- Location in Hyndburn
- OS grid reference: SD 772,331
- Location: Altham, Lancashire
- Country: England
- Denomination: Anglican
- Website: St James, Altham

History
- Status: Parish church

Architecture
- Functional status: Active
- Heritage designation: Grade II*
- Designated: 17 December 1968
- Architect(s): Thomas Hacking (1859 additions and alterations); Paley and Austin (chapel rebuilt)
- Architectural type: Church
- Style: Gothic, Gothic Revival

Specifications
- Materials: Sandstone, stone slate roofs

Administration
- Province: York
- Diocese: Blackburn
- Archdeaconry: Blackburn
- Deanery: Accrington
- Parish: Altham with Clayton le Moors

Clergy
- Vicar: Revd Toby Webber

St James' Church is in the village of Altham, Lancashire, England. It is an active Anglican parish church in the deanery of Accrington, the archdeaconry of Blackburn, and the diocese of Blackburn. Its benefice has been united with that of All Saints, Clayton-le-Moors. The church is recorded in the National Heritage List for England as a designated Grade II* listed building.

== History ==
The church was founded in 1140, and was dedicated to Saint Mary. The earliest fabric in the present church dates from the 15th and 16th centuries. The tower was built in 1859, when the chancel was rebuilt; these and other alterations were made by Thomas Hacking. In 1881 a chapel was rebuilt by the Lancaster architects Paley and Austin.

== Architecture ==
=== Exterior ===
St James' Church is constructed in sandstone rubble, and has a stone slate roof. Its plan consists of a three-bay nave, north and south aisles, a south porch, a two-bay chancel, and a west tower. The tower is short and is in three stages; its architectural style is Perpendicular. It has an arched west doorway with a two-light window above it, two-light bell openings, and a battlemented parapet. All the windows on the sides of the church are round-headed with three lights. The south porch is gabled, and incorporates part of a Norman font in one of its side benches. In 2008 the Norman font was removed from the south porch and is displayed inside the church. The design of the font, comprising eight vertical pallisters, hidden since 1512, but now revealed, opens the suggestion that its origin may be Saxon.

=== Interior ===
Inside the church is a shallow west gallery. The arcades are carried on octagonal piers and have round arches. In the north wall of the chancel is a late-medieval piscina. In its south wall is the re-sited tympanum of a Norman door. The octagonal font was given to the church by the abbot of Whalley Abbey, and contains panels carved with the Instruments of the Passion. The church contains four 19th-century hatchments, and memorial wall tablets dating from the 18th and 19th centuries. It also has box pews dating from 1859. There is a stained glass window in the southeast aisle dating from the middle of the 19th century by Hardman & Co. In the northeast aisle is a window by Shrigley and Hunt dating from the early 20th century. The two-manual organ was built in about 1859 by John Laycock. It has been awarded a Historic Organ Certificate.

== External features ==
The churchyard contains the war graves of three British soldiers of World War I, and a Canadian seaman of World War II.

== See also ==
- Grade II* listed buildings in Lancashire
- Listed buildings in Altham, Lancashire
- List of ecclesiastical works by Paley and Austin
