= Blackburn power stations =

Series of electricity generating stations

Blackburn power station
- Country: United Kingdom
- Location: Blackburn Lancashire
- Coordinates: 53°45′36″N 02°26′54″W
- Status: Decommissioned and demolished
- Construction began: 1891; 1918 (Blackburn East); 2000 (Blackburn Mill)
- Commission date: 1895; 1921 (Blackburn East); 2002 (Blackburn Mill)
- Decommission date: 1946; 1976 (Blackburn East)
- Owners: Blackburn Corporation (1890–1948); British Electricity Authority (1948–1955); Central Electricity Authority (1955–1957); Central Electricity Generating Board (1958–1976); Scottish Power (2002–2019); Drax Power Limited (2019–2021); VPI Holdings Ltd (2021–to date)
- Operator: As owner

Thermal power station
- Primary fuel: Coal (Blackburn and Whitebirk), Natural Gas (Blackburn Mill)
- Cooling towers: 4 (Blackburn and Whitebirk), 2 (Blackburn Mill)
- Cooling source: Circulating water cooling towers,

Power generation
- Units operational: 2 × 2 MW, 1 × 0.75 MW (1923); 1 × 32 MW, 3 × 42 MW (1955); 1 × 43 MW + 1 × 20 MW (2002)
- Make and model: 32 MW and 42 MW English Electric turbo-alternators, 43 MW Siemens SGT800 gas turbine
- Nameplate capacity: 24.78 MW (1923); 143 MW (1955-1972); 60 MW (2002-)
- Annual net output: see table and graph

Blackburn power stations are a series of electricity generating stations that have provided electric power to the town of Blackburn and the wider area from 1895 to the present. The first station in Jubilee Street, Blackburn began operating in 1895. A new larger station known as Blackburn East or Whitebirk power station was commissioned in 1921 and was rebuilt in stages over the period 1942 to 1955. Whitebirk station closed in 1976. The 60 MW Blackburn Mill Combined Cycle Gas Turbine (CCGT) power station has generated electricity since 2002. The Blackburn energy from waste (EfW) plant is currently (2020) being planned.

== History ==
Blackburn Corporation obtained legal powers to provide electric lighting in Blackburn through the Blackburn Electric Lighting Order 1890, confirmed by the Electric Lighting Orders Confirmation (No. 7) Act 1890 (53 & 54 Vict. c. cxcii). A power station was built in Jubilee Street, Blackburn (53°44′46″N 2°28′55″W) on the site of an old gasworks, the power station was formally opened by the Mayor of Blackburn on 18 February 1895. In 1897 the plant had a generating capacity of 675 kW and the maximum load was 277 kW. A total of 241.891 MWh of electricity was sold which powered 15,000 lamps plus 58 public lamps, this provided an income to the corporation of £5,669-18-9d.

Additional plant was added as the demand for electricity increased: by 1923 the plant at Jubilee Street comprised two 2,000 kW steam turbine driven alternators providing 3-phase alternating current at 200 and 400 Volts, and single phase AC at 110 and 220 V. There was also a 775 kW reciprocating engine driven generator supplying 220 and 440 V direct current and a 550 V DC supply for traction current for the Blackburn tram system. The three generating machines/turbines were supplied with steam from coal-fired boilers at up to 75,000 pounds per hour (9.45 kg/s). Smoke from the boilers was dispersed through a 250 ft high chimney, this was demolished in 1925-6.

== Blackburn East / Whitebirk ==
In 1914 the Board of Trade gave consent for the construction of a power station at Whitebirk (53°45′36″N 2°26′51″W) about 3 miles north-east of Blackburn town centre. Construction was delayed by the First World War and the power station was eventually built and was formally opened by Lord Derby on 22 October 1921. The generating plant comprised two 10 MW English Electric Company Limited turbo-alternators supplied with up to 240,000 lb/hr of steam (3.02 kg/s). One of the units ran for 26 years finally being removed from service in early 1948 to allow a bigger unit to replace it.

The boiler house was on the north side of the station, smoke from the boilers was dispersed through four squat chimneys. Adjacent, and to the south, was the machinery house. There were originally four cooling ponds to the south of the station but there were replaced with rectangular wooden cooling towers. Coal was delivered to the station by barge on the adjacent Leeds and Liverpool Canal and by a branch railway.

=== Specification ===
The original 20 MW plant at Whitebirk was replaced from 1942 and new plant was subsequently added in four stages until 1955. The new plant comprised:

- 2 × Simon Carves coal-fired tri-drum boilers each evaporating 150,000 lb/hr (18.9 kg/s) of steam at 630 psi and 875 °F (43.4 bar at 468 °C). These supplied steam to one 32 MW English Electric turbo-alternator, generating at 33 kV. This plant was commissioned in 1942-3.

The original four chimneys were replaced with two taller chimneys on the north side of the boiler house. The rectangular wooden cooling towers were replaced with reinforced hyperbolic towers, in association the above plant there was:

- One Davenport concrete cooling tower with a capacity of 1.8 million gallons per hour (2.27 m^{3}/s). Also commissioned in 1942-3.
- 4 × Simon Carves coal-fired tri-drum boilers each evaporating 150,000 lb/hr (18.9 kg/s) of steam at the above conditions. These supplied steam to one 42 MW English Electric turbo-alternator, generating at 33 kV. This plant was commissioned in 1945-6.
- A second Davenport concrete cooling tower with a capacity of 1.8 million gallons per hour (2.27 m^{3}/s). Also commissioned in 1945-6.
- 3 × Simon Carves boilers each evaporating 150,000 lb/hr of steam at the above conditions. These supplied steam to one 42 MW English Electric turbo-alternator, generating at 33 kV. This plant was commissioned in 1952.
- Another Davenport concrete cooling tower with a capacity of 2.25 million gallons per hour(2.84 m^{3}/s). Commissioned in 1952.
- 3 × Simon Carves boilers each evaporating 150,000 lb/hr of steam also at the above conditions. These supplied steam to one 42 MW English Electric turbo-alternator (33 kV). This plant was commissioned in 1954-5.
- A fourth Davenport concrete cooling tower with a capacity of 2.25 million gallons per hour (2.84 m^{3}/s). Commissioned in 1954-5.

From 1955, when the last of the new plant was operational, the generating capacity of Blackburn Whitebirk power station was 143 MW.

Make up water for the cooling water system was abstracted from the adjacent Leeds and Liverpool Canal.

== Nationalisation ==
Upon nationalisation of the British electricity supply industry on 1 April 1948 the ownership of Blackburn power station was vested in the British Electricity Authority (1948–55), and subsequently the Central Electricity Authority (1955–57) and the Central Electricity Generating Board (CEGB) from 1 January 1958. Upon nationalisation the electricity distribution and sales responsibilities of the Blackburn Corporation electricity undertaking were transferred to the North Western Electricity Board (NORWEB).

== Operations ==
In 1923 the total maximum load on the Blackburn electricity system (including Jubilee Street power station) was 8,792 MW and there was a connected load of 25,939 kW. Sales of electricity amounted to 16.309 GWh generating revenue of £135,792. This gave a surplus of revenue over expenses of £64,020 for Blackburn Corporation. The use of electricity by consumers was as follows.

Blackburn power station consumers, 1923
Consumer	Amount sold (MWh)	Percent
Lighting and Domestic supplies	2,483	15.2
Public lighting	250	1.5
Traction	2,030	12.4
Power including heating	9,458	58.0
Bulk supply to other undertakings	2,088	12.8
Total	16,309	100.0

The operating data for the Blackburn stations over the working life was as follows:

Blackburn power station electricity supply, 1921-1972
Year	Net capability, MW	Electricity supplied, GWh	Running hours (or load factor %)	Thermal efficiency, %
1921	24.78	9.102	(20.1 %)	
1922	24.78	10.24	(21.0 %)	
1923	24.78	16.31	(24.7 %)	
1946		306.339	(39.9 %)	22.18
1954	105	402.768	6627	22.37
1955	143	362.212	6599	22.19
1956	143	435.726	5825	22.52
1957	143	429.917	5667	22.26
1958	143	381.420	5272	22.32
1961	143	338.975	(27.1 %)	22.24
1962	143	426.698	(34.1 %)	21.7
1963	143	440.753	(35.19 %)	20.96
1967	143	355.624	(28.4 %)	21.32
1972	143	184.239	(14.7 %)	19.97

Electricity supplied, in GWh

In 1958 the Blackburn electricity district supplied an area of 83 square miles and a population of 236,400. The amount of electricity sold and the number and types of consumers was as follows:

Year	Electricity sold, MWh	No. of consumers
1956	349,486	84,618
1957	356,657	86,005
1958	383,267	87,133

In 1958 the above totals were made up of the following:

Type of Consumer	No. of consumers	Electricity sold, MWh
Domestic	75,152	101,964
Commercial	6,347	32,602
Combined premises	3,723	12,474
Farms	839	5,829
Industrial	1,053	225,751
Public lighting	19	4,647
Total	87,133	383,267

The Blackburn Whitebirk power station was closed by the CEGB on 26 October 1976. The cooling towers were demolished in May 1982.

In 1984 planning permission was given for the redevelopment of the site as a retail and leisure park, currently known as Hyndburn Retail Park.

== Blackburn Mill ==
In 2002 Scottish Power commissioned a 60 MW combined heat and power (CHP) plant in association with the adjacent Sappi paper mill. This plant is located south of Feniscowes (53°43'05"N 2°32'16"W) about 3 miles south-west of Blackburn. The plant comprises a 43 MW Siemens SGT800 gas turbine and power turbine coupled to an alternator. The gas turbine is fuelled by natural gas delivered via a 4.6 km pipeline from the National Transmission System. An Alstom ENS heat recovery boiler generates steam from the waste heat in the turbine exhaust, the steam is used to drive a 20 MW steam turbine and a second electricity generator. Exhaust gases are disposed of through a 50 metre high chimney. Electricity (10 MW) and exhaust steam (28 tonnes per hour) was sent to the paper mill for use in the paper-making process. Electricity is exported to the National Grid via an 11kV/132kV transformer. Surplus steam is condensed in a water-cooled condenser and heat is dissipated through Balche Duerr hybrid cooling towers.

In 2008 the Sappi paper mill closed and Blackburn Mill became a Combined Cycle Gas Turbine (CCGT) station, with a rating of 60 MW. In 2009 the station delivered 382 GWh and in 2010 378 GWh. In 2010 the station operated 143 two-shifts, operating when electricity prices were high. It was sold to Drax Generation Enterprise Ltd in January 2019, who operated it until the power station was sold in February 2021 to Vitol (VPI Holdings Ltd)

== Blackburn Energy from Waste plant ==
In August 2019 Blackburn with Darwen Borough Council approved the development by Suez UK of an Energy from Waste plant on Lower Eccleshill Road in Darwen. The plant would be capable of processing 500,000 tonnes per of domestic and commercial waste. It will export up to 44.5 MW of electricity to the national grid. Construction work was expected to begin in 2021 and the plant could be operational by 2023.

== See also ==
- Blackburn Corporation Tramways
- Blackburn Meadows power station (located in Sheffield)
