= HMS Altham =

Minesweeper of the Royal Navy

History

United Kingdom
- Name: HMS Altham
- Namesake: Altham, Lancashire
- Builder: Camper and Nicholsons
- Launched: 2 December 1952
- Completed: 8 July 1953
- Commissioned: 13 July 1953
- Fate: Transferred to Malaysia 1 April 1959.
- Notes: Pennant number(s): M2602 / IMS02

Malaysia
- Name: KD Sri Johor
- Acquired: 1 April 1959
- Fate: Broken up 1967.

General characteristics
- Class & type: Ham-class minesweeper
- Displacement: 120 long tons (122 t) standard; 159 long tons (162 t) full load
- Length: 100 ft (30 m) p/p; 106 ft 6 in (32.46 m) o/a
- Beam: 21 ft (6.4 m)
- Draught: 5 ft 6 in (1.68 m)
- Propulsion: 2 shaft Paxman diesels; 1,100 bhp (820 kW)
- Speed: 14 knots (16 mph; 26 km/h)
- Complement: 14
- Armament: 1 × Oerlikon 20 mm cannon

HMS Altham was one of 93 ships of the Ham class of inshore minesweepers.

Their names were all chosen from villages ending in -ham. The minesweeper was named after Altham in Lancashire.

Altham (pennant number M2602) was a member of the first series of Ham-class minesweepers, with composite wood and aluminium construction. It was built by Camper and Nicholsons of Gosport, completing on 8 July 1953.

The ship commissioned at Hythe, Hampshire on 13 July 1953, serving with the 232nd Mine Sweeper Squadron at Harwich in Essex from 1954 to 1956, going into reserve at Rosneath on the Gare Loch in northwest Scotland in 1957.

Altham was transferred to the Royal Malayan Navy on 1 April 1958, being renamed Sri Johor. Sri Johor had its minesweeping gear removed and replaced by two more 20 mm Oerlikon cannon and four 2-pounder saluting guns, although the minesweeping gear was later re-fitted. Sri Johor was broken up in 1967.
