= Darwen Corporation Tramways =

Tramway operator in England

Operation
- Locale: Darwen
- Open: 1 January 1899
- Close: 5 October 1946
- Status: Closed

Infrastructure
- Track gauge: 4 ft (1,219 mm)
- Propulsion system: Electric

Statistics
- Route length: 4.36 miles (7.02 km)

Darwen Corporation Tramways operated a tramway service in Darwen between 1899 and 8 October 1946.

== History ==
The corporation took over the services operated by the Blackburn and Over Darwen Tramways Company within its boundary on 1 January 1899. Under the leadership of Mr Robert William Smith-Saville (general manager of the Tramways Department) a programme of modernisation and electrification was proposed, but in the meantime between January 1899 to October 1900 the old steam trams continued to run services between Darwen and Blackburn operated by Blackburn Corporation Tramways under an agreement with Darwen Corporation.

On 31 August 1900 Smith-Saville appointed Mr William Grant (of Blackpool) as tramway foreman and the first electric service between Darwen and Blackburn ran on 16 October 1900. Through services were operated into Blackburn under an agreement with Blackburn Corporation Tramways.

On 12 October 1901 a further extension of the tramway system opened between Darwen and Hoddlesden. William Grant departed to Rotherham Corporation Transport in early 1903 and was replaced on 9 February 1903 by Mr Frederick J. S. Hosken (of Taunton), who on 23 December 1912 was promoted to tramways manager on a wage of "£200 per annum - without house".

On 2 June 1915 Smith-Saville, who Hosken had replaced as general manager, died aged 48.

On 25 March 1918 Hosken's resignation was accepted after he was asked to work for the Ministry of Munitions and the management post was advertised on a wage of £250 per annum.

On 6 May 1918 Mr George A. Newsome (of Dumbarton) was appointed the new tramway manager. Newsome kept the post for over 20 years until 22 December 1938 when he was dismissed (with three months' salary) for misconduct in office.

On 24 April 1939 Mr Lee Wilkes was appointed acting general manager. Later that year (13 September 1939) he became general manager and chief engineer and remained in post until he departed in April 1945 to become general manager at Chester Passenger Transport.

On 1 June 1945 Mr George Beckett – who had been traffic superintendent at Stockport Transport – was appointed the new general manager and he saw out the last days of Darwen Trams in October 1946 and remained in post at Darwen Corporation Transport until he died in July 1961.

== Closure ==
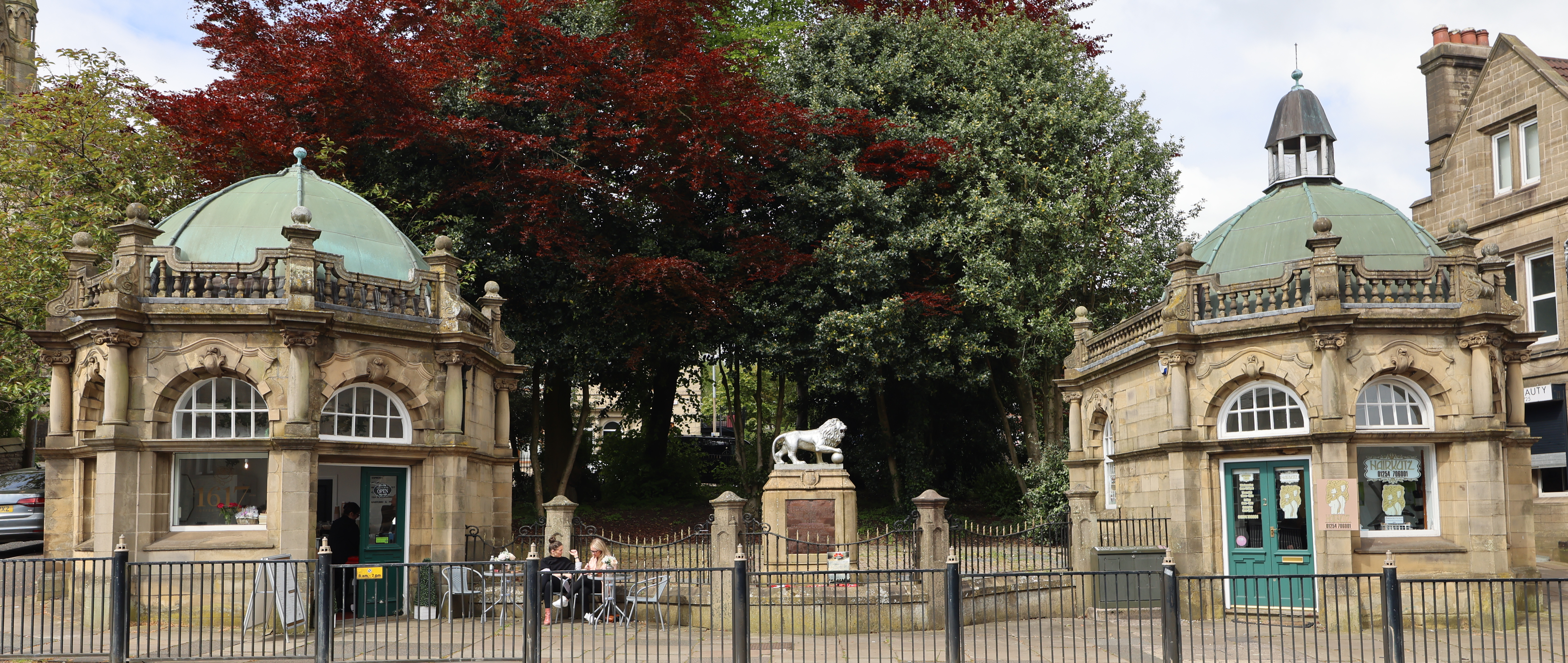
The tram shelter at Darwen

Services ended on 5 October 1946.
