= A678 road =

Road in Lancashire, England

Coordinates: 53.77908°N 2.36974°W

A678

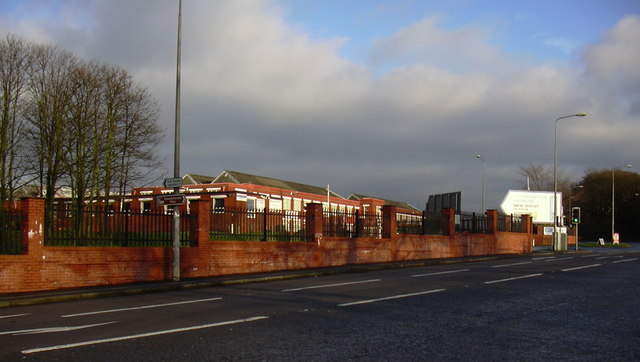
- Blackburn Road passing an industrial estate in Clayton-le-Moors

Major junctions
- West end: Blackburn
- A679 A6119 M65 A680 A6068 A671
- East end: Padiham

Location
- Country: United Kingdom
- Constituent country: England

Road network
- Roads in the United Kingdom; Motorways; A and B road zones

The A678 is a road in Lancashire, England, which runs between the towns of Blackburn and Padiham.

The road was formerly the main route between Blackburn and Burnley before it was bypassed by the M65 motorway which opened in the 1980s. It currently runs between the A6078 Blackburn Town Centre Orbital Route and the A671 in Padiham, via the small towns of Rishton and Clayton-le-Moors, having been extended at the Blackburn end when the A677 was renumbered east of Blackburn. Within Blackburn the road is a primary route. It forms the main route for traffic arriving in Blackburn from other towns in East Lancashire and West Yorkshire, as it connects the town centre with the M65 junction 6 at Whitebirk. The Red Lion roundabout at Whitebirk, where the A678 joins the A6119, with slip roads to the M65, had become prone to traffic congestion since the M65 was extended in 1997, and was recently upgraded with the addition of traffic lights.

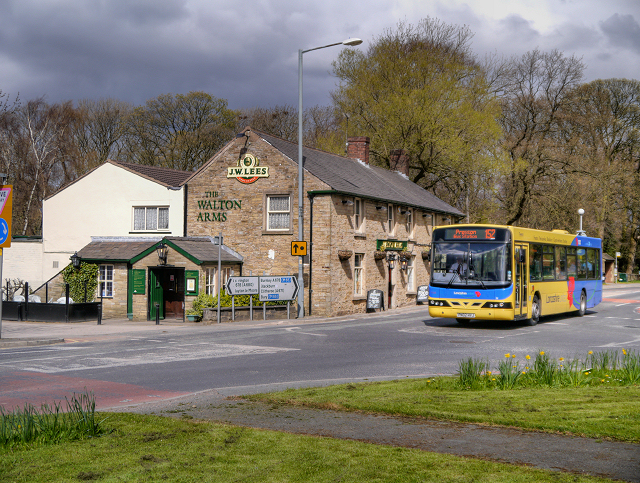
A678 passing the Walton Arms at Altham

The A678 is the main road through Rishton and is called Blackburn Road, High Street and Hermitage Street. It crosses the A680 at a set of traffic lights in Clayton-le-Moors and then passes through Altham before it reaches the A6068, and then the A671 in Padiham. Although most of the road between Whitebirk and Padiham is bypassed by the M65 and is no longer a primary route it is considered by Hyndburn Borough Council to be one of the district's primary roads according to its Local Plan. and provides access to industrial estates in Altham.
