= Thomas Green & Son =

UK company

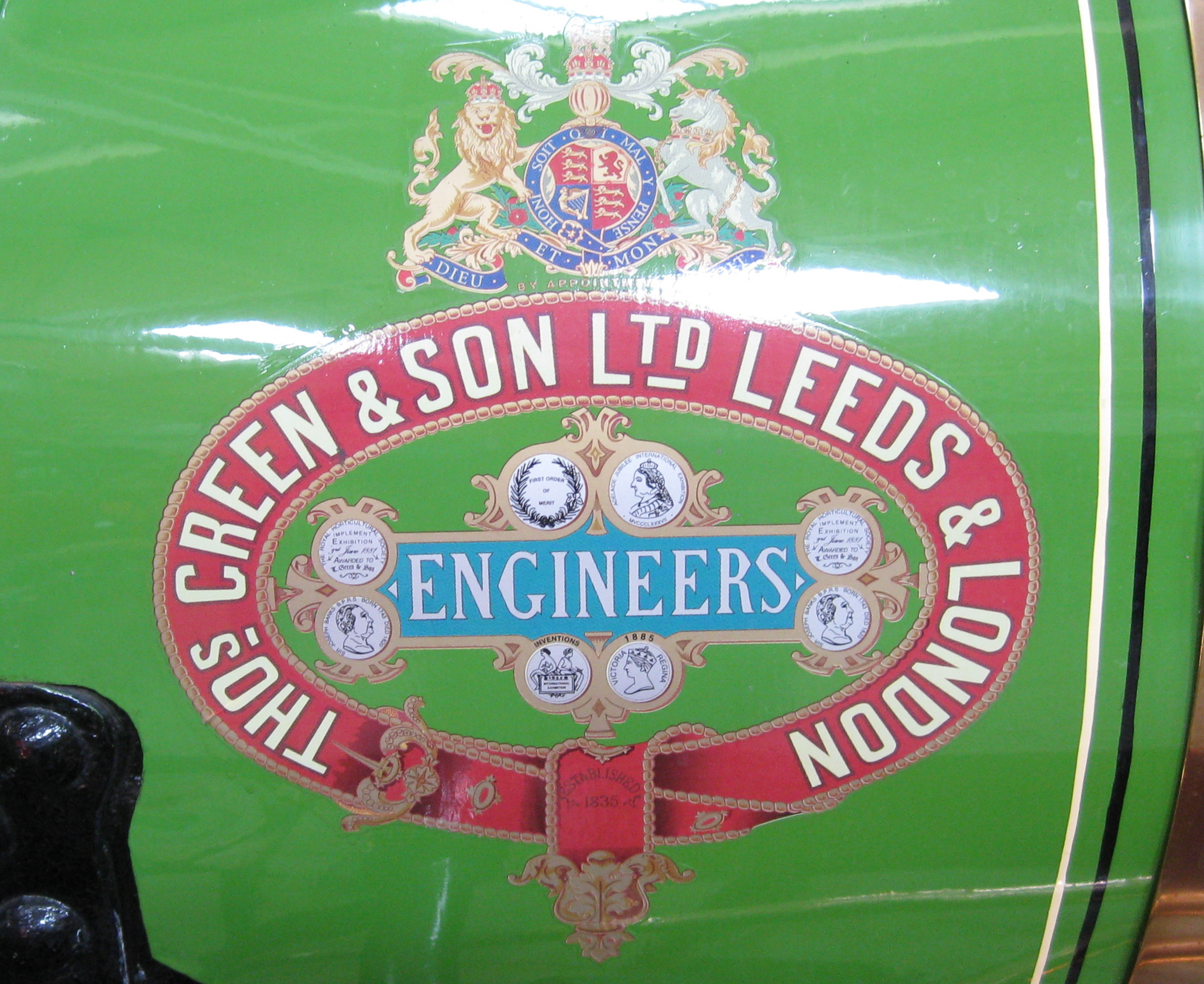
Company Coat of Arms

Thomas Green & Son, Ltd. were engineers who manufactured a wide range of products at the Smithfield Foundry, Leeds, United Kingdom

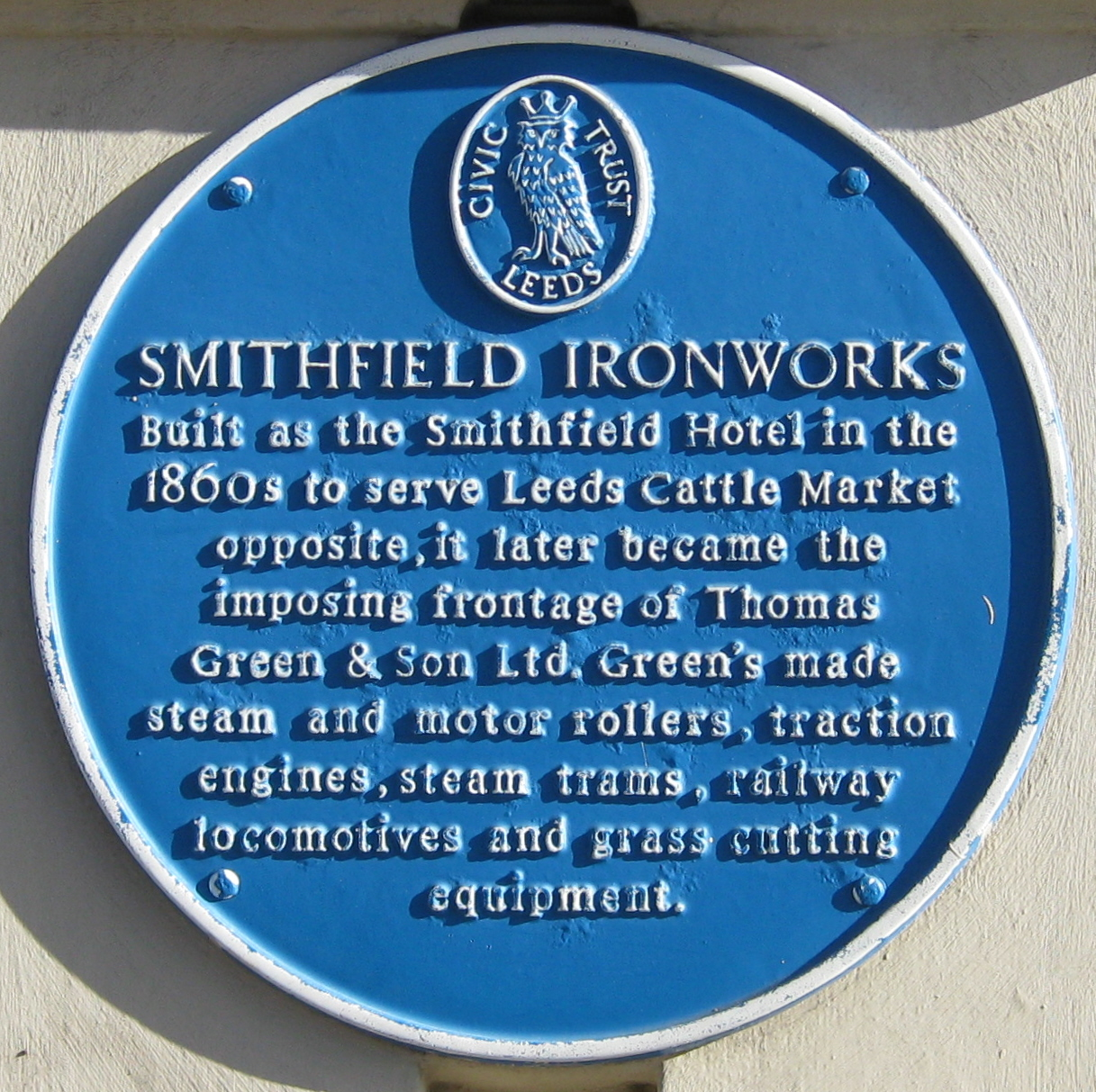
Smithfield Ironworks blue plaque

== Introduction ==
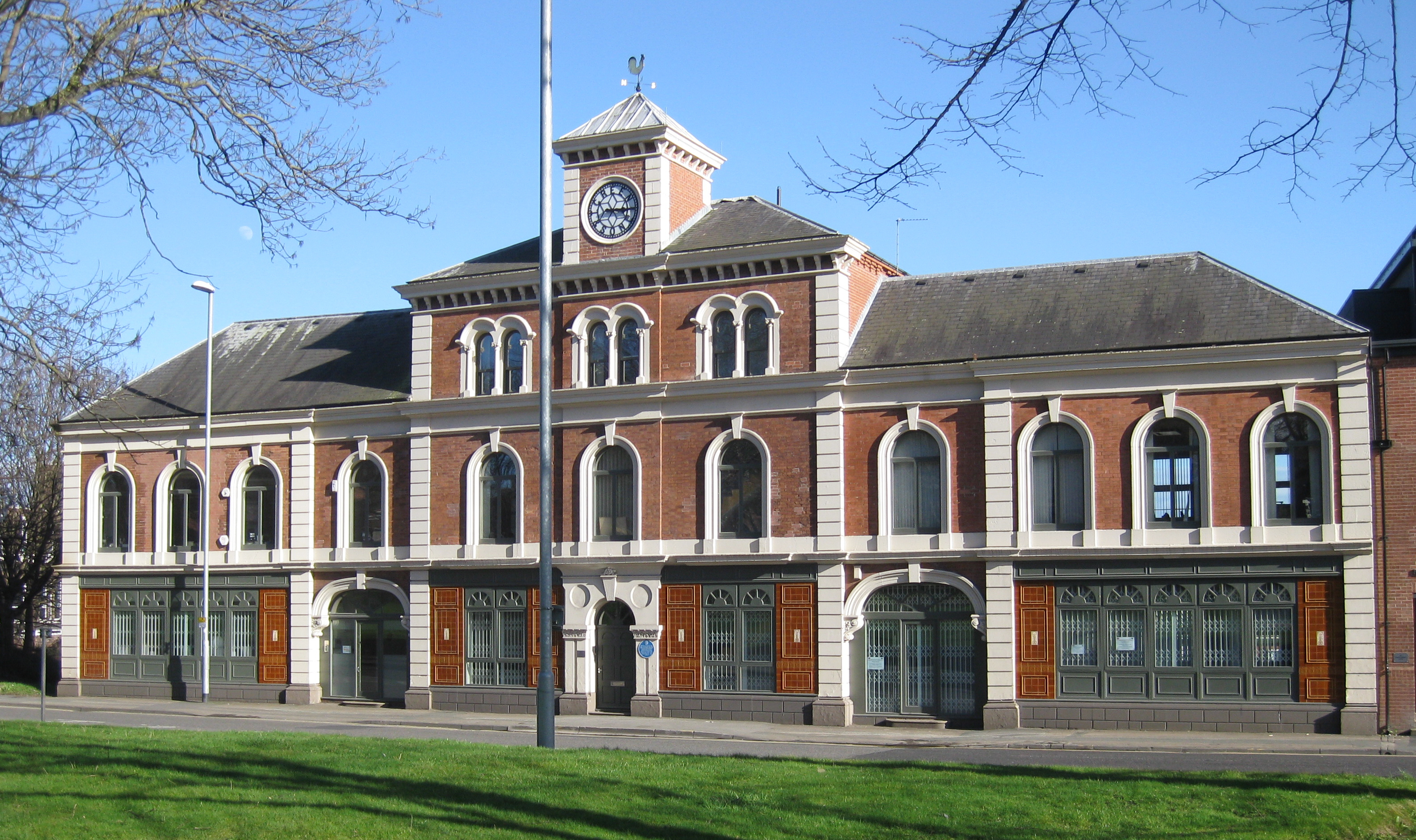
Former offices on North Street: the clock has "T Green & Son" instead of numbers

Thomas Green came to Leeds from Carlton-on-Trent near Newark and founded the company in 1835. The company was originally located at 34 Lower Head Row (now Eastgate), Leeds, and specialised in all types of wirework, including wire weaving and galvanising. The Smithfield Foundry site in North Street was purchased in 1848 and the first buildings were erected in 1850. In 1900 they took over the former Smithfield Hotel which became the front entrance and offices. In 1863 a London office was opened, principally to serve the overseas trade. This was followed in 1881 by the opening of the "Surrey Works" in Blackfriars, London. Improvements in trade led to the opening of the "New Surrey Works" in 1902.

== Products ==
=== Lawnmowers ===
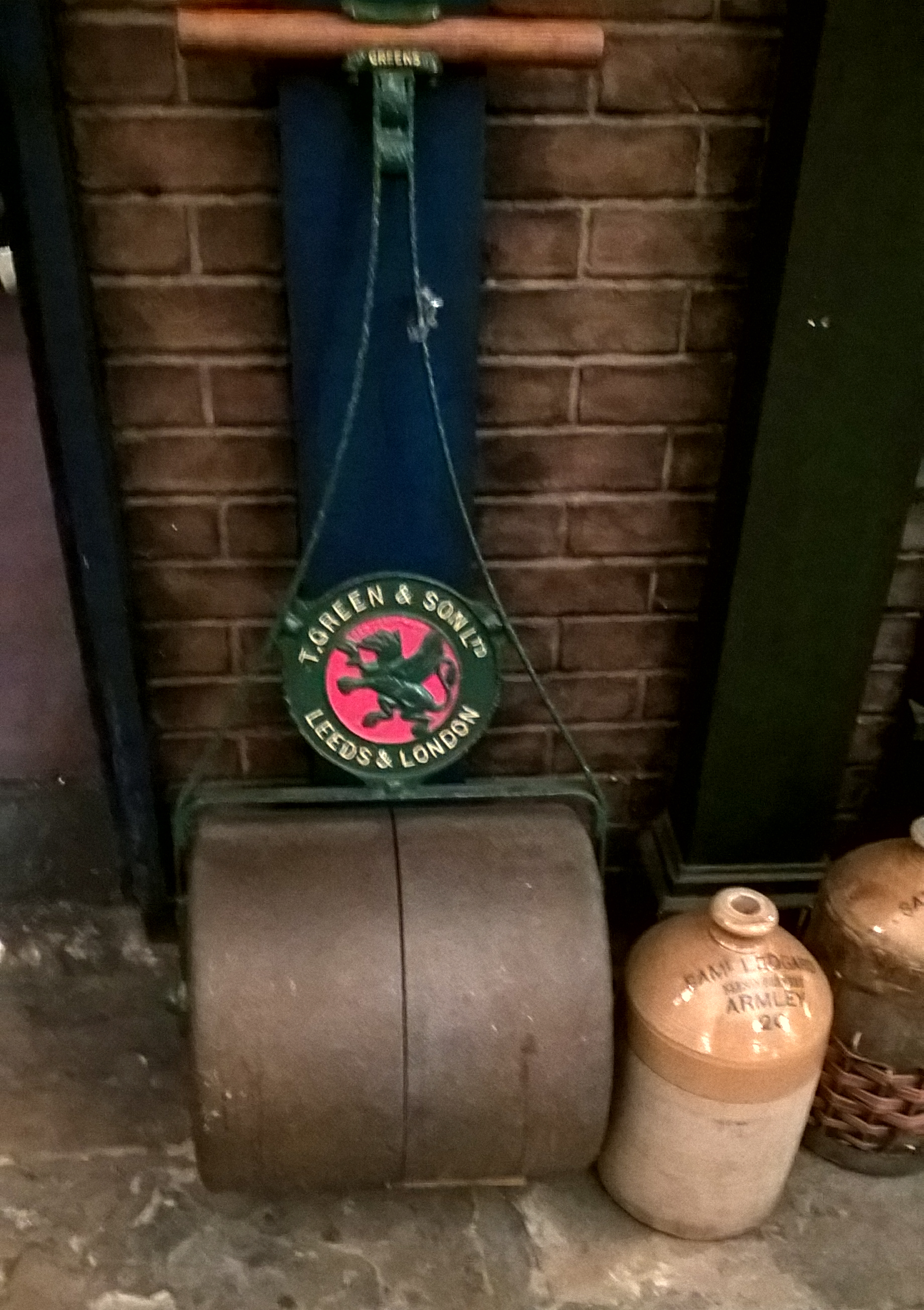
Garden roller at Abbey House Museum

One of the products that Greens are most known for, the lawnmower, was first constructed in 1855. The earliest lawn mower was patented by E. B. Budding of Stroud, Gloucestershire in 1830. Green improved the Budding design by adding a rake to lift the grass and reducing its weight. In 1858 Greens machine won first prize at the first lawn mower trial conducted at the London Horticultural Gardens, Chiswick. A short-lived product, introduced in 1902, was the steam-powered lawnmower, targeted at groundsmen. Greens produced mowers in a wide range of sizes from 8in to 42in and these were given grand names, such as Silens Messor (Britain's first chain driven mower) and Multum in Parvo (with little, much), and along with Ransomes of Ipswich and Shanks of Arbroath, dominated the market until the First World War.

=== Tram engines ===
One of the products that Greens became well known for was steam tram engines. The use of steam tramways in Britain was effectively prohibited by the draconian rules contained in the so-called Red Flag Act or more correctly the Locomotive Acts of 1861 and 1865. The introduction of new regulations, the Highways and Locomotives (Amendment) Act 1878 (41 & 42 Vict. c. 77) set out a more workable arrangement as follows:

- Engine to be governed to prevent speeds in excess of 10 miles per hour
- No steam or smoke to be emitted
- Be free from noise produced by blast or clatter
- The machinery to be concealed from view at all points above 4 inch from rail level

Thomas Green commenced building tramway locomotives in 1885. These locomotives were initially of the Wilkinson's patent, built under licence. This design used a vertical boiler and a vertically mounted engine which drove one set of wheels through gears. The second pair of wheels was driven through coupling rods. The exhaust passed through a chamber in the firebox to provide reheat, which in principle would make the steam invisible. The speed governor was an "Allen" paddle type which acted on the reversing gear.

Thirty-nine Wilkinson type trams were delivered before Green's developed their own design using a horizontal boiler, inclined cylinders and Joy valve gear. The machine quickly evolved such that Green's tram engines became one of the market leaders.

==== Customers ====
Some of Green's customers for steam tram engines were:

- Accrington Corporation Steam Tramways Company
- Birmingham & Midland Tramways Ltd.
- Blackburn and Over Darwen Tramways Company
- Blackburn Corporation Tramways Ltd.
- Bradford Tramways & Omnibus Company Ltd.
- Bradford & Shelf Tramways Company Ltd.
- Coventry & District Tramways Company
- Drypool & Marfleet Steam Tramways Company (Hull)
- Dublin and Lucan Steam Tramway Company
- Dundee and District Tramways
- Huddersfield Corporation Tramways
- Leeds Tramways Company
- Manchester, Bury, Rochdale & Oldham Steam Tramway Company
- North Shields & Tynemouth District Tramways Ltd.
- Rossendale Valley Tramways Company
- St. Helens & District Tramways Company Ltd.
- South Staffordshire and Birmingham District Steam Tramways Company
- Wolverton and Stony Stratford Tramway

Others were despatched to Penang and Kimberley. According to Whitcombe, 157 were built, the last in 1898 for Kimberley, South Africa.

In a letter written in 1936 by Mr C.V.Clark of Thomas Green, he explains how the tram locomotives were constructed and transported. “Do you remember me shewing you the engine shop down that back street? Well, the engine boiler, motion and wheels were put together on the ground floor. The body of mild steel-plate was completed on the top floor of the building, say 50 feet or more up, Then two large trap-doors were opened, and the job was lowered onto the business end of the affair and it only remained to be bolted to the frames and get steamed up. If Leeds were taking delivery, a lot of flat plates were laid down the street during the night, and by brute force and cuss words the engine was run up under its own steam, then slewed round and dropped in the tram-lines.”

=== Railway locomotives ===
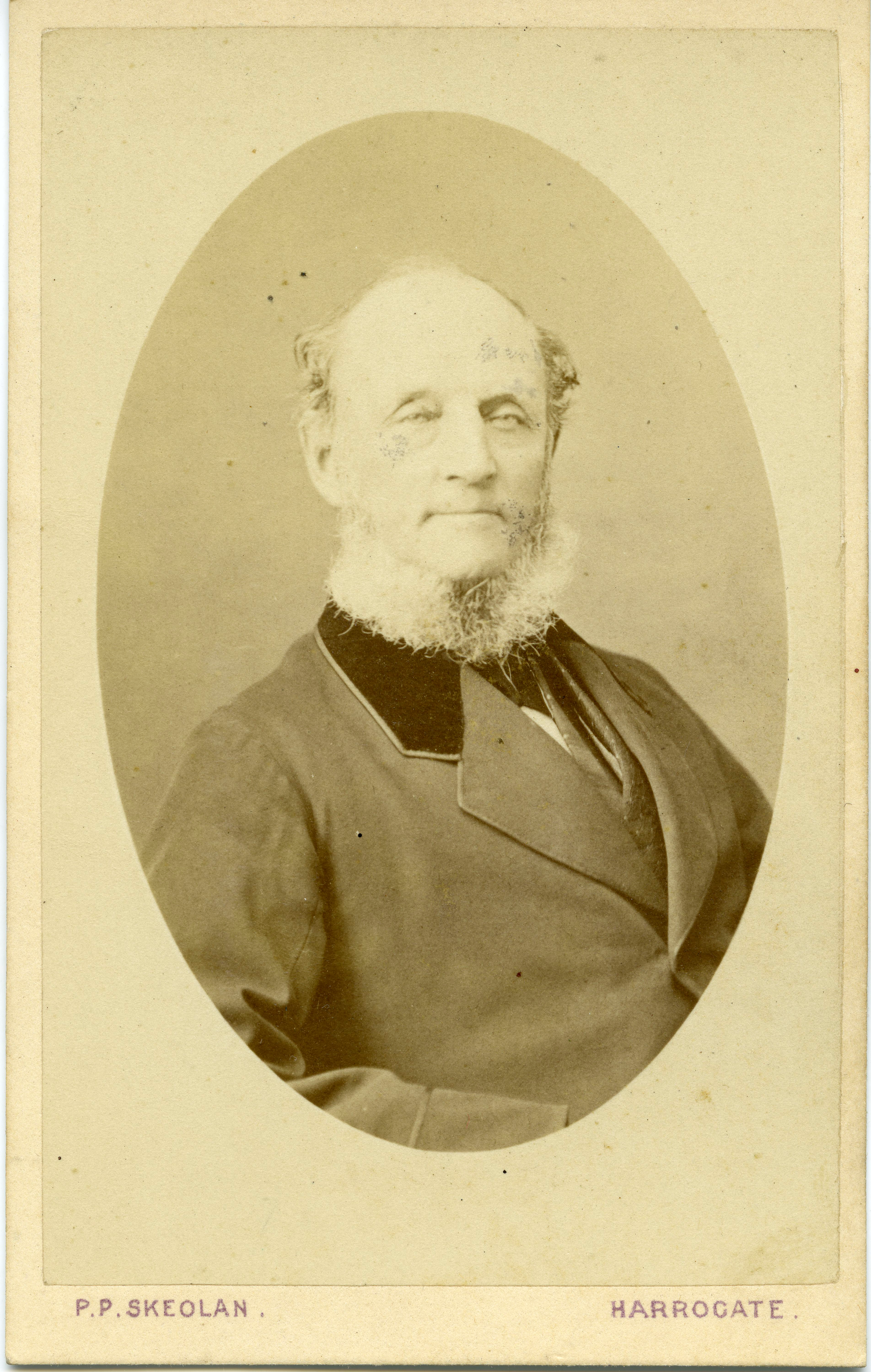
Thomas Green

The first conventional locomotive, an 0-4-0WT, was built in 1888 for Australia. Subsequently, nearly forty locomotives were built of side or saddle tank arrangement. Two were exported in 1908 through Robert Hudson. In the period 1902 to 1904, three were bought for the construction of the Colsterdale Reservoir for Harrogate Corporation. These were Harrogate and Claro both 0-4-2STs and Masham an 0-6-2ST. A similar 0-6-2ST locomotive Barber was delivered to the Harrogate Gasworks Railway. Three locomotives complete with circular railways were constructed in 1895 for fairgrounds. Eight locomotives were sent to Ireland, three 2-6-2 side tanks to the West Clare Railway, three to the Dublin & Blessington and two 0-4-4STs to the Cork & Muskerry Railway. In 1897, two 0-4-0STs are recorded as being delivered to the Lima Railway, Peru. In 1920, the last locomotive of a series of nine was exported to Societe Generale de Paris, France.

Barber has survived and after many years in storage at Armley Mills Museum in Leeds and an unsuccessful attempt to overhaul it, this locomotive is now owned by the South Tynedale Railway, Alston, Cumbria. Due to the extensive nature of the overhaul that was required, it is now expected that this will be completed early in 2014 and the locomotive returned to steam for the first time since the 1940s. During 2014, there will be a special gala when Barber and Harrogate will be seen together in steam. The full overhaul has been made possible by private donations and grants from public bodies. It will haul passenger trains on the South Tynedale from Alston, across the Northumberland – Cumbria border, first to Lintley Halt and later, when the line is reopened about 2016, to the village of Slaggyford.

=== Road Rollers ===
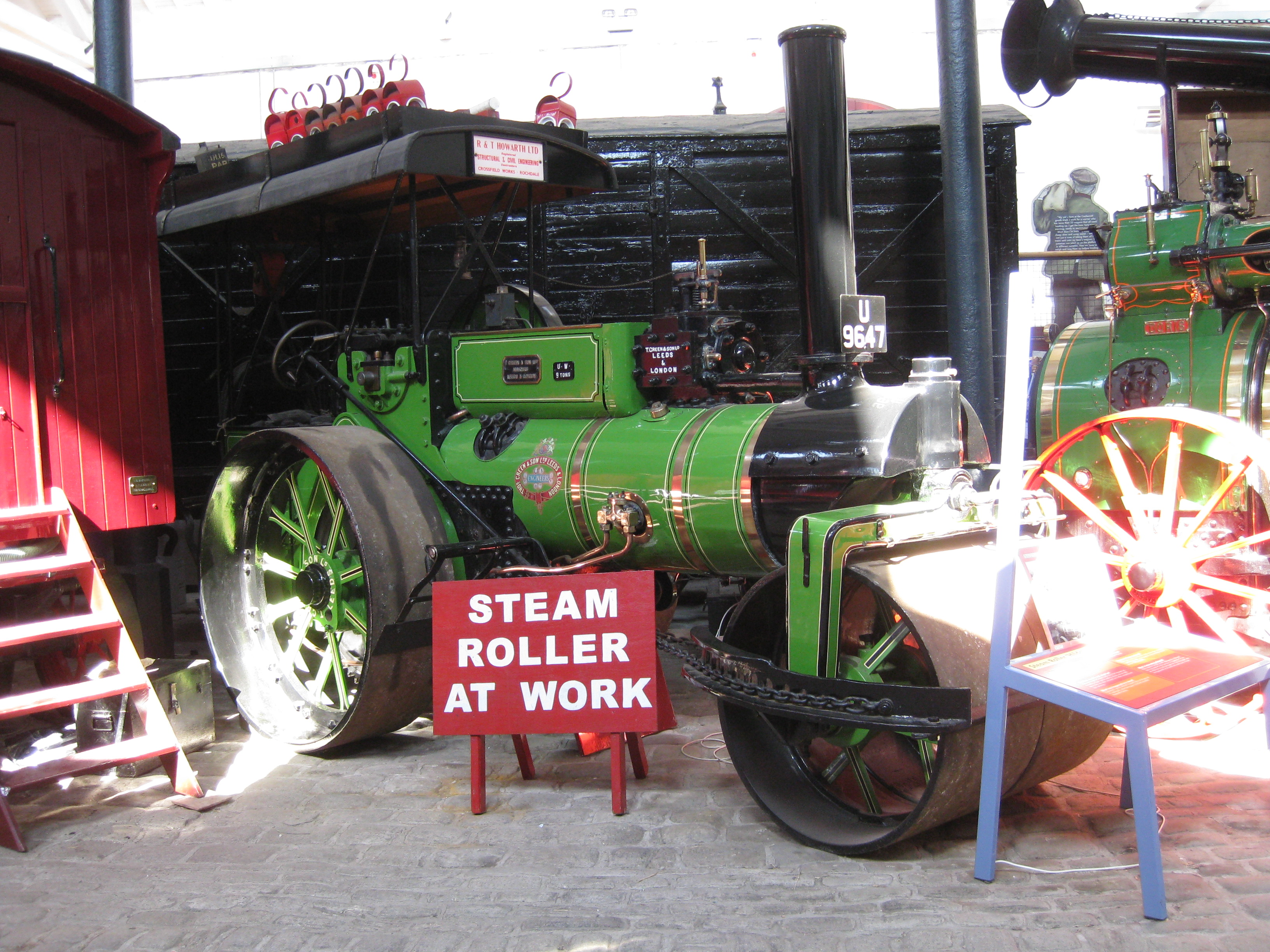
T. Green Steam Roller at Bury Transport Museum

Thomas Green also produced a range of steam road vehicles including fairground centre-engines, road tractors and agricultural tractors. Perhaps their most well known product in this range was the steamroller, which commenced in 1872 with a vertical boilered model for the Royal Gardens, Windsor. Shortly afterward, in 1880, a convertible model (i.e. traction engine or road roller) was introduced. A conventional horizontal boilered model followed this in 1881. The range was developed to encompass the whole range of weights (3 ton to 12 ton) and styles (tandem roller, triple roller) which enabled them to become one of the market leaders, with around 300 machines supplied.

With an eye on sports grounds, Greens introduced the first of a range of petrol engined rollers in 1905. The diesel engined DRM model in the 1930s, and lighter versions, the DRL and DRX, superseded these. In the 1960s, the "Workman" was designed together with a heavier model, the "Pacemaker."

=== Other products ===
Many other types of products were produced, including gas and petrol engines, boilers, food-preparing machinery, stable furnishings, garden furniture, ornamental gates and railings. There are still public houses in Leeds with Thomas Green cast iron tables. Whitelock's in Turk's Head Yard, and the Cardigan Arms on Kirkstall Road both have T. Green & Son cast iron tables. The firm also made about 50 portable electric lighting sets between 1895 and 1901 chiefly for showmen. The info we have (Edward & Anne Silcock collection). they made about 45 (Portable Steam Electric Light Engines) and was from about 1892 and 1902 mostly for travelling Showmen.

== Later history ==
During the First World War the works continued to produce road rollers alongside the inevitable military products such as Mine Sinkers, Lathes, Bombs, Mortar Shells, Artillery wheels. The manager during this period was George W Blackburn whose son Robert Blackburn founded the Blackburn Aeroplane Company. Indeed, some of Roberts's early efforts were constructed at Smithfield foundry.

After the First World War the lawnmower trade was developed by fitting a "Young" two-stroke engine to their hand machines. The engine was changed in 1922 to the "Dalman" and so successful was this combination that in 1923, Greens took on the manufacture of these engines. The introduction of engine manufacture inevitably led to further engine designs being developed to match the range of mowers being produced. Subsequently, gang mowers for cricket pitches and playing fields became one of the main products, indeed such famous grounds as Headingley and Trent Bridge used Greens equipment.

Manufacturing during the Second World War consisted primarily of parts for Blackburn Aircraft and in 1951 this company took control of the business. With amalgamations in the aircraft industry, Hawker Siddeley took over the business in 1960, but this was not a successful marriage and in 1975 Greens were sold to Atkinsons of Clitheroe and the Leeds works closed.

== Preservation ==
- No. 132, built to 3 ft 6 in (1,067 mm) gauge in 1888, which is an 0-4-0WT locomotive, preserved by Margaret River Rotary Club, in Western Australia.
- No. 219, built to 2 ft (610 mm) gauge in 1895, which is an 0-4-2ST locomotive, preserved by Graeme Harding, in Victoria
- No. 441, Barber, 0-6-2ST, built 1908, preserved at South Tynedale Railway
- Three Thomas Green & Son Steam Rollers exist in the UK, Only one is known to be in working order.
- About 60 greens motor rollers are known to still exist, and examples can be seen at vintage vehicle rallies and steam rallies around the country.

== See also ==
- Aveling-Barford
- History of rail transport in Ireland
