= South Staffordshire Tramways Company =

Tramway operator in England

Operation
- Locale: Wednesbury
- Open: 15 July 1883
- Close: 1 April 1924
- Status: Closed

Infrastructure
- Track gauge: 3 ft 6 in (1,067 mm)
- Propulsion system: Steam then Electric

Statistics
- Route length: 23.07 miles (37.13 km)

The South Staffordshire and Birmingham District Steam Tramways Company which became the South Staffordshire Tramways Company operated a tramway service from their depot in Wednesbury between 1883 and 1924.

== South Staffordshire and Birmingham District Steam Tramways Company ==
The Staffordshire Tramways Order 1879 authorised the construction of the steam tramway which was operated by the South Staffordshire and Birmingham District Steam Tramways Company. The company depot was at Kings Hill, Wednesbury.

Routes and start dates were as follows:

- 16 July 1883 New Inns Handsworth and Darlaston, via West Bromwich and Wednesbury.
- 14 January 1884 Carter's Green West Bromwich to Great Bridge
- 21 January 1884 Wednesbury to Dudley, via Tipton
- 21 January 1884 Darlaston to Moxey
- 4 December 1884 Wednesbury to Bloxwich, via Pleck and Walsall,
- 4 December 1884 Darlaston to Pleck,
- 4 December 1884 an extension from Walsall to Mellish Road
- 12 October 1885 Great Bridge to Dudley
- 21 November 1885 an extension at Bloxwich

=== Fleet ===
- 1-2 Wilkinson 1883
- 3-12 Beyer, Peacock and Company 1883
- 13-16 Thomas Green & Son 1883
- 17-21 Wilkinson 1883
- 22-29 Beyer, Peacock and Company 1884
- 30-37 Thomas Green & Son 1884
- 38 Falcon Engine & Car Works 1885 (second-hand from Hartlepool Steam Tramway)

In addition there were 12 passenger trailer vehicles from the Starbuck Car and Wagon Company and 22 from Falcon Engine & Car Works.

== South Staffordshire Tramways Company ==
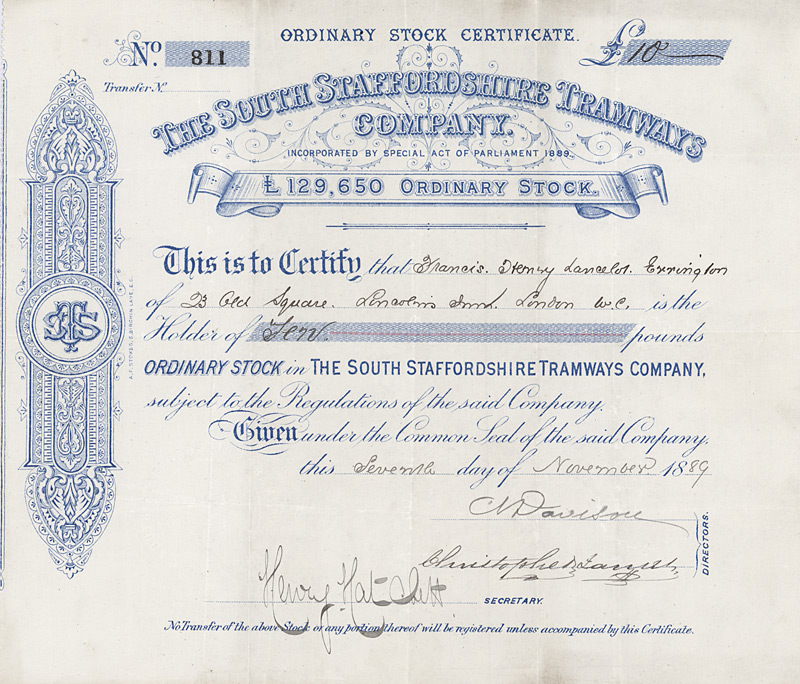
Stock of the South Staffordshire Tramways Company from 7 November 1889

Modernisation of the services was initiated on 26 August 1889 when the company changed its name to the South Staffordshire Tramways Company. A programme of electrification followed shortly afterwards, and on 1 January 1893 the routes from Walsall to Bloxwich and Darlaston to Mellish Road via Walsall had been converted.

The British Electric Traction Company purchased the electric lines on 11 June 1899 and transferred them to the South Staffordshire Tramways (Lessee) Company and leased the remaining lines from 23 June 1900.

Walsall Corporation purchased the track within their boundary on 1 January 1901 and leased them back until 31 December 1903, by which time the Walsall Corporation Tramways were in a position to operate their own services. The company worked joint services with Walsall Corporation Tramways on the routes from Wednesbury, and from Darlaston, to Walsall.

West Bromwich Corporation followed suit on 31 January 1902, and later Wednesbury, Handsworth and Dudley councils, purchasing tracks within their boundary to converting them for electric traction. They were leased them back to the company.

Electrification progressed as follows:

- 20 December 1902 Handsworth to Carter’s Green
- 24 January 1903 Carter’s Green to Great Bridge
- 19 February 1903 Carter’s Green to Hill Top
- 10 April 1903 Hill Top to Wednesbury
- 23 April 1903 Darlaston to Moxley (served by the Wolverhampton District Electric Tramways Company).
- 30 May 1903 Great Bridge to Dudley railway station
- 8 October 1903 Wednesbury to the White Horse
- 22 January 1907 Wednesbury and Dudley

On 9 October 1912 a through service between Colmore Row, Birmingham to Darlaston, via Handsworth, West Bromwich and Wednesbury started. On 26 May 1923 it was extended to Bilston (over the tracks of the Wolverhampton District Electric Tramways Company).

=== Power generation ===
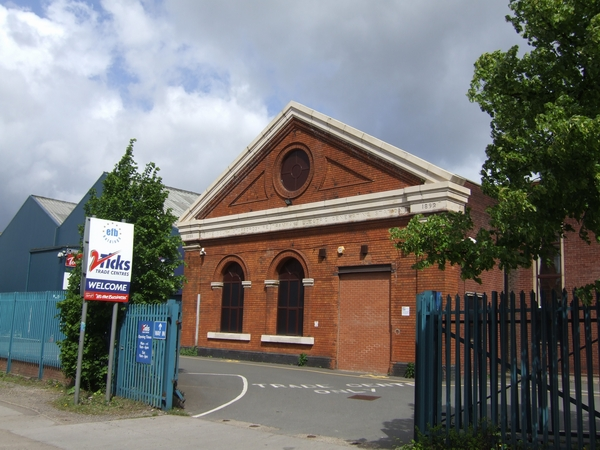
Former power station on the Darlaston and Walsall Road

The generating-station was situated near to the Birmingham Canal on the Darlaston and Walsall Road. A canal basin was formed alongside the station for the delivery of coal. The station comprised an engine-room 59 feet (18 m) by 45 feet (14 m), a boiler-house 47 feet (14 m) by 39 feet (12 m), an octagonal chimney-stack 120 feet (37 m) high, and detached oil-stores and outbuildings.

The boiler house had three Lancashire boilers working at 120 pounds (54 kg) per square inch. Each boiler was 30 feet (9.1 m) by 7 feet (2.1 m), with internal flues 33 inches (840 mm) in diameter, with five cross-tubes.

The engine room housed three compound horizontal engines and three dynamos. At 100 revolutions per minute, with a pressure of 120 pounds (54 kg) per square inch, each engine developed 125 horsepower (93 kW). At 450 revolutions per minutes the dynamos gave an output of 260 amps at 350 volts.

== Closure ==
The South Staffordshire Tramways Company came to an end on 1 April 1924, when the services were split between Birmingham Corporation Tramways the Wolverhampton District Electric Tramways Company, and the Dudley, Stourbridge and District Electric Traction Company.
