= Bluefield Solar Income Fund =

British investment trust

- Traded as: LSE: BSIF
- Industry: Investment trust
- Founded: July 2013
- Headquarters: St Peter Port, Guernsey
- Key people: John Rennocks (Chairman)
- Website: Official site

Bluefield Solar Income Fund (LSE: BSIF) was a large British investment trust. Established in 2013, it was dedicated to investing in low-carbon assets in the UK. It was listed on the London Stock Exchange and was a constituent of the FTSE 250 Index until it was acquired by Drax Group in July 2026.

== History ==
The company was the subject of an initial public offering on the London Stock Exchange when it raised £130 million in July 2013. The company acquired a portfolio of six solar farms and two wind farms from Good Energy Group in January 2022 and went on to buy another 15 solar farms and 4 wind farms in May 2022. The company raised a further £150 million with a view to acquiring further assets in June 2022.

In June 2026, Drax Group announced that it would acquire Bluefield Solar Income Fund in a transaction worth £548 million. The transaction was completed on 31 July 2026.
