= Walsall Corporation Tramways =

Tramway operator in England

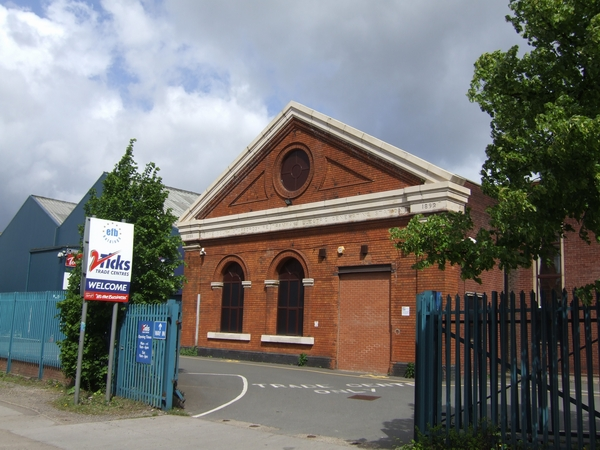
- Power station on Darlaston Road

Operation
- Locale: Walsall
- Open: 1 January 1904
- Close: 30 September 1933
- Status: Closed

Infrastructure
- Track gauge: 3 ft 6 in (1,067 mm)
- Propulsion system: Electric

Statistics
- Route length: 13.51 miles (21.74 km)

Walsall Corporation Tramways operated a tramway service in Walsall between 1904 and 1930.

== History ==
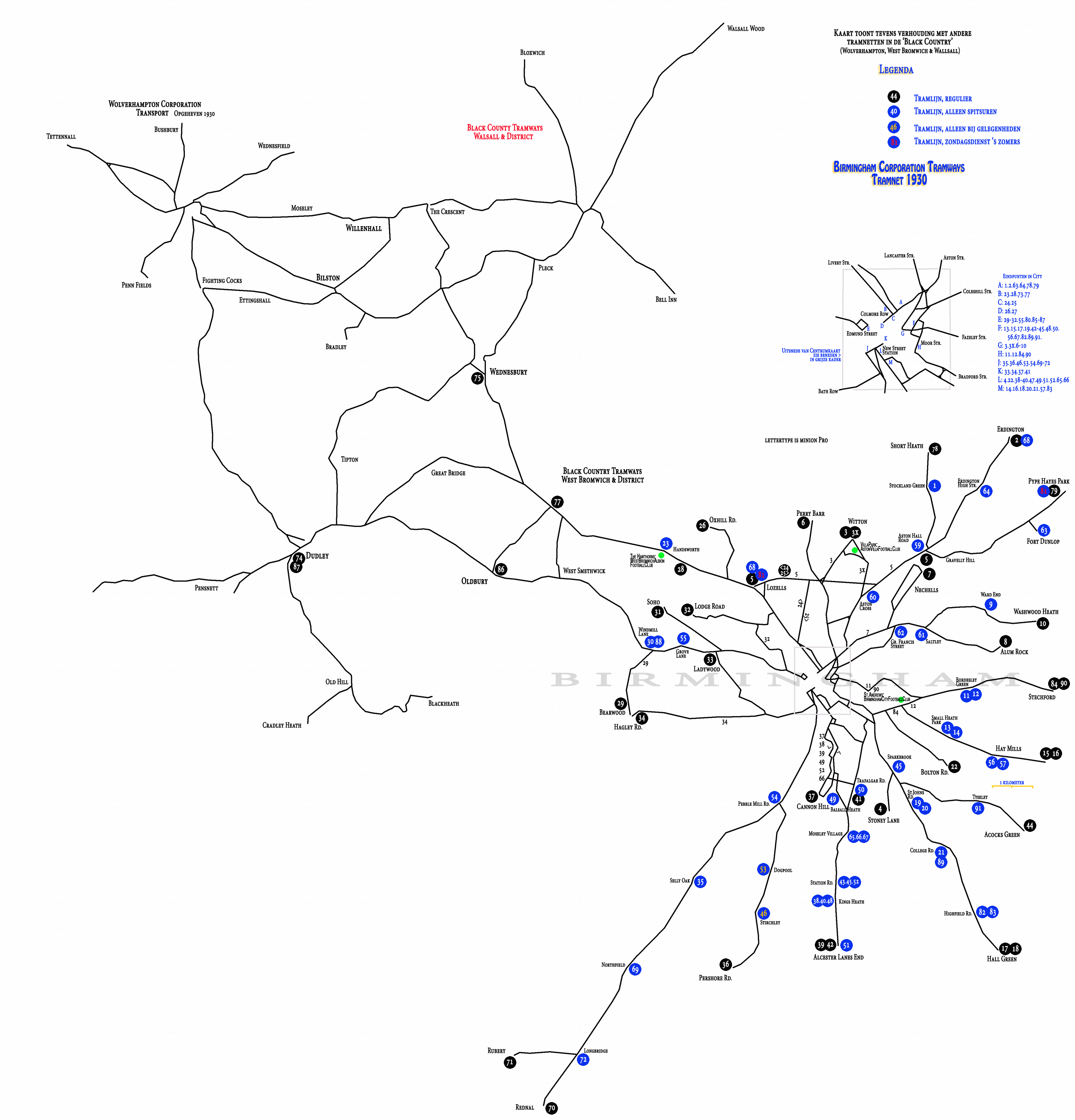
Map of the routes in the West Midlands including those in Walsall

Faced with a likely takeover of the South Staffordshire Tramways Company by British Electric Traction, Walsall Corporation made their own agreement with the South Staffordshire Tramways Company, and on 1 January 1901, for the sum of £18,500 (equivalent to £1,965,994 in 2025), Walsall Corpopation became owners of the tramway system. They leased the tramway back to the former company who operated for the next three years.

From 1901, contracts were awarded for the modernisation, electrification and extension of the system.

On 3 December 1903, Lieutenant Colonel Sir Horatio Arthur Yorke carried out an inspection of the new extensions and passed them fit for service. The official opening ceremony took place on 31 December 1903, when the mayor, the council, officials and justices of the peace were conveyed in four special cars, covering most of the routes of the new network.

Fifty drivers and fifty conductors were employed to start the corporation services which began on 1 January 1904.

In June 1905, an agreement was made with the Wolverhampton District Electric Company whereby Walsall Corporation tramcars would be allowed to work over their tracks into the Market Place at Willenhall. A junction was constructed at the Willenhall Board Schools, and Walsall tramcars first ran through to Willenhall Market Place on 19 July 1905.

1 May, 1907 through running to Wednesbury and Darlaston was begun.

Reduced services were operated in the evenings in 1916 after the Zeppelin raids. In one of these raids by LZ 61 (Zeppelin 'L 21') on 31 January 1916 tramcar 16 was on Bradford Street with the mayoress, Mrs. Mary Julia Slater on board. In Bradford Place, a bomb fell and the glass in the car was shattered. The mayoress was severely injured and died from her injuries on 20 February.

In 1920–21, the route from Pinfold to Bloxwich was doubled at a cost of £14,313 (equivalent to £605,783 in 2025). In 1922, the corporation took over responsibility for the lines from Pleck to Wood Green and James Bridge.

== Fleet ==
- 1-28 Brush Electrical Company 1903 £527 each.
- 29-32 United Electric Car Company 1908
- 33-39 United Electric Car Company 1912
- 40-49 Brush Electrical Company 1919

== Closure ==
The first abandonment took place on 1 April 1928 when the route to Walsall Wood was converted to motor bus operation.

In 1928 the Wolverhampton District Company routes were sold to the Wolverhampton Corporation Tramways.

The Birmingham Road route was abandoned on 30 September 1928, and the Willenhall route on 4 February 1929. The routes to Darlaston and Wednesbury were abandoned on 5 March 1931.

The last tram operated on 30 September 1933 when No 44 left the Bridge for Bloxwich at 11:15 pm. On 1 October 1933 the Walsall trolleybus service opened to the public.
