= Altham, Lancashire =

Village in Lancashire, England

Coordinates: 53.78°N 2.34°W

Altham
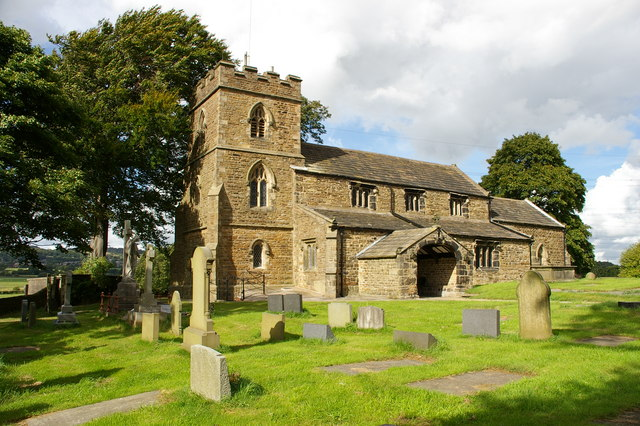
- St James' Church

- Location in Hyndburn Location within Lancashire
- Area: 2.19 sq mi (5.7 km^{2})
- Population: 1,137 (2011)
  - Density: 519/sq mi (200/km^{2})
- OS grid reference: SD775325
- Civil parish: Altham
- District: Hyndburn
- Shire county: Lancashire
- Region: North West
- Country: England
- Sovereign state: United Kingdom
- Post town: Accrington
- Postcode district: BB5
- Dialling code: 01254
- Police: Lancashire
- Fire: Lancashire
- Ambulance: North West
- UK Parliament: Hyndburn

Altham is a village and civil parish in the Borough of Hyndburn, in Lancashire, England. The village is 4 miles (6.4 km) west of Burnley, 3 miles (4.8 km) north of Accrington, and 2 miles (3.2 km) north-east of Clayton-le-Moors, and is on the A678 Blackburn to Burnley road.

The village is located in the north east corner of the parish on the River Calder, and in the south west is Altham West, a suburb of Accrington. The census of 2001 recorded a population for the parish of 897, increasing to 1,137 at the 2011 Census. However the village's 2011 population was only 343. The Ham class minesweeper HMS Altham was named after the village.

== Governance ==

Altham is in Hyndburn, a non-metropolitan district with borough status in Lancashire. Altham was once a township in the ancient parish of Whalley, this became a civil parish in 1866. From 1894 to 1974, the parish was in the Burnley Rural District.

Hyndburn Borough Council has a total of 35 councillors, two of which are elected by the ward of Altham. As of 2020, the ward is represented by two Labour Party councillors.

Altham has a parish council; its meetings are usually in Altham village. The facilities at Accrington Stanley's Crown Ground stadium have allowed some meetings to be held there, a more convenient location for the residents of Altham West. Altham is the only civil parish in the Borough of Hyndburn.

== Industry ==
Coal mining was the major industry in Altham in the 19th and early 20th centuries. After the Leeds and Liverpool Canal was opened in the 1810s, pits were located near the canal, and supplied coal to the industries of East Lancashire. Later in the century Altham Colliery (later renamed Moorfield Colliery) was opened.

The colliery closed in 1949, and Moorfield Industrial Estate is now on the site. An explosion at the colliery in 1883 resulted in the deaths of 68 people.

Altham is now home to two industrial estates, Altham Industrial Estate within the village, which is home to the building manufacturing company Easy-Trim Roofing and Construction Products Ltd, and Moorfield Industrial Estate in the southwest of the parish near Clayton-le-Moors.

== Education ==
Altham St. James C.E. Primary School is located in the village. The nearest secondary schools are in Accrington.

== Religious sites ==
Altham has an Anglican church, dedicated to St James and situated on Burnley Road. The current building, which is Grade II* listed, was built in the 16th century. However, a church has existed in the village since 1140. At first, it was dedicated to St Mary. Until 1870 it was the parish church to Accrington.

== Transport ==
Altham is on the A678 road; the nearest motorway junctions are M65 junctions 7 (west of Clayton-le-Moors) and 8 (near Huncoat). As of July 2025, the village is served by two bus routes; the 152 operated by Blackburn Bus Company, which connects the village to Burnley, Blackburn and Preston, and the M2 also operated by the Blackburn Bus Company, which connects the village to Burnley and Padiham. The M2 only runs through the village at 5:45am whereas the 152 passes the village during the day both ways every half hour, excluding Sundays when it comes every hour.

== See also ==
- Listed buildings in Altham, Lancashire
- Timothy Jollie, nonconformist minister born in Altham circa 1659
