= Wolverhampton Tramways Company =

Tramway operator in England

Operation
- Locale: Wolverhampton
- Open: 1 May 1878
- Close: 1 May 1900
- Status: Closed

Infrastructure
- Track gauge: 1,435 mm (4 ft 8 1/2 in)
- Propulsion system: Horse
- Depot: Darlington Street

Statistics
- Route length: 8.69 miles (13.99 km)

Wolverhampton Tramways Company operated a tramway service in Wolverhampton between 1878 and 1900.

== History ==
The Wolverhampton Tramways Order 1877 authorised the Wolverhampton Tramways Company to construct a horse-drawn tramway in Wolverhampton.

The company developed three routes from Queen Street in Wolverhampton

- Tettenhall
- Willenhall
- Bilston and Moxley.

The company bought Landore-Siemens Steel Company rails from Swansea, and laid them on patent chairs by Mr. Kincaid C.E., who was the engineer to the company. The 1,800 tons of rails were paved on either side with 10,000 tons of granite sets from Mount Sorrell and the Clee Hills. The cost of laying the rails was about £50,000 and £10,000 was needed for yards, stabling, horses and tramcars. The company bought a mixture of tramcars, some from H. Hughes and Co. of Leicester and others from Stevenson and Co. of New York.

The first section was inspected by Major-General Charles Scrope Hutchinson of the Board of Trade on 30 April 1878. It was recorded that the time occupied in running the tram from the yard at the bottom of Darlington Street to Queen Square and back, including turning was six minutes, and from there to the Tettenhall Road terminus, an additional nine minutes. It opened for public service on 1 May 1878 with a service every 15 minutes.

An extension from Dudley Street to Wilenhall was inspected on 5 June 1878 by Major Majendie and opened for traffic on 6 June 1878.

In mid 1880 the company obtained the permission from the Board of Trade to use steam on the 3 miles (4.8 km) route from Wolverhampton to Willenhall, and the 1.5 miles (2.4 km) route from Wolverhampton to Tettenhall. However, the Board of Trade did not approve steam on the line between Wolverhampton and Bilston because of a sharp curve at the top of Piper's Row. A steam tram built by Hughes's Locomotive & Tramway Engine Works of Loughborough. Laterly steam was confined to the Tettenhall Road line. On 10 October 1881, Wolverhampton Town Council decided that it was not in the interests of the public that steam should be sanctioned on the tram lines in the town.

=== Tram 23 ===
Built in 1892 for the Wolverhampton Tramways Company, this horse-drawn tram operated on the Queens Square to Tettenhall route. Pulled by two horses on standard gauge track it could carry 44 passengers. With the introduction of electric trams it was withdrawn from service and sold for use as a garden shelter. Acquired by the Black Country Living Museum in 1973.

== Depots ==
The company maintained three depots:

- Darlington Street
- Moseley Village
- Newbridge

== Closure ==
In 1898 Wolverhampton Corporation decided to acquire the tramway company. The capital account stood at £85,189 (equivalent to £9,570,000 in 2025) and it was reported that the original cost of the line stood at £5,900 per mile. The earnings for 1896 were reported as 1s 2d (equivalent to £10.54 in 2025) for every mile run and it was considered that the tramway had been operated very economically. The company had paid out on average 3% on the shareholders’ investment each year.

Year	Passengers carried	Miles run	Traffic receipts	Working Expenses
1895	1,494,628	215,436	£11,295	£7,735
1896	1,640,243	211,941	£12,550	£7,654

On 1 May 1900, Wolverhampton Corporation purchased those sections of the tramway that lay within its boundary and services were modernised as Wolverhampton Corporation Tramways.
