= Harrogate Gasworks Railway =

Former industrial railway in Yorkshire, England

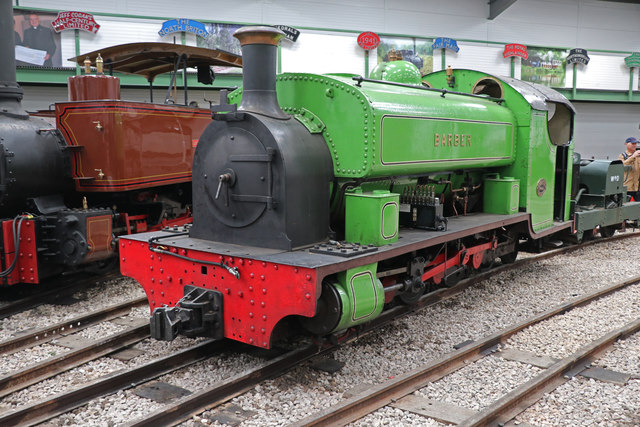
- Locomotive Barber, on the Statfold Barn Railway

Overview
- Other name: The Barber Line
- Status: Closed
- Locale: Harrogate, North Yorkshire, England
- Coordinates: 54.014°N 1.544°W
- Termini: Bilton Junction; Ripon Road

Service
- Type: Light rail

History
- Opened: 1908
- Closed: 1956

Technical
- Line length: 1.6 mi (2.6 km)
- Number of tracks: 1
- Track gauge: 2 ft (610 mm)

Harrogate Gasworks Railway was an industrial railway in the town of Harrogate, North Yorkshire, (Note: When the railway was in operation, the town was in the West Riding of Yorkshire, being moved into North Yorkshire in 1974.) England. It was built to the gauge of 2 ft and ran between Bilton Junction on the North Eastern Railway (formerly the Leeds and Thirsk Railway), to the Harrogate Gas Company's (HGC) works at New Park, north of the town centre. It opened in 1908 to carry coal to the works for gasification, and outbound byproduct liquids. It closed to traffic in 1956. The railway was noted for its tight gauge restrictions in the tunnel at New Park. Two of its steam locomotives have survived into preservation, and are still in use on heritage railways.

== History ==
A company to provide gas for Harrogate was formed in 1845, gaining an act of Parliament, the following year, the Harrogate Gas Act 1846 (9 & 10 Vict. c. xl), with the gasworks being built in the same year as the act was granted. Until 1880, coal was transported by road from Starbeck coal depot, some 3 miles (4.8 km) away, but then a specially-built loading dock at Bilton was opened for gas works traffic only. Bilton Junction was where the Leeds Northern route north of Starbeck was joined by the 1862 curve from Harrogate railway station. Due to the complaints from the local population regarding damage to the roads caused by the transport of coal from Bilton Junction to the gasworks, and the noise and pollution from the steam-powered road vehicles, a railway was built between 1907 and 1908 by the gas company. Requests to the North Eastern Railway (Note: The North Eastern Railway operated the railway system in and around Harrogate at that time.) to build a standard-gauge line were refused, and the cost of relocating the gas works to Bilton was prohibitive, so the company built a narrow-gauge railway. The directors of the gas company petitioned the shareholders to raise £20,000 (equivalent to £1,040,000 in 2025) for a railway capable of carrying 100,000 tons of coal per year. The new facilities at Bilton junction allowed for inward coal traffic for New Park works to be loaded onto purpose-built bogie hopper wagons on the narrow gauge line using gravity. It was expected to take only two minutes to transfer the load into four wagons; in general only two were in use at any one time. By-products from New Park (tar and ammoniacal liquor), were transported to Bilton and discharged by gravity from the narrow-gauge tank wagons on an elevated dock into their standard-gauge counterparts.

The new railway branched westwards from Bilton Junction in north-eastern Harrogate, but the main engineering feature of the 1.6-mile (2.6 km) branch, was an 800-yard (730 m) long tunnel, (Note: Various lengths exist for the tunnel, including 656 yards (600 m), and 600 yards (550 m).) which was 9 feet (2.7 m) high, and only 8 feet (2.4 m) wide. The original intent had been to line the tunnel throughout with stone, however, whilst it had stone portals, the rest was constructed mostly of concrete, which varied in thickness from 12 inches (300 mm) to 15 inches (380 mm). The tunnel had one ventilation shaft, and it took an s-bend course in its the southern half underneath the Skipton to Harrogate road (which later became the A59). The section of tunnel under Skipton Road was reinforced with brick. The tunnel took the railway under some houses, and the road, to exit on the eastern side of the Harrogate to Ripon road (which became the A61); the locomotive shed, a weighbridge, and a 3-compartment tank for locomotive water and by-products were located here. A large three-road coal store marked the end of the line. The gas works was located on the opposite side of the road. Coal for the retorts was manhandled using narrow-gauge tubs running in a subway below Ripon Road. The tunnel was the first part of the line to be constructed (commencing in April 1907), via a 53-foot (16 m) shaft. The line was engineered by Edward Wilson Dixon, who had also designed the Colsterdale Light Railway for the Harrogate Corporation Waterworks, running between Masham and Roundhill Reservoir. Dixon was impressed by the Thomas Green locomotives he had ordered, and recommended ordering another for the gas works line.

Several locomotives were used on the line, the best-known being Barber, named after the chairman of the Harrogate Gas Company, Alderman Francis Barber. The locomotive is notable for its low cab roof, necessitated by the loading gauge of the New Park tunnel. So tight were the restrictions in the tunnel that an escape hatch was provided in the back of the cab to allow the crew to leave this way. It would have been impossible to do so from the side of the locomotive. A second locomotive was acquired in 1919. This was a 4-6-0T built by the Hunslet Engine Company as a 600 mm gauge locomotive for the War Department for service on the Western Front. It never saw service with the War Department and after purchase by the gas company it was returned to its makers for re-gauging to 2 ft along with modifications to its chimney, dome and cab so that it could pass through the tunnel. It was named Spencer after the vice-chairman of the Harrogate Gas Company. However it had 22% less power than Barber, and could not haul the coal wagons up the 1-in-21 incline to Knox bridge, so a diversion was built with a gradient of 1-in-25. In 1944 Barber was badly worn and Spencer was not as powerful as had been hoped. Accordingly a new locomotive was sought and the contract for an 0-6-0ST was awarded to Peckett and Sons of Bristol, works number 2050. This locomotive was lettered Harrogate Gas Company on the tank sides, but never carried a name, simply being referred to as the Peckett. Barber gave her name to the line itself, this being known locally as the Barber Line. Finally in 1947 an order was placed with the Drewry Car Co. for an 0-6-0 diesel mechanical locomotive. This was not delivered until after the 1948 nationalisation of the gas industry, arriving at Bilton in September 1949. It was painted dark blue, and was lettered No.2 on the cab sides and North Eastern Gas Board (Harrogate Works) on the bonnet.

Initially the line was worked only two or three days per week, but as demand for gas grew, so did the amount of coal needed. Coal traffic in 1924 was 38,000 tons, a record 51,500 tons was carried in 1940, and 40,000 tons in 1953, but an additional 28,000 tons was brought from Bilton by road. Even working the railway 7 days per week was insufficient to meet coal demand. It was discovered that transport by diesel lorry was 25% to 33% more economical than the railway. In September 1955 it was decided to close the railway and revert to road transportation.

The last coal train ran in July 1956, with tar and ammoniacal liquor traffic running until October. Demolition began the following month. In 2007, a small museum opened next to the southern portal of the tunnel. The New Park School created a secret garden to commemorate the railway.

== Rolling stock ==
Builder	Wheel arrangement	Works No.	Operating No.	Name	Dates in service	Notes	Ref
Thomas Green & Son	0-6-2	441	441	Barber	1908–1949	Barber was preserved after its removal from the railway. The locomotive has worked on the South Tynedale Railway	
Hunslet	4-6-0	1340	3224 (Note: This was the War Departments operating number.)	Spencer	1920–1944	Built by Hunslet in February 1919, it never saw war service, and was re-gauged by Hunslet in 1920. Withdrawn in 1944, cut up at New Park and sold for scrap in 1946.	
Peckett & Sons	0-6-0	2050			1944–1956	After closure of the railway, this locomotive was acquired by the Ffestiniog Railway in 1957. The loco later underwent restoration at the Bredgar and Wormshill Light Railway, before working on the Statfold Barn Railway. In preservation, the loco has been named Harrogate.	
Drewry	0-6-0	2262			1949–1956	After closure, this locomotive was acquired (via agents) by Rhodesia Chrome Limited, Selukwe, Rhodesia (now Zimbabwe)	

The company also operated various coal wagons and tar tanks, including several Twinberrow steel-sided coal wagons, 25 feet (7.6 m) long, and capable of taking a payload of 10 tonnes (11 tons). One short wooden-built coal wagon was retained purely for carrying coal for the steam locomotive engines.
