= Whitebirk =

Suburb of Blackburn, Lancashire, England

Coordinates: 53.755°N 2.450°W

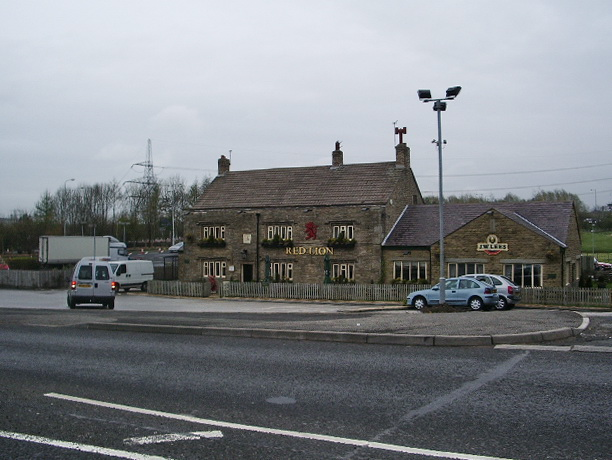
The Red Lion pub in Whitebirk.

Whitebirk is a suburb in the east of Blackburn, in Lancashire, England. Most of the suburb is in the borough of Blackburn with Darwen, with the east of the suburb being in the borough of Hyndburn. Whitebirk is part of the Blackburn urban area. The area is largely industrial, and is the eastern terminus of the town's northern bypass, the A6119, where it meets Junction 6 of the M65.

To the west of the bypass, there is Burnley Road and the Greenbank Business Park, and to the east, across the boundary in Hyndburn, is the Peel Centre Blackburn, a retail park built in the 1980s on the site of Whitebirk Power Station, which was opened in 1921, and closed in 1976.

The suburb also includes a council estate, which is situated between the A679 Accrington Road, A678 Burnley Road, and A6119 Whitebirk Road. The areas of Whitebirk are in different wards for local government: the residential area is in Shadsworth and Whitebirk, the industrial estate is in Little Harwood, and the retail park is in Rishton Ward.

== Retail ==
The Peel Centre includes Currys, PC World, ScS Sofas, Onit Furniture, Dreams, Smyths Toys Superstore, B&M Bargains, Sofaworks, Harveys Furniture and Bensons for Beds.

In January 2015, Smyths Toys Superstore announced plans to open in the park, and opened in October 2015. B&M Bargains also has presence in the centre. The Range has a store in Whitebirk, located where B&Q used to be in Blackburn, before it relocated in September 2004 to the Nova Scotia Retail Park, in the Grimshaw Park area. In December 2015, Aldi announced plans to open in the park. In April 2016, the plans were approved, although the application saw opposition. The store opened in May 2017.

Peel, the site's owner, has repeatedly had planning permission denied for a controversial expansion of the park, first in May 2005, then June 2007, and most recently August 2014, by the High Court, after an appeal was lodged.

They wanted the use of the site to be changed, by adding ASDA Living, Boots, and Next, trying to make a "copy" of Preston's Deepdale, as well as relocating other stores. In June 2007, then Blackburn MP Jack Straw announced that it would be the "death knell" for Blackburn, as did then Hyndburn MP Greg Pope, saying that it would be the "death knell" for Accrington.

A motor park in Whitebirk includes: BMW/Mini (Bowker), Audi (Thompson), Toyota (Vantage), Volkswagen (Lookers), Hippo Motor Group. Other car dealers in Whitebirk are Mercedes-Benz (Blackburn), and Ford (Evans Halshaw).

== Employers ==
EDC Blackburn was the largest manufacturer of CDs in the United Kingdom, and was located between Whitebirk and Little Harwood; the company, formerly Deluxe Global Media Services, was acquired by Entertainment Distribution Company in December 2006, and officially closed down in June 2009, when production was moved to Germany.

Bus manufacturer Darwen Group, formerly East Lancashire Coachbuilders, moved to the industrial estate in the 1990s, from its previous site in the Brookhouse area of Blackburn. It later became part of Optare and the site closed in 2012.
