= Drax Group =

British power generation company

Drax Group plc
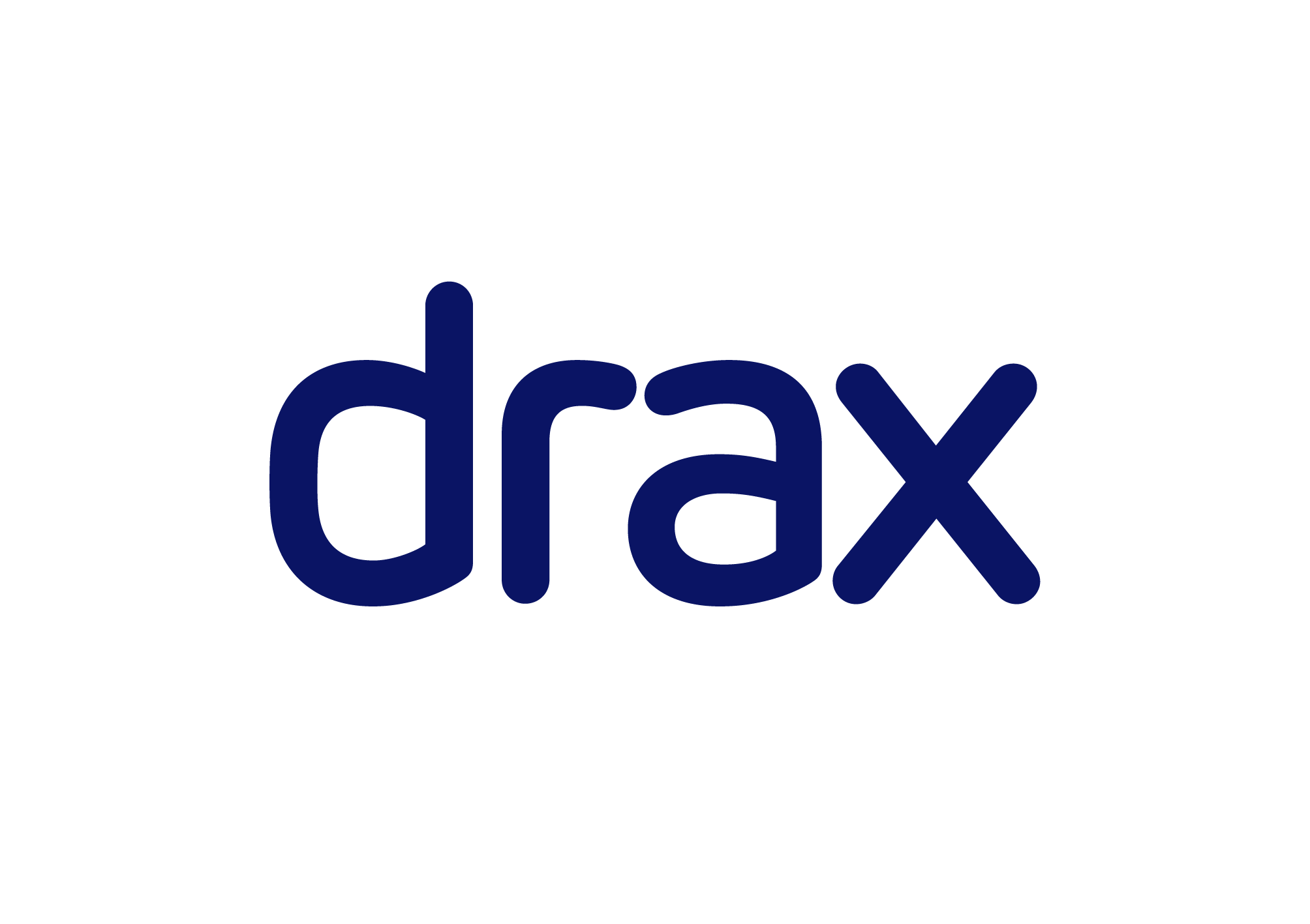
- Trade name: Drax
- Type: Public limited company
- Traded as: LSE: DRX; FTSE 250 component
- Industry: Electrical power generation
- Founded: 2005
- Headquarters: Drax, North Yorkshire, England, UK
- Key people: Andrea Bertone, Chair; Will Gardiner, Chief Executive
- Products: Electrical power and byproducts of power product
- Revenue: ▼£5,355.4 million (2025)
- Operating income: ▼£671.2 million (2025)
- Net income: ▼£68.2 million (2025)
- Number of employees: 3,250 (2024)
- Website: drax.com

Drax Group plc, trading as Drax, is a renewable energy generation, pellet production and carbon dioxide removal business. The principal enterprises include the biomass fuelled Drax Power Station, near Selby in North Yorkshire, Cruachan Power Station, near Oban in Scotland and pellet production plants across North America. The company is listed on the London Stock Exchange and is a constituent of the FTSE 250 Index.

In 2021, the company was taken out of the S&P Global Clean Energy Index, as it is no longer considered to be a "clean" energy company by the S&P.

== History ==
In 1990, the electricity industry of England and Wales was privatised under the Electricity Act 1989. Three generating companies and 12 regional electricity companies were created. As a result of privatisation, Drax Power Station came under the ownership of National Power, one of the newly formed generating companies. Over the years that followed privatisation, the map of the industry changed dramatically. One significant change was the emergence of vertically integrated companies, combining generation, distribution and supply interests. In certain cases, it became necessary for generation assets to be divested, and so in 1999 Drax Power Station was acquired by the US-based AES Corporation for £1.87 billion (US$3 billion). A partial re-financing of Drax was completed in 2000, with £400 million of senior bonds being issued by AES Drax Holdings, and £267 million of subordinated debt issued by AES Drax Energy.

Increased competition, over-capacity and new trading arrangements contributed to a significant drop in wholesale electricity prices, which hit an all-time low in 2002. Many companies experienced financial problems, and Drax Power Station's major customer went into administration, triggering financial difficulties for Drax. Following a series of standstill agreements with its creditors, the AES Corporation and Drax parted company in August 2003. During the restructuring, a number of bids were received from companies wishing to take a stake in the ownership of Drax, but creditors voted overwhelmingly to retain their interest in Drax. In December 2003, the restructuring was completed and Drax came under the ownership of a number of financial institutions.

Almost exactly two years later, on 15 December 2005, Drax underwent a re-financing and shares in Drax Group plc were listed on the London Stock Exchange for the first time.

The company has attracted a series of protests in the past. A climate camp on 31 August 2006, attended by over 600 people, protested against the high carbon emissions; 39 people were arrested after trying illegally to gain access to the plant. On 13 June 2008, a train protest attended by 30 climate change campaigners halted an EWS coal train en route to the station, On 18 June 2009, during a wildcat strike up to 200 contractors walked out or failed to show up.

In 2009, Drax Group acquired Haven Power – enabling it to sell electricity directly. In 2015, the Group acquired Billington Bioenergy, specialists in providing sustainable biomass pellets for domestic energy systems.

In October 2011, a fire started by spontaneous combustion in a stockpile at the Port of Tyne biomass facility. Another fire occurred at the same facility in a conveyor transfer tower in October 2013.

In 2016, Drax Group acquired Opus Energy for £340 million funded by a new acquisition debt facility of up to £375 million. In October 2017, Drax sold Billington Bioenergy for £2 million to an AIM-listed energy company called Aggregated Micro Power Holdings.

On 16 October 2018, Drax Group announced that it had agreed to acquire Scottish Power's portfolio of pumped storage, hydro and gas-fired generation for £702 million in cash from Iberdrola, subject to shareholder approval. Drax confirmed that approval had been granted on 1 January 2019. The acquisition brings with it Cruachan pumped storage power station, Rye House power station, Damhead Creek power station, Galloway hydro-electric power scheme, Lanark Hydro Electric Scheme, Shoreham Power Station and Blackburn Mill power station.

A "virtual protest" was held in April 2020 by Biofuelwatch, which claimed that Drax was the UK's largest emitter of carbon dioxide and that the wood pellets Drax burns were leading to the destruction of forests in the southern United States. Protesters also claimed that the company was burning more wood than any other power station in the world.

On 15 December 2020, Drax Group announced the sale of Rye House, Damhead Creek, Shoreham and Blackburn Mill to VPI Holdings for £193.3m.

In January 2021, the company proposed to build a new 3.6 GW gas-fired power plant at Selby which was expected to produce 75% of the UK's power sector emissions once the plant was underway. A protest took place outside the company's offices in London in July 2019 and further protests took place in Yorkshire in August 2020. Protesters claimed that the company was asking for substantial subsidies to operate the new plant "in addition to the £2.36 million a day it already receives for burning biomass." After ministers overruled objections from the planning authority and approved the plant, a legal challenge was brought against the decision but failed in the courts in January 2021. However, the company announced in February 2021 that the plans for the new plant had been abandoned.

On 13 April 2021, Drax announced that it had completed the acquisition of Pinnacle Renewable Energy Inc.

On 3 October 2022, BBC Panorama aired an episode showing how pellets burned in Drax powerplants came from natural growth forest in British Columbia. This continued to be an issue throughout 2024 and 2025, with Drax accused of burning 250-year-old trees sourced from forests in Canada.

In November 2024, Drax Group Plc pushed back the start of three new gas-fired power stations in South Wales, Suffolk, and Bedfordshire to next year because of delays in getting the units connected to the grid. Drax had previously stated that the facilities would start in Autumn 2024.

Drax received over £7 billion of subsidies from 2012 to February 2025 from UK taxpayers. In 2024 alone, Drax's annual report showed that the company received £869 million in public subsidies. This equated to over £2 million per day in subsidies, an average cost of around £10/year per household in the UK. The firm would not have achieved its profitability of £1.06 billion in 2024 without taxpayer subsidies. Michael Shanks, the UK Minister of State for Energy, agreed that the subsidy arrangements had allowed Drax to make "unacceptably large profits". The government said that a new subsidy arrangement from 2027 to 2031 would see Drax receiving only £470m from UK taxpayers per year.

In January 2026, it was announced that Drax had agreed to acquire Flexitricity, a UK-based optimiser of flexible energy assets, from the energy investment company, Quinbrook in a deal valuing the business at £36 million. The transaction was expected to complete in the first quarter of 2026, subject to regulatory approvals and customary closing conditions.

In July 2026, the company acquired Bluefield Solar Income Fund, a listed company with a portfolio of solar and wind farms, in a transaction worth £548 million.

== Operations ==
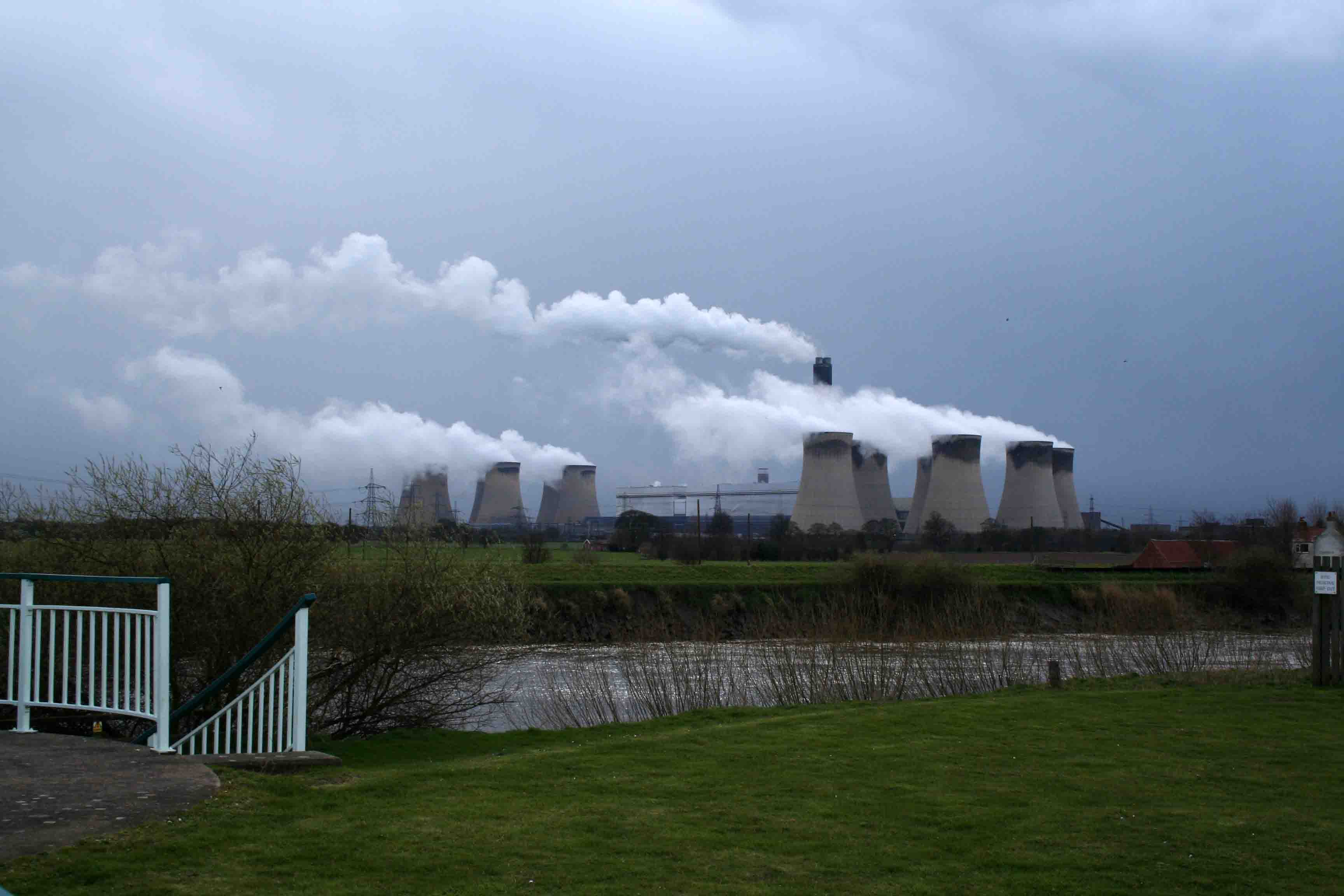
Drax Power Station

Drax Group's key asset is Drax Power Station. Originally built, owned and operated by the Central Electricity Generating Board (CEGB), Drax Power Station was constructed and commissioned in two stages. Stage one (units 1, 2 and 3) was completed in 1974. Some 12 years later in 1986, stage two (units 4, 5 and 6) was completed. Drax was the last coal-fired power station to be built in the UK, and was initially designed to use low-sulphur coal from the nearby Selby coalfield in six generating units. Each unit has a capacity of 660 MW when burning coal, giving a total capacity of just under 4 GW. This made Drax the largest power station in the UK.

Related enterprises include Drax Biomass (which specialises in producing biomass pellets to be used to generate electricity and fuel domestic heating systems), Baton Rouge Transit (which is responsible for storing and loading the biomass at the Port of Baton Rouge), Haven Power (an electricity supplier) and Opus Energy (a supplier of gas and electricity to businesses across the United Kingdom).
