= Blackburn and Over Darwen Tramways Company =

United Kingdom tram company

Coordinates: 53.680388°N 2.458901°W

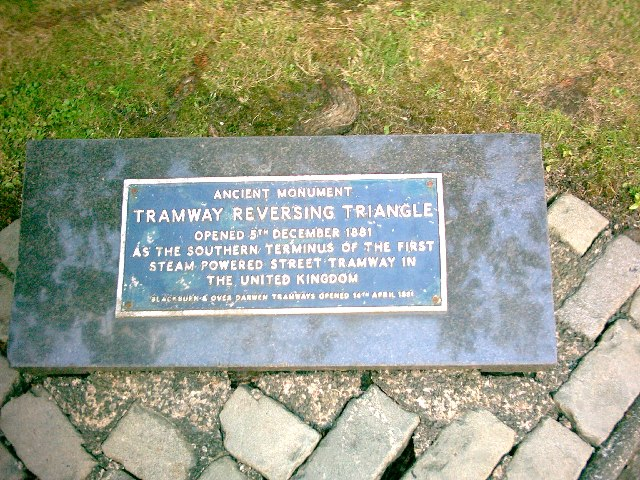
- Plaque marking the turning triangle in Darwen.

Operation
- Locale: Blackburn, Darwen
- Open: 14 April 1881
- Close: 31 December 1898
- Status: Closed

Infrastructure
- Track gauge: 3 ft 6 in (1,067 mm)
- Propulsion system: Steam

Statistics
- Route length: 4.9 miles (7.9 km)

The Blackburn and Over Darwen Tramways Company operated a steam tramway service between Blackburn and Darwen between 1881 and 1898.

== History ==
Blackburn and Over Darwen Tramways Act 1879
- Act of Parliament
- Parliament of the United Kingdom
- Long title: An Act to authorise the construction of Tramways for connecting the Towns of Blackburn and Over Darwen; and for other purposes.
- Citation: 42 & 43 Vict. c. ccxxv

Dates
- Royal assent: 15 August 1879

Other legislation
- Repealed by: County of Lancashire Act 1984

Status: Repealed

Text of statute as originally enacted

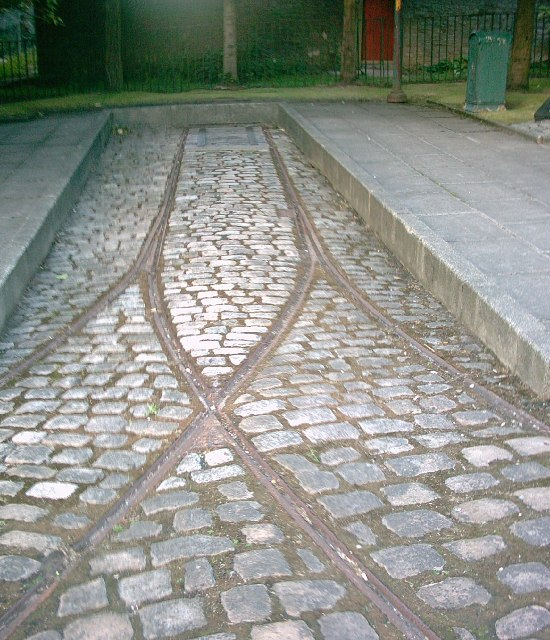
Steam tram turning triangle in Darwen

The tramway was authorised by the Blackburn and Over Darwen Tramways Act 1879 (42 & 43 Vict. c. ccxxv).

The route started in the centre of Blackburn, and followed Darwen Street, Bolton Road, then through Ewood, Earcroft, Hawkshaw, and terminating in Darwen at Whitehall.

Six steam trams were acquired from Kitson and Company for the inauguration of the service. This fleet was later augmented to 15, with 7 of the additional trams being obtained from Thomas Green & Son.

The initial passenger cars were built by Ashbury on Eades patent reversible trucks. The seating capacity was 20 in the lower saloon and 26 on top. Later passenger cars were obtained from G. F. Milnes & Co. of Birkenhead.

The service came into operation after inspection from General Hutchinson of the Board of Trade.

== Closure ==
The company was acquired by Blackburn Corporation for £22,337 (equivalent to £2,510,174 in 2025) and Darwen Corporation for £26,163 (equivalent to £2,940,130 in 2025) on 31 December 1898. Steam tram services continued until 1901.
