= Opus Energy =

UK energy company

Opus Energy Limited
- Type: Private
- Industry: Utilities
- Founded: 2002
- Headquarters: Drax Power Station, England, UK,
- Key people: Paul Sheffield, (Managing Director)
- Products: Electricity, Gas
- Number of employees: 860 (January 2017)
- Parent: Drax Group
- Website: opusenergy.com

Opus Energy Limited supplied gas and electricity to businesses across the United Kingdom. It purchases electricity from wind, solar, hydro, and anaerobic digestion generators, and provides support to develop energy-generating sites. It is headquartered in Northampton, United Kingdom with an additional office in Oxford. It shares the same management as Haven Power.

== History ==
The company was established in 2001 as Oxford Power Holdings Limited; it was renamed on 28 October 2010. On 6 December 2016 it was announced that Opus Energy had entered into a binding conditional agreement for the sale of the entire issues share capital to Drax Developments Limited, a member of the Drax Group. The deal completed on 10 February 2017.

In 2021 Opus Energy was the 2nd largest provider of business gas in the UK and the 5th largest provider of business electricity.

In 2025, Opus Energy was listed as a recommended business energy supplier by EnergyCosts.co.uk, due to its "competitive energy prices, flexibility in tariffs, and a commitment to green energy".

== Operations ==
Opus Energy sources its electricity from renewable sources.

Opus Energy provides a power purchase agreement product whereby it offers to buy excess power from companies who create their own renewable energy.

On Thursday 8 October 2020, Opus Energy announced that its Fuel Mix Disclosure for the reporting period April 2019 to March 2020 remained 100% renewable. It is the third consecutive year that its electricity is 100% renewable, where its electricity supply has been independently verified by EcoAct.
