= Listed buildings in Altham, Lancashire =

Altham is a civil parish in Hyndburn, Lancashire, England. It contains five buildings that are recorded in the National Heritage List for England as designated listed buildings. Of these, one is listed at Grade II*, the middle grade, and the others are at Grade II. The listed buildings consists of a church, houses and cottages, a bridge over the Leeds and Liverpool Canal, and a former corn mill.

== Key ==
Grade	Criteria
II*	Particularly important buildings of more than special interest
II	Buildings of national importance and special interest

== Buildings ==
Name and location	Photograph	Date	Notes	Grade
St James' Church; 53.79354°N 2.34803°W		15th century	The tower was added and the chancel was rebuilt in 1859, and in 1881 a chapel was rebuilt by Paley and Austin. The church is constructed in sandstone with a stone-slate roof, and it is mainly in Perpendicular style. It consists of a nave with a clerestory, aisles, a south porch, a chancel, and a west tower. The tower has three stages and a battlemented parapet. In the porch part of a Norman font has been incorporated in a side bench.	II*
Mill House and Cottages; 53.79266°N 2.34334°W	—	Early 18th century (probable)	These were originally a house and two cottages, and were later converted into two dwellings. They are in sandstone with stone-slate roofs and have two storeys. The cottage on the left has one bay and is canted with an extension to the rear; the other cottage and house each have two bays. There are sash windows in the house; the rest of the glazing has been altered.	II
Altham Bridge; 53.78311°N 2.34214°W		c. 1800	The bridge, number 118, carries Altham Road over the Leeds and Liverpool Canal. It is in sandstone and consists of a single elliptical arch with rusticated voussoirs, bands, parapets, and pilasters at the ends of the walls. The bridge also carries an iron pipe.	II
Corn Mill; 53.79284°N 2.34315°W	—	1816	Originating as a corn mill by the River Calder, the building has since served different purposes. It is in sandstone with a stone-slate roof, and has an L-shaped plan. There are three storeys at the front and four at the rear. At the left end is a boiler house and a tapering cylindrical stone chimney with a moulded cap.	II
Moor Side House; 53.77923°N 2.36535°W		c. 1830	A stuccoed house with a stone-slate roof in Perpendicular Gothic style. It has two storeys and a symmetrical three-bay front, with a single-bay service wing to the rear. On the front is a Tudor arched doorway and mullioned windows. There are sash windows at the rear.	II
