= Blackburn Corporation Tramways =

Tramway operator in England

Operation
- Locale: Blackburn
- Open: 28 May 1887
- Close: 3 September 1949
- Status: Closed

Infrastructure
- Track gauge: 4'0" (1219 mm)
- Propulsion systems: Horse, steam then electric

Statistics
- Route length: 14.73 miles (23.71 km)

Blackburn Corporation Tramways operated a tramway service in Blackburn, Lancashire, England between 1887 and 1949.

== History ==
Blackburn Corporation Tramways Act 1887
- Act of Parliament
- Parliament of the United Kingdom
- Long title: An Act to extend the time for construction of Tramways authorised by the Blackburn Improvement Act 1882 and for other purposes.
- Citation: 50 & 51 Vict. c. xlvi

Dates
- Royal assent: 23 May 1887

Other legislation
- Repealed by: County of Lancashire Act 1984

Status: Repealed

Text of statute as originally enacted

The Blackburn Corporation Tramways Company, Limited, was established in 1886 by Cosh & Cramp, a partnership of a London-based tramway contractor and engineer, Charles Courtney Cramp and Richard Lawrence Cosh. It was set up to operate the tramway on behalf of Blackburn Corporation.

Blackburn Corporation operated a tramway from 28 May 1887. There were two routes operated by steam power, and two by horse-drawn trams. Fourteen steam engines were obtained from Thomas Green & Son at a cost of £700 (equivalent to £80,000 in 2025) each.

In 1888, Robert Walter Cramp, brother of Charles Courtney Cramp, was appointed manager.

On 24 August 1898, Blackburn Corporation purchased the company for £77,210 (equivalent to £8.7 million in 2025), and undertook a programme of modernisation and electrification. The power station was at the junction of Bridge Street, and Jubilee Street.

The company acquired 48 tramcars from G.F. Milnes & Co. and 12 from United Electric Car Company which were decorated in an olive green and ivory livery.

The company had a through running arrangement with the cars of the Darwen Corporation Tramways system.

== Closure ==
The last service ran on 3 September 1949.
