= M65 motorway =

Motorway in England

M65
- M65 highlighted in blue
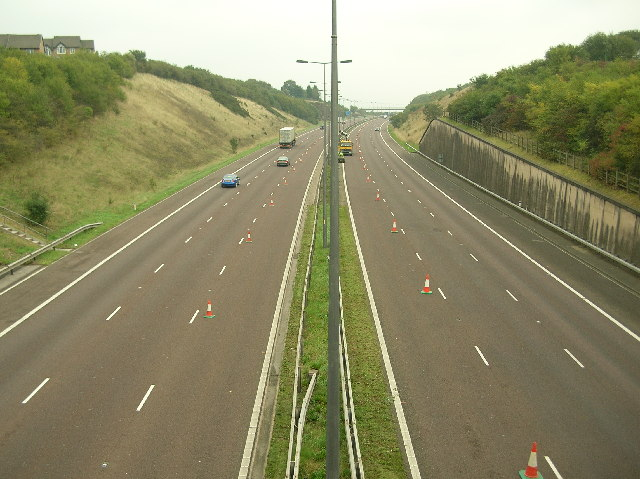
- Between junctions 7 & 8, 2005

Route information
- Maintained by: National Highways; Lancashire County Council
- Length: 25.8 mi (41.5 km)
- Existed: 1981–present
- History: Opened: 1981; Completed: 1997

Major junctions
- West end: Preston South
- J1 → M6 motorway; J2 → M61 motorway
- East end: Colne

Location
- Country: United Kingdom
- Counties: Lancashire
- Primary destinations: Preston; Blackburn; Burnley; Colne

Road network
- Roads in the United Kingdom; Motorways; A and B road zones
← M62	→ M66

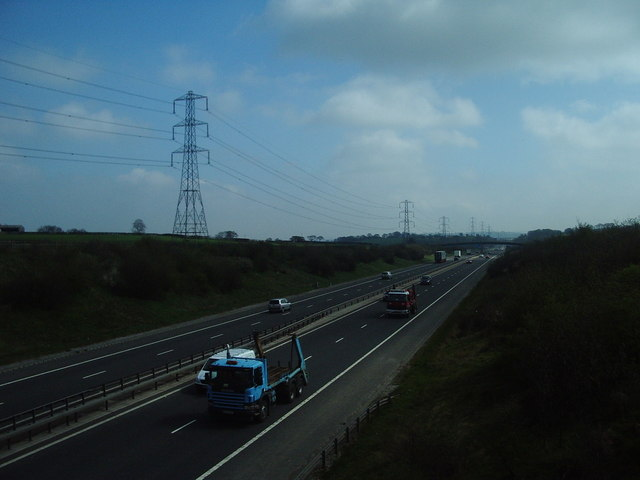
Looking east along the newest section

The M65 is a motorway between Preston and Colne in Lancashire, England. It runs from Bamber Bridge just south of Preston, through major junctions with the M6 and M61 motorways, east past Darwen, Blackburn, Accrington, Burnley, Brierfield, Nelson and ends at Colne.

== History ==
The M65 was opened in the following sections:

- Junctions 10 to 12 (Burnley to Brierfield) in 1981
- Junctions 7 to 10 (Hyndburn to Burnley) in 1983
- Junctions 12 to 13 (Brierfield to Nelson) in 1983
- Junctions 6 to 7 (Whitebirk to Accrington/Hyndburn) in 1984
- Junctions 13 to 14 (Nelson to Colne) in 1988
- Junctions 1a to 6 M6 to Whitebirk in 1997

The first section of the motorway was opened in 1981, connecting Burnley to Brierfield. Over the years, several extensions were made, the largest being the link from Whitebirk to the M6 and M61 motorways in 1997.

This extension was the scene of a standoff between construction security workers and protesters forming part of the environmental direct action movement. Protesters occupied abandoned buildings in Darwen, parts of Stanworth Woods near Feniscowles and needed to be physically removed.

Junctions 1a to 6 were opened 18 December 1997 by Jack Straw, Home Secretary and Member of Parliament (MP) for Blackburn. The opening ceremony took place on the westbound carriageway beneath junction 5 at Guide with a heavy police presence as protesters threatened to bring a halt to the proceedings.

Much of the 1997 extension was relaid shortly after it opened with a new, quieter tarmac because the amount of road noise had been so great that it prevented birds of prey (mainly owls) from foraging effectively.

Originally, the M65 was planned to go via the town centre of Blackburn.

The motorway is maintained by National Highways up to Junction 10 with Lancashire County Council taking over responsibility from this junction until the end of the motorway at Junction 14.

== Features ==
=== Unusual spur road (Walton Summit Motorway) ===
When the M65 was extended, a slip road was built at Walton Summit, southeast of Preston, from the roundabout linking junction 9 of the M61 with junction 2 of the M65 to the Walton Summit industrial estate. It is a single-carriageway road, with two lanes towards the junction (uphill) and one away (downhill). It is around 600 yards long and replaced an A-road spur of the A6 that was built in the 1980s.

According to the statutory instrument that authorised its construction, the road is officially classified as a 'special link road to connect the [M65/M61 roundabout] with the all-purpose road known as Tramway Lane'. According to Lancashire County Council, it is the 'M61 Link Tramway Lane to Junction 9' and is part of the M61. In 2007, the approach signs from Walton Summit were modified to read 'M61', but the signs still mark the roundabout at the eastern end.

== Legislation ==
Each motorway in England requires that a statutory instrument be published, detailing the route of the road, before it can be built. The dates given on these statutory instruments relate to when the document was published, and not when the road was built. Provided below is an incomplete list of statutory instruments relating to the route of the M65.

- Statutory Instrument 1991 No. 722: The M65 Motorway (Bamber Bridge to Whitebirk Section, Blackburn Southern Bypass) and Connecting Roads Scheme 1991. S.I. 1991/722
- Statutory Instrument 1992 No. 2651: The M65 Motorway (Bamber Bridge to Whitebirk Section, Blackburn Southern Bypass) and Connecting Roads Scheme 1991 Variation Scheme 1992. S.I. 1992/2651

== Junctions ==
The entire route is in Lancashire.

M65 motorway junctions
Location	mi	km	Junction	Destinations	Notes
Bamber Bridge	0.0	0.0	1A (Note: Junction 1A: 53.7179°N 2.6749°W)	A6 / A582 – Preston, Bamber Bridge	
Bamber Bridge	0.8	1.3	1 (Note: Junction 1: 53.7156°N 2.6614°W)	M6 – The South, Birmingham, The North West, Lancaster	Also M6 Junction 29
Bamber Bridge	2.2	3.5	2 (Note: Junction 2: 53.7183°N 2.6297°W)	M61 – Manchester, The North West, Lancaster	Also M61 Junction 9
—	4.9	7.9	3 (Note: Junction 3: 53.7159°N 2.5626°W)	A674 – Blackburn (West) A675 – Bolton	
Blackburn	8.4	13.5	4 (Note: Junction 4: 53.7165°N 2.4791°W)	A666 – Blackburn (South), Bolton, Darwen	Blackburn with Darwen services
Blackburn	10.1	16.3	5 (Note: Junction 5: 53.7252°N 2.4458°W)	A6077 / B6232 – Shadsworth	
Blackburn	12.4	20.0	6 (Note: Junction 6: 53.7564°N 2.4334°W)	A678 – Blackburn (North & East)	
Accrington	14.5	23.3	7 (Note: Junction 7: 53.7658°N 2.3910°W)	A6185 – Accrington, Clitheroe	
—	17.3	27.8	8 (Note: Junction 8: 53.7813°N 2.3290°W)	A56 – Bury, Manchester A6068 – Clitheroe	
—	18.5	29.8	9 (Note: Junction 9: 53.7844°N 2.2997°W)	A679 – Burnley (West)	no eastbound entrance or westbound exit
Burnley	19.9	32.0	10 (Note: Junction 10: 53.7900°N 2.2658°W)	A671 – Padiham, Burnley (Central)	
Burnley	20.8	33.5	11 (Note: Junction 11: 53.7976°N 2.2523°W)	B6434 – Burnley, Nelson	no westbound entrance or eastbound exit
Nelson	23.4	37.7	12 (Note: Junction 12: 53.8305°N 2.2340°W)	A682 – Nelson, Brierfield	
Nelson	24.5	39.4	13 (Note: Junction 13: 53.8434°N 2.2182°W)	A682 – Nelson, Kendal	
Colne	25.9	41.7	14 (Note: Unnumbered junction: 53.8541°N 2.1909°W)	A6068 – Skipton, Keighley, Nelson, Colne	
1.000 mi = 1.609 km; 1.000 km = 0.621 mi: Incomplete access

Coordinate list

== See also ==
- List of motorways in the United Kingdom
- Mancunian Way, another motorway with a secret number
