= Wolverhampton Corporation Tramways =

Former public transport company in Wolverhampton

Operation
- Locale: Wolverhampton
- Open: 1 May 1900
- Close: 26 August 1928
- Status: Closed

Infrastructure
- Track gauge: 3 ft 6 in (1,067 mm)
- Propulsion system: Electric

Statistics
- Route length: 13.85 miles (22.29 km)

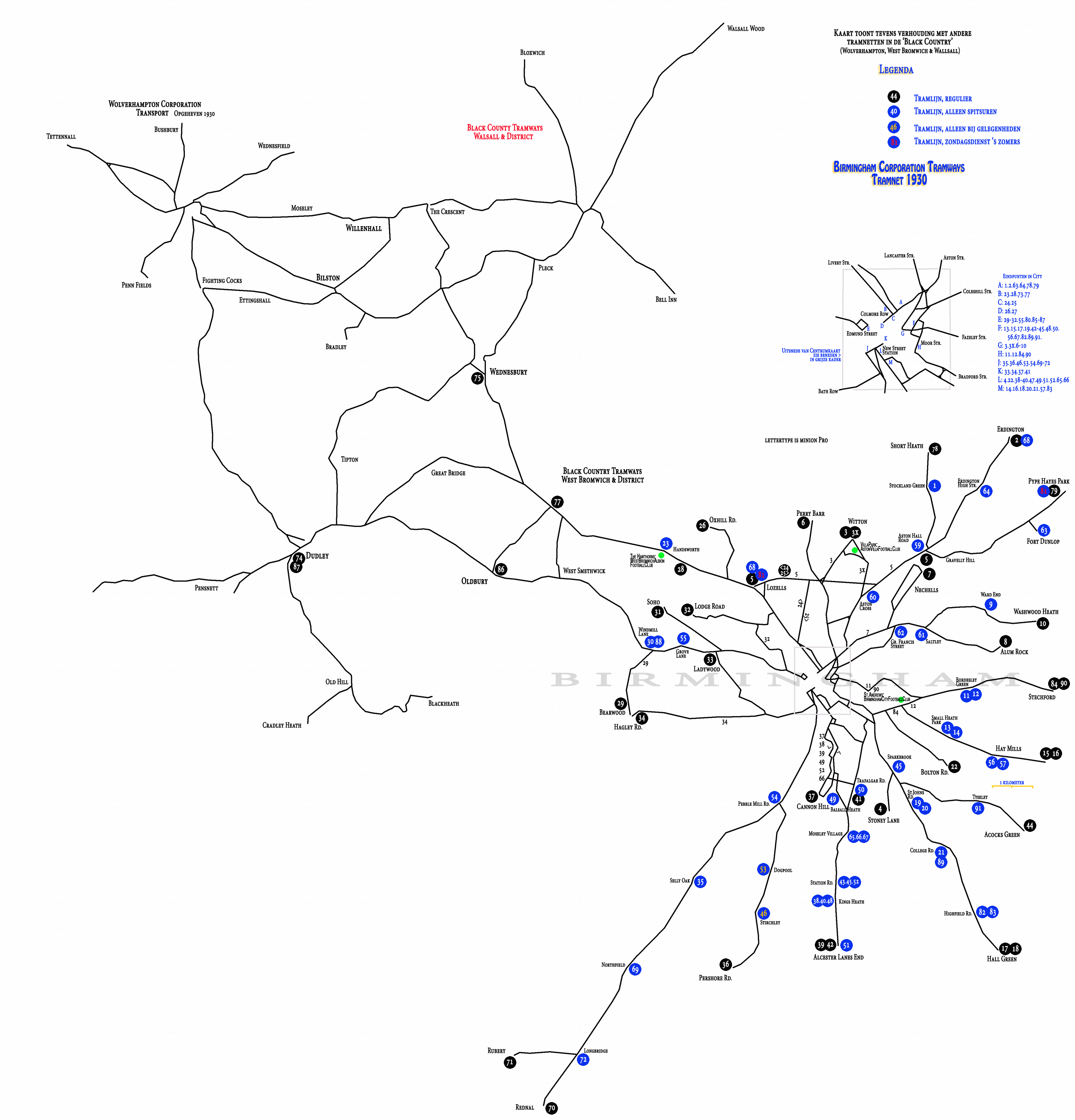
Map of the tram routes in 1930 including those in Birmingham

Wolverhampton Corporation Tramways operated a tramway service in Wolverhampton between 1902 and 1928.

== History ==
On 1 May 1900, for the sum of £26,750, Wolverhampton Corporation bought the Wolverhampton Tramways Company which had operated a standard gauge horse-drawn tramway since 1878. At the start of operation, the drivers and conductors were equipped with a coat and trousers of blue cloth with orange piping, and a peaked “W.C.T.” cap.

A modernisation scheme followed immediately re-gauging to 3'6" and electrification. The tramway was unique in using the Lorain stud contact system, and because of this, connections to other networks in the area could not be made until 1921, when the council decided to convert to overhead wiring.

The first line from the depot to the Bilston boundary, 1 mile in length, opened on 6 February 1902. The main service connected Wolverhampton railway station with the 1902 exhibition in West Park. Some of the costs of construction were offset by visitors to this exhibition, as it was reported that the tramway carried 3,000,000 passengers were carried.

Additional lines soon followed:

- Cleveland Road to Victoria Square, 30 April 1902
- Victoria Square to Coleman Street, 1 May 1902
- Victoria Square via Chapel Ash to Tettenhall, 12 June 1902
- Coleman Street via New Hampton Road to Newbridge, 5 August 1902
- Newbridge to Wergs Road, 13 September 1902
- Waterloo Road to Molineux Football Ground, 20 September 1902
- Church Street to New Street, Wednesfield, 31 October 1904
- Queen Square to Penn Fields 10 September 1909

Lines were converted to trolleybus operation and the last tram ran on 26 August 1928.

== Fleet ==
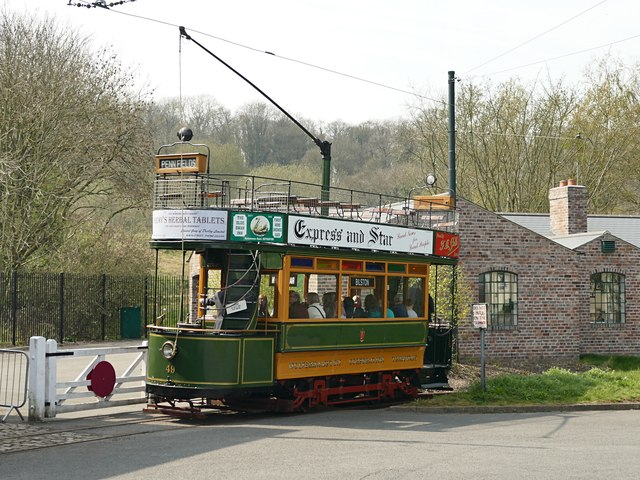
Wolverhampton Corporation Tramways No. 49 at the Black Country Living Museum

The company ordered 24 tramcars for its initial operations

- 1-9 Electric Railway and Tramway Carriage Works
- 10-18 G.F. Milnes & Co.
- 19-24 Electric Railway and Tramway Carriage Works

Later additions were:

- 25-30 G.F. Milnes & Co. 1904
- 31-40 United Electric Car Company 1905
- 41-43 United Electric Car Company 1906
- 44-46 United Electric Car Company 1908
- 47-49 United Electric Car Company 1909
- 50-52 United Electric Car Company 1913
- 53-58 English Electric 1920
- 59-61 English Electric 1921
- 62-69 Brush Electrical Machines 1922

== Notable people ==
=== General managers ===
- William Aubrey Luntley 1902 - 1915

Appointed in 1902 at a salary of £250 (equivalent to £26,567 in 2025) per annum In 1906 it was agreed to increment the salary by £25 per annum until a maximum of £350 per annum was reached.

- Charles Owen Silvers 1915 - 1928

Formerly deputy general manager appointed in 1915 at a salary of £350 (equivalent to £31,108 in 2025) per annum rising to £500 in three years. By 1925 the salary was £850 and it was agreed to increase it to £950 (equivalent to £49,935 in 2025).

== Surviving trams ==
- Tram 49. Built in 1909 for operation by Wolverhampton Corporation Tramways. It is a typical Edwardian double decker tramcar with an ornate lower saloon and open upper deck with traverse seating. Originally equipped with the Lorain system taking its power supply from studs in the road, it was later converted to run from overhead wires. Preserved in 1976, the tram was painstakingly restored by the Black Country Living Museum Transport Group over many years and completed in 2004. The Tram is in operational condition.
