= Trawden Forest =

Civil parish in Lancashire, England

Coordinates: 53.843°N 2.137°W

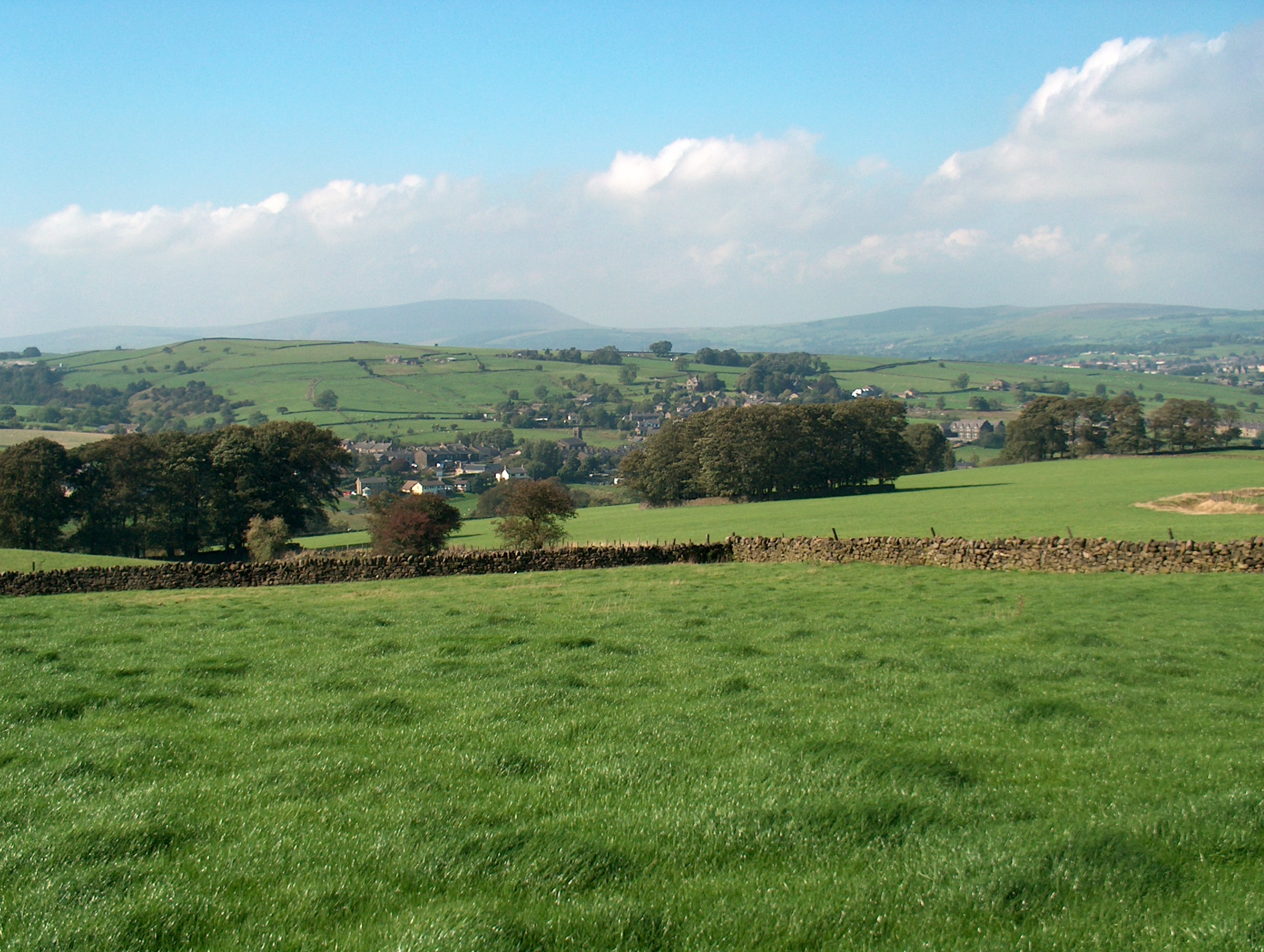
- Trawden countryside

- Location in Pendle Borough Location within Lancashire
- Population: 2,765 (2011)
- OS grid reference: SD9139
- Civil parish: Trawden Forest
- District: Pendle
- Shire county: Lancashire
- Region: North West
- Country: England
- Sovereign state: United Kingdom
- Post town: Colne
- Postcode district: BB8
- Dialling code: 01282
- Police: Lancashire
- Fire: Lancashire
- Ambulance: North West
- UK Parliament: Pendle and Clitheroe

Trawden Forest is a civil parish in the Pendle district of Lancashire, England. It has a population of 2,765, and contains the village of Trawden (formerly called Beardshaw) and the hamlets of Cottontree, Winewall and Wycoller. Boulsworth Hill is a well known local landmark situated within the parish. It takes its name from a medieval royal forest or "chase" which was in the same area.

Trawden was once a township in the ancient parish of Whalley. This became a civil parish in 1866, forming an urban district from 1894.

The parish adjoins the Pendle parishes of Nelson, Colne and Laneshaw Bridge, the Burnley parish of Briercliffe and West Yorkshire.

According to the United Kingdom Census 2011, the parish has a population of 2,765, an increase from 2,580 in the 2001 census.

== Media gallery ==
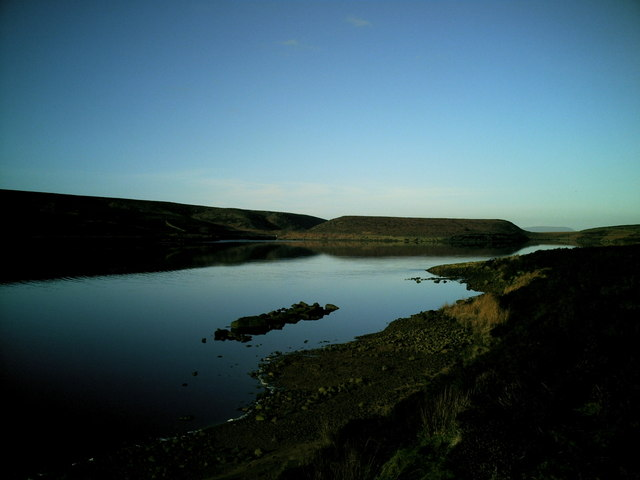
Watersheddles Reservoir

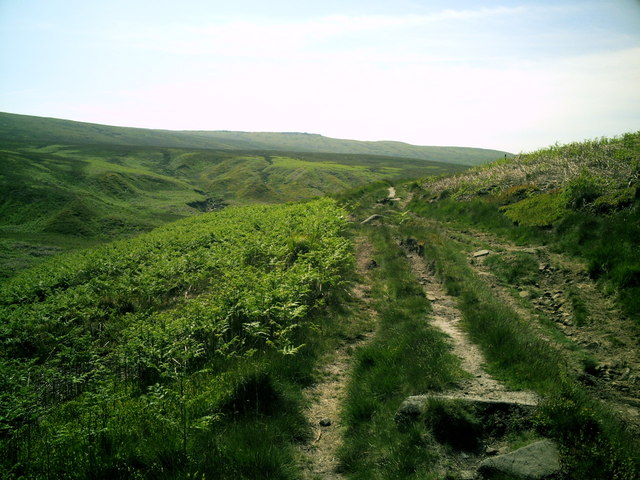
The Brontë Way crossing Brink Ends Moor

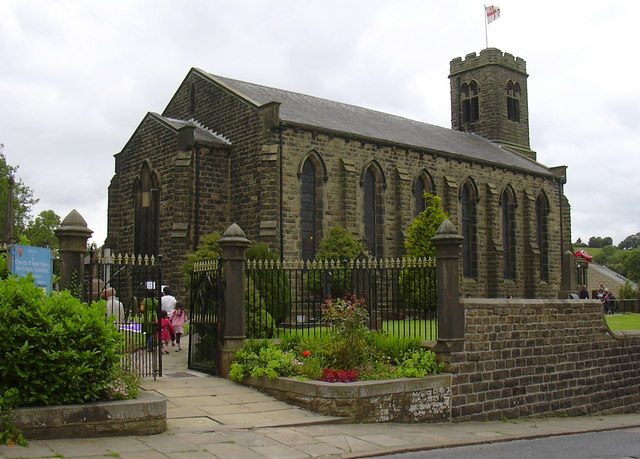
Church of St Mary the Virgin, Trawden

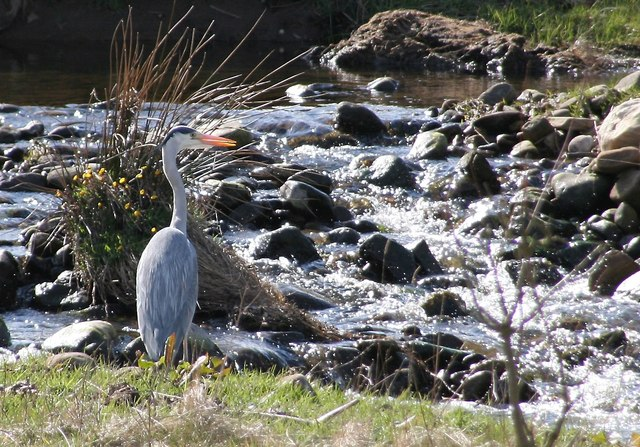
Wycoller Beck

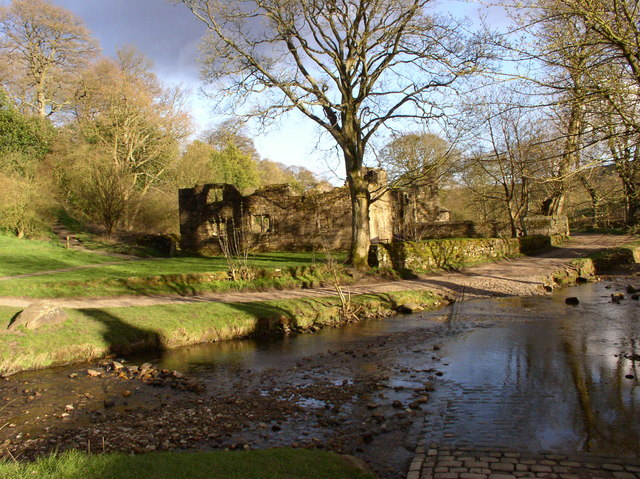
The ruins of Wycoller Hall

== See also ==
- Listed buildings in Trawden Forest
