= Cottontree and Winewall =

Coordinates: 53.856°N 2.140°W

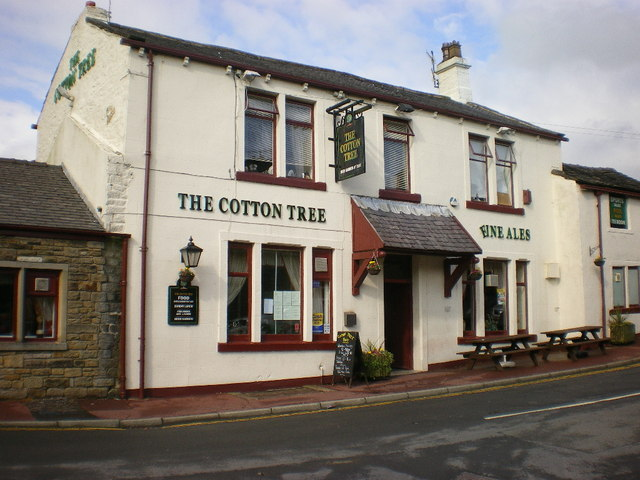
- The Cotton Tree public house, Winewall Road

- Location within Lancashire
- OS grid reference: SD907400
- Civil parish: Trawden Forest
- District: Pendle
- Shire county: Lancashire
- Region: North West
- Country: England
- Sovereign state: United Kingdom
- Post town: COLNE
- Postcode district: BB8
- Dialling code: 01282
- Police: Lancashire
- Fire: Lancashire
- Ambulance: North West
- UK Parliament: Pendle

Cottontree and Winewall are two hamlets situated in the civil parish of Trawden Forest in Pendle, Lancashire. They are adjacent to one other and located between the towns of Colne and Trawden. Cottontree is generally situated in the valley along the road that connects the two towns. Winewall is generally on the hillside overlooking Cottontree. The road that runs between Cottontree and Winewall connects to Laneshaw Bridge, Wycoller and is an alternative route to Trawden.

Until 2001 Winewall had one of England's last Inghamite chapels.

== See also ==
- Listed buildings in Trawden Forest
