= Listed buildings in Yate and Pickup Bank =

Yate and Pickup Bank is a civil parish in Blackburn with Darwen, Lancashire, England. It contains three buildings that are recorded in the National Heritage List for England as designated listed buildings, all of which are listed at Grade II. This grade is the lowest of the three gradings given to listed buildings and is applied to "buildings of national importance and special interest". The parish contains the settlements of Pickup Bank and Bank Fold, and part of the village of Belthorn, but is otherwise rural. The listed buildings consist of two farmhouses, and a Sunday school that was later converted into a chapel.

== Buildings ==
Name and location	Photograph	Date	Notes
Sniddleholme, Bank Fold; 53.71274°N 2.42957°W	—	1656	A sandstone farmhouse with a stone-slate roof. It has two storeys and three bays with a barn continuing to the left. On the north face is a porch with a moulded Tudor arched doorway, above which is a datestone. The windows are mullioned.
Bank Fold Farmhouse; 53.71387°N 2.42933°W	—	1765	The building consists of a farmhouse combined with a cottage, a barn, and a stable. The house and cottage have two storeys. The cottage on the left has one bay, the house is in two, and the barn on the right has three bays. The house has a symmetrical front containing a central doorway with a fanlight. Some of the windows are sashes, and one is mullioned. The barn has two wagon entrances, and a projecting outshut forming the stable, which incorporates a datestone.
Sunday School, Pickup Bank; 53.70116°N 2.41638°W		1835	The Sunday school was converted into a chapel in 1860. It is in sandstone with a slate roof, it has a rectangular plan, and is in a single-story. There are round-headed windows on the sides with imposts and keystones, and similar windows at the rear. The entrance front contains a round-headed doorway with a fanlight, above which is an inscribed plaque containing the date.
