= Listed buildings in Trawden Forest =

Trawden Forest is a civil parish in Pendle, Lancashire, England. It contains 39 listed buildings that are recorded in the National Heritage List for England. Of these, six are at Grade II*, the middle grade, and the others are at Grade II, the lowest grade. The parish contains the village of Trawden and the hamlets of Cottontree, Winewall, and Wycoller, and is otherwise completely rural. Most of the listed buildings are houses and associated structures, farmhouses and farm buildings. Six bridges are listed, two clapper bridges, a packhorse bridge, two medieval or post-medieval bridges, and a 19th-century road bridge. The other listed buildings include a group of medieval stones, the ruins of a former large house, and a public house.

== Key ==
Grade	Criteria
II*	Particularly important buildings of more than special interest
II	Buildings of national importance and special interest

== Buildings ==
Name and location	Photograph	Date	Notes	Grade
Bank House Bridge; 53.84634°N 2.09896°W		Unknown	A single-span clapper bridge crossing Wycoller Beck. It is in millstone grit and is supported at each end by stone piers. The bridge is also a scheduled monument.	II*
Clapper Bridge; 53.84899°N 2.10427°W		Unknown	The clapper bridge that crosses Wycoller Beck is also known as The Hall Bridge or Weavers' Bridge. It consists of two stone slabs carrying a stone pier, and is also supported by a concrete pier. The bridge is also a scheduled monument.	II*
Remains of Vaccary Walls; 53.85068°N 2.09869°W		Medieval (possible)	These consist of large slabs of stones, many of which have been removed, that formed the boundaries of field enclosures.	II
Midge Hole Bridge; 53.83497°N 2.12669°W		Medieval or post-medieval	The bridge carries a track over Trawden Brook. It is in rubble stone, and consists of a single segmental arch, springing on one side from a bedrock slab, and on the other from the stream bed. The bridge has wedge-shaped voussoirs, and a slightly splayed parapet.	II
Seghole Bridge; 53.83469°N 2.12802°W		Medieval or post-medieval	The bridge carries a track over a tributary of Trawden Brook, and it was extended before 1844. It is in rubble stone, and consists of a single segmental arch with voussoirs.	II
Wycoller Hall remains 53.84908°N 2.10384°W		1596	The roofless ruins of a former large stone house that had been extended at least five times. There is a two-storey hall with a twelve-light mullioned window, a large inglenook with a stone bench, and two doorways, one with a dated shield in a spandrel. The ruin is also a scheduled monument.	II*
Pack Horse Bridge; 53.84942°N 2.10427°W		17th century or earlier	The packhorse bridge is in stone, and crosses Wycoller Beck. It consists of two segmental arches with voussoirs and a low parapet. The bridge is also a scheduled monument.	II*
5 and 6 Hill Top; 53.84531°N 2.14175°W		Early 17th century	Originally a farmhouse, later converted into two cottages. The building is in stone with a stone-slate roof, and has two storeys and an L-shaped plan. There is a doorway with a four-centred head. Most of the windows have been altered, but there is one remaining three-light mullioned window.	II
Dent Howe Farmhouse; 53.84552°N 2.14131°W		Early 17th century	The house is in stone with quoins and a stone-slate roof. It has two storeys and a T-shaped plan. The windows are mullioned, and on the left return is a doorway with a Tudor arched head. Inside is an original stone spiral staircase.	II
Wycoller Cottage; 53.84937°N 2.10476°W		Early 17th century	The house was extended later in the century. It is in stone with a stone-slate roof with two storeys, and at the rear is a single-story extension. The windows are mullioned, and the doorway has a plain surround.	II
Barn, Wycoller Hall; 53.84873°N 2.10336°W		1630s (probable)	Originally a barn, then the coach house of Wycoller Hall, converted into a visitor centre in 2005. It is in stone with a stone-slate roof. On the front are a mullioned window, and a doorway flanked by arched entrances with keystones and voussoirs. The interior of the barn is aisled with five bays.	II
Far Wanless Farmhouse; 53.84246°N 2.12898°W	—	17th century	A stone house with a stone-slate roof, in two storeys and three bays, and with a gabled rear wing. There are two doorways, one with chamfered jambs and a Tudor arched head, and the other with pilasters, an entablature, and a segmental pediment. The ground floor windows have hood moulds. In the rear wing is a stepped five-light window.	II
Fold Farmhouse; 53.85637°N 2.13540°W		17th century	A stone house with quoins and a stone-slate roof in two storeys. The windows are mullioned, and there is a single-storey porch with a Tudor arched head. Above the porch is a moulded recess.	II
Laitre Hills Cottage; 53.85053°N 2.10542°W		17th century	A farmhouse to which a bay was added in the 18th century. It is in stone with quoins and a stone-slate roof. Some of the windows are mullioned, and adjacent to the doorway are mounting stones.	II
Lowlands Farmhouse; 53.85114°N 2.10577°W	—	17th century	The farmhouse is in rendered stone with a stone-slate roof in two storeys. The windows are mullioned, some containing sashes. On the left return is a single-storey porch with chamfered jambs and a four-centred arch.	II
New Laith Farmhouse; 53.84110°N 2.13878°W	—	17th century	The house is in stone with a stone-slate roof, in two storeys. The windows, some of which have been altered, are mullioned, and there is a stair window at the rear.	II
Barn, New Laith Farm; 53.84103°N 2.13891°W	—	17th century	The barn, attached to the farmhouse, is in stone with a stone-slate roof. It has a projecting porch, and a blocked doorway that has a large lintel with a chamfered elliptical-arched hood. The interior is aisled, and has four bays.	II
Nichol House Farmhouse, cottage and barn 53.84545°N 2.14088°W		17th century (probable)	The house, cottage and barn are in one range, they are all in stone, the cottage and barn dating from the 18th century. The house has an L-shaped plan, a chamfered door with a semicircular head, mullioned windows with semicircular heads, and sash windows. Both the house and the barn have quoins, and the barn has a cart entry with a segmental head.	II
Old Joseph's Farmhouse and garden wall 53.84488°N 2.14097°W	—	17th century	A stone house with a stone-slate roof in two storeys. The windows are mullioned, with some removed, and there is a lean-to porch. The garden wall at the rear has a ball finial, and contains two doorways, one blocked, two blocked windows, one with mullions, and a panel decorated with a dragon crest.	II
Thistleholme; 53.85094°N 2.10532°W	—	17th century (probable)	A house and barn in stone with quoins and a stone-slate roof. The house has two storeys, and contains mullioned windows with semicircular heads. The doorway has a four-centred arched head and chamfered jambs. The barn to the right, dating probably from the 18th century, has been converted and integrated into the house.	II
Winewall House and Spergarth Cottage; 53.85609°N 2.13545°W		Mid 17th century	The house and cottage are in sandstone with a stone-slate roof. They have two storeys and a T-shaped plan, consisting of a main range and a cross wing. Some of the windows are mullioned, and others are casements.	II
Wycoller House; 53.84952°N 2.10497°W	—	Mid 17th century	The house is in stone with a slate roof in two storeys. On the back are mullioned windows, with some mullions lost, and two recent doorways and a porch. On the front is a doorway with a Tudor arched head, and the other openings date from the 19th century.	II
Hill Top Farmhouse and barn 53.85635°N 2.13487°W		1661	The farmhouse and barn have been converted into four dwellings. The building is in stone with a stone-slate roof. The former house has quoins, mullioned windows, and a chamfered doorway. On the left return is a single-storey gabled porch with a re-set datestone. In the former barn is a segmental arch.	II
Higher Oakenbank; 53.83094°N 2.13114°W	—	Late 17th century	A farmhouse that was extended in the late 18th century. It is in gritstone with a stone-slate roof and two storeys. There are quoins in the original part, and both parts have mullioned windows.	II
Pierson's Farmhouse; 53.84963°N 2.10507°W		Late 17th century	A stone house with quoins, a plinth, and a stone-slate roof, in two storeys. On the front is a two-storey canted porch containing a doorway with a moulded ogee head, above which is a bay window. The windows are mullioned. and inside the house is an inglenook.	II*
Winewall Farmhouse; 53.85610°N 2.13606°W		1690	A row of three houses with the farmhouse in the centre, in sandstone with a stone-slate roof and in two storeys. On the front is a two-storey porch that has a moulded surround, and a decorated lintel. Above the doorway is a Venetian-style window flanked by fluted columns that have capitals with Ionic features, and a stepped entablature. The other windows are mullioned, some of which have been lost.	II
Wycoller Beck Farm; 53.85479°N 2.12292°W		Late 17th or early 18th century	The farmhouse is in stone with s stone-slate roof and in two storeys. The windows are mullioned, and there is a moulded dripstone on the ground floor. There is a central gabled porch, and a doorway with a deep chamfered lintel.	II
Grain kiln and stable 53.85590°N 2.13505°W		c. 1700	The building is in gritstone with quoins and a stone-slate roof. It has one storey, a partial basement, and three bays. The building contains doorways, a cart entrance, blocked ventilation slits, a basement door, and an owl hole. Inside is a fire-chamber, and a grill of stone slats.	II*
Middle Beardshaw Head Farmhouse and barn 53.83951°N 2.14626°W	—	1739	The house and barn are in stone with a stone-slate roof. The house has two storeys, with a four- and a five-light mullioned window in each floor, and a later gabled porch. At the rear is a mullioned and transomed stair window with a semicircular head and Gothic tracery. The barn has two doorways, one large with a segmental arch, and a mullioned window.	II
Bell turret, Trawden Hall; 53.84597°N 2.14270°W		1747	The bell turret is in stone, and stands on a three-sided pedestal. It takes the form of a circular temple, with six Ionic columns on a stone base, surmounted by a canopy with a plain frieze, a dome, and a ball finial.	II
Barn, Lowlands Farm; 53.85099°N 2.10555°W	—	18th century	The barn was altered in the 20th century and converted into a house. It is in limestone with a Welsh slate roof. On the north side is a cat entrance, now glazed. The other windows and the doors are modern.	II
Seghole Farmhouse; 53.83489°N 2.12842°W		Mid 18th century	The house is in gritstone with quoins and a stone-slate roof. There are two storeys and three bays, with a rear outshut to the first bay. There is a central 20th-century porch with a re-used datestone, and some of the windows are mullioned.	II
Bottoms Farmhouse; 53.83650°N 2.12888°W	—	Late 18th century	A stone house with a stone-slate roof in two storeys. The windows are mullioned, and the doorway has a plain surround.	II
Yeoman Hey and Dent Cottage; 53.84520°N 2.14102°W		Late 18th century	A pair of back-to-back cottages in stone with a stone-slate roof, in three storeys. On the front is a blocked doorway with a triangular hood and an inserted window. To the right of this is a sash window, and in the upper floors the windows are mullioned. To the right is a two-storey extension.	II
Sun Inn; 53.84459°N 2.13803°W		1793	A public house in stone with a stone-slate roof in two storeys. The windows are sashes with mullions. There are three doorways, one with a fanlight, and another with a moulded pediment.	II
Stanstead Cottages; 53.84695°N 2.13129°W	—	c. 1800	A row of three weavers' cottages in gritstone with a stone-slate roof. They have three storeys, and each cottage has two bays. All the windows are modern replacements.	II
Cottage east of Wycoller House; 53.84964°N 2.10455°W	—	Early 19th century	The cottage is in stone with a stone-slate roof in two storeys. The doorway on the gabled front has a plain surround.	II
Winewall Bridge; 53.85684°N 2.14052°W		Early 19th century	The bridge carries Rosley Street over Colne Water. It is in stone and consists of a single segmental arch with voussoirs. It has a plain parapet, with coping rising to a peak over the arch, and the parapet continuing as a boundary wall.	II
House adjoining Wycoller Farm; 53.84970°N 2.10515°W	—	19th century	A stone house with a stone-slate roof in two storeys with a symmetrical front. There are two sash windows in each floor, and a central doorway with a cornice.	II
