= Trawden Brook =

River in Lancashire, England

Coordinates: 53.836134°N 2.127606°W

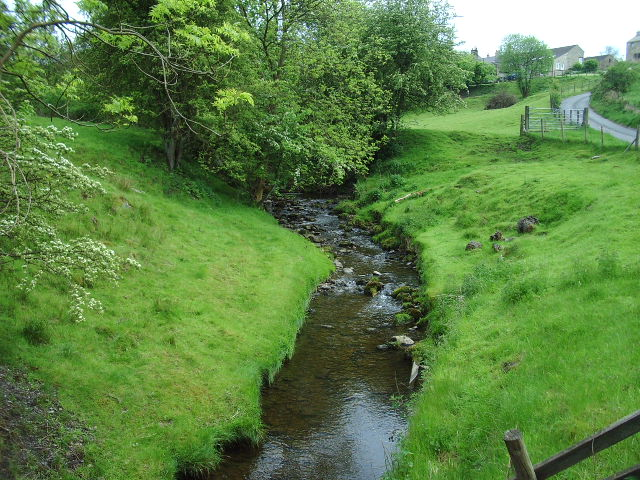
Trawden Brook at Hollin Hall

Trawden Brook is a minor river in Lancashire, England. It is 3.48 miles (5.6 km) long and has a catchment area of 4.40 square miles (11.4 km^{2}).

Rising on Red Spa Moor as Will Moor Clough, the river becomes Trawden Brook after the confluence with Round Hole Beck at Tongue End. Shortly after it collects the stream from Lumb Spout waterfall and runs on past Hollin Hall to enter the village of Trawden at the Bottoms Bridge where it is met by Beardshaw Beck. It then continues north flowing into Colne Water next to Trawden Road Bridge in Cottontree near Colne.

The name possibly originates from a contraction of the Old English words trog (trough) and denu (valley), an appropriate name for the river valley. Brook (OE broc) is a common name for a stream, most often found in southern and central England.
