= Bentgate =

Bentgate or Bent Gate may refer to several places in the United Kingdom:

- Bentgate, Rochdale, an area of Newhey
- Bent Gate, a suburb of Haslingden, Lancashire
  - Bentgate, home of Haslingden Cricket Club
