= Acre, Lancashire =

Village in Lancashire, England

Coordinates: 53.720°N 2.324°W

Acre
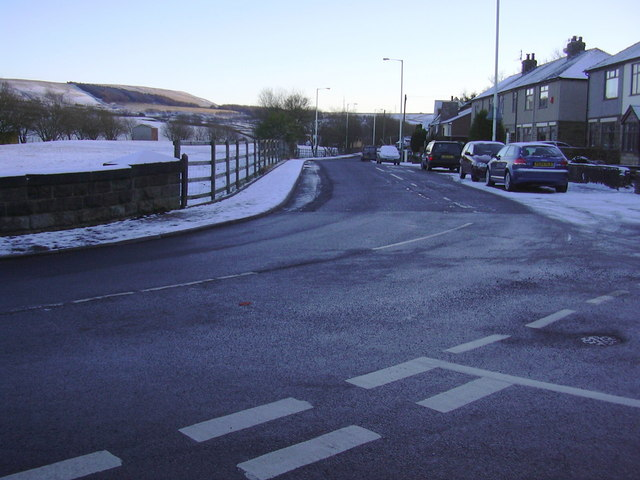
- Rising Bridge Road in 2009

- Location within Lancashire
- OS grid reference: SD786249
- District: Rossendale
- Shire county: Lancashire
- Region: North West
- Country: England
- Sovereign state: United Kingdom
- Post town: ROSSENDALE
- Postcode district: BB4
- Dialling code: 01706
- Police: Lancashire
- Fire: Lancashire
- Ambulance: North West
- UK Parliament: Hyndburn

Acre is a Victorian village situated along the A56 Blackburn Road between the village of Rising Bridge and the town of Haslingden in the Borough of Rossendale, Lancashire, about one mile north of Haslingden town centre. It was founded in 1861.

There are 2 major walking trails, the Acre Heritage Trail and Acre Boundary Trail.
