= Emmott Hall =

Demolished county house in Lancashire, England

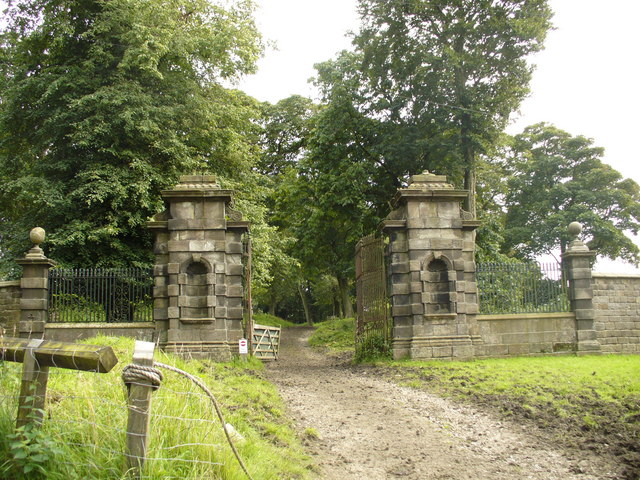
- Gates to Emmott Hall

- Location within the Borough of Pendle

General information
- Status: Demolished
- Type: Country house
- Location: Laneshawbridge, Colne, Lancashire, England
- Coordinates: 53.8600°N 2.1150°W
- Completed: 16th or early 17th century
- Demolished: 1967

Technical details
- Floor count: 2

Emmott Hall was a country house in the village of Laneshawbridge, Colne, Lancashire, England.

It stood on high ground two and a half miles east of Colne near the junction of the River Laneshaw and the Hullown Beck, facing south towards the Wycoller Valley. The main part of the house consisted of two-storey west and north wings built in the 16th or early 17th century, which had been re-fronted in ashlar stone, together with other alterations, in the 18th century.

Within the grounds of the hall was the Hullown Well or Saint's Well, a square stone structure, probably a baptismal pool, with dressed stonework measuring 18 feet long by 16 feet wide and 10 feet deep with 14 steps descending into the water. Although in poor condition, it can still be viewed. A 7 foot high medieval cross-shaft, (the Emmott Cross or Touchcross) used to stand close to the well, but was moved to Colne churchyard when the hall was demolished.

== History ==
The Emmott family had lived in the Laneshawbridge area for some time, probably since the time of the Norman conquest. A medieval house had stood on the site since at least 1600 and possibly the 13th century.

The property eventually passed down to Christopher Emmott, a successful London cloth merchant. He modernised the existing house in 1737 to give it a Georgian appearance and made several extensions. On his death in 1745 the property passed to his nephew, Richard Wainhouse, who changed his surname by Parliamentary Order to Emmott. Richard died in 1761, leaving the estate to his son, also Richard. Richard junior died unmarried and the property devolved to his nephew George Emmott Green, who then changed his name to George Emmott Green-Emmott.

On George Green-Emmott's death in 1876 the estate passed to his son Walter Egerton John Green-Emmott, who had married Kathleen Vereker in 1896. After her death in 1939 the hall was used as a military barracks, after which it was left empty and deteriorated beyond repair. It was demolished in 1967. The estate is still in the hands of the family, the current proprietor is Peter Douglas Edward Emmott Mackellar. The family no longer reside in Lancashire.

The estate is now Hullown Farm, a working rare breeds farm and visitor centre with many associated leisure and tourism activities and the Hallown Fishing estate.
