= Balladen =

Hamlet in Lancashire, England

Coordinates: 53.690°N 2.289°W

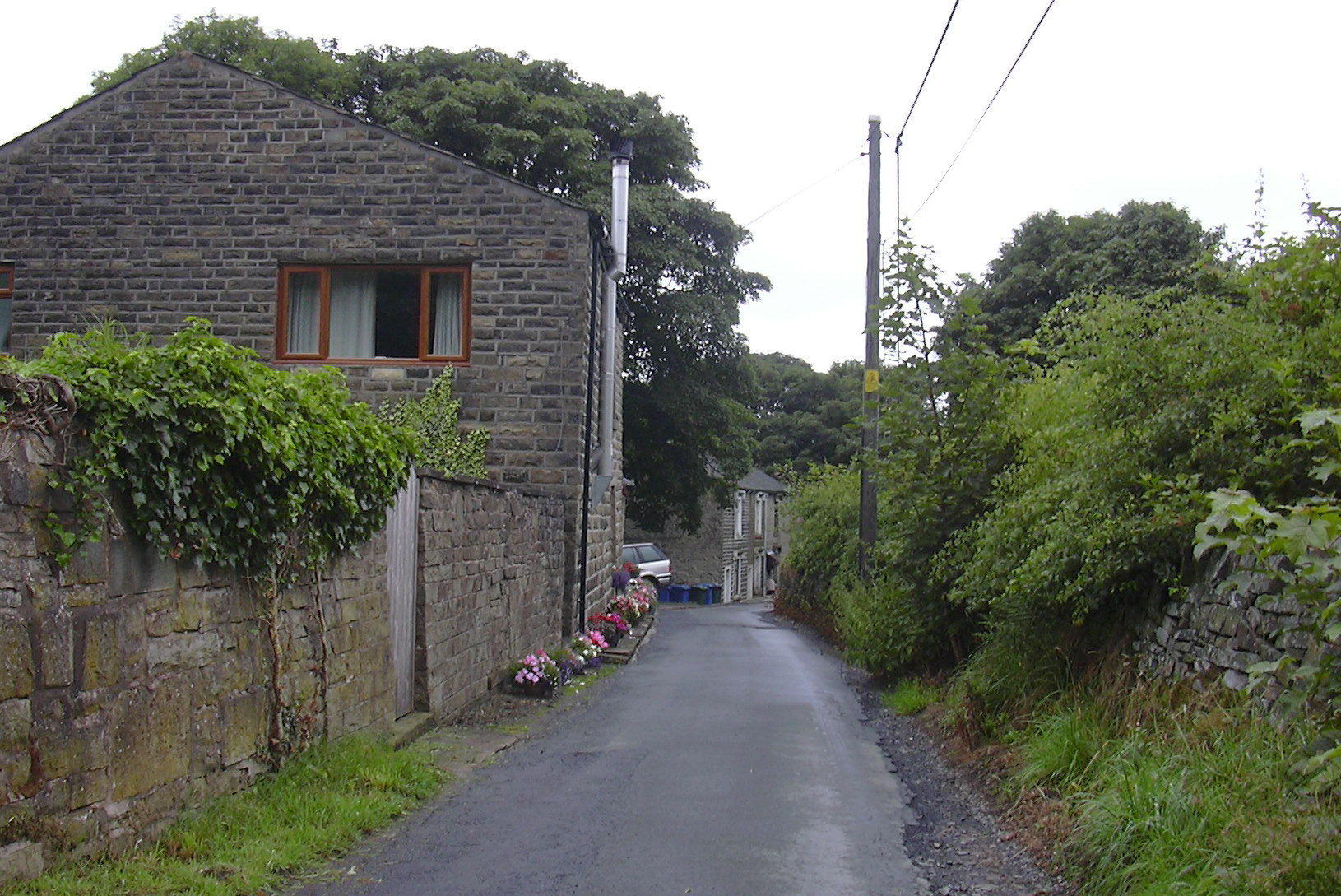
- Lomas Lane in 2010

- Location within Rossendale Location within Lancashire
- OS grid reference: SD809215
- District: Rossendale
- Shire county: Lancashire
- Region: North West
- Country: England
- Sovereign state: United Kingdom
- Post town: ROSSENDALE
- Postcode district: BB4
- Dialling code: 01706
- Police: Lancashire
- Fire: Lancashire
- Ambulance: North West
- UK Parliament: Rossendale and Darwen

Balladen is a hamlet in Rossendale, Lancashire, England. It lies adjacent south of the town of Rawtenstall and is served by Lomas Lane. It was historically agricultural and then industrial, and is now almost exclusively residential.
