= Listed buildings in Laneshaw Bridge =

Laneshaw Bridge is a civil parish in Pendle, Lancashire, England. It contains ten listed buildings that are recorded in the National Heritage List for England. All of the listed buildings are designated at Grade II, the lowest of the three grades, which is applied to "buildings of national importance and special interest". The parish contains the village of Laneshaw Bridge and the surrounding countryside. Most of the listed buildings are houses, farmhouses and farm buildings. The other listed buildings consist of a boundary stone, a public house, and a bridge.

== Buildings ==
Name and location	Photograph	Date	Notes
Hanging stone 53.84071°N 2.04518°W		Medieval	Also known as Water Sheddles Cross, it consists of a large millstone grit block that was a boundary marker. The stone leans at an angle of about 45 degrees, and is carved on the top with a cross and on the side with an inscription. It is also a scheduled monument.
Lower Emmott House; 53.86081°N 2.11270°W	—	c. 1600	The house, which was extended in the 19th century, is in gritstone with a stone-slate roof. It has a T-shaped plan, and is in two storeys. The front range dates from the 19th century and has three bays, mainly sash windows, and an Ionic porch with a plain entablature The doorway has a moulded surround, a Tudor arched head, and a fanlight. The wing to the right is earlier, in four bays and with mullioned windows.
Lower and Higher Lane Head; 53.86569°N 2.12735°W	—	Early 17th century	Originally a farmhouse. later divided into two dwellings, it is in gritstone with quoins and a stone-slate roof. The building has a T-shaped plan, with a main range and a cross wing. There are two storeys, and each range has two bays. The windows are mullioned. The gabled porch contains a Tudor arched doorway.
Rye Flat Farmhouse and barn 53.86221°N 2.11791°W	—	Late 17th or early 18th century (probable)	The house and barn are in stone with a stone-slate roof. The house has two storeys, and a doorway with a moulded Tudor arched head. The windows are mullioned, those in the upper floor having four lights and semicircular heads. The barn to the right has a doorway with a plain surround. (Note: Street View in April 2009 shows that the barn has been converted for domestic use.)
Far Salter Syke Farmhouse; 53.87125°N 2.13179°W	—	1710	A rendered house with a slate roof in two storeys. Most of the mullions have been removed from the windows. On the front is a gabled porch, and the doorway has a chamfered surround, a small square niche to the right, and a moulded datestone above.
Emmott Hall Cottage; 53.86122°N 2.10917°W	—	1737	Originally stables, later converted for domestic use, the house is in stone with a stone-slate roof. It has a U-shaped plan, with a main range and two gabled wings. Some windows have retained their mullions, and the doorway has a decorated lintel. On the gables are finials, and the left gable end contains an oval window.
Emmott Hall gateway 53.86093°N 2.11214°W		1737 (probable)	The gateway consists of sandstone gate piers, side piers, and walls, and wrought iron gates. All the piers are square with buttresses ending in volutes. Each has a plinth, intermittent rustication, and cornice with a gadrooned base, and a ball finial decorated with an abacus. In addition the gate piers have Doric pilasters on the inner sides, and rusticated niches on the outer sides.
Herders Inn; 53.84778°N 2.08321°W		18th century	This was originally a herder's house, and became a public house in 1860. It is in stone with a stone-slate roof, and has two storeys and a symmetrical front. In the centre is a modern gabled porch with a semicircular arched window above. The other windows are stepped and mullioned. On the sides are lean-to extensions.
7–16 Carriers Row; 53.86119°N 2.11911°W	—	Late 18th century	A terrace of ten stone cottages with a stone-slate roof, in two storeys with nos. 7 and 15 projecting forward. The windows are sashes. The windows in the lower floor have two lights that were originally separated by mullions, some of which have been removed. The doorways have plain surrounds, other than nos. 7 and 15 that have a frieze and a pediment carried on moulded consoles.
Laneshaw Bridge; 53.86221°N 2.11843°W		Early 19th century	Also known as Royd Bridge, it carries School Lane across the River Laneshaw. The bridge is in stone, and consists of a single segmental arch with voussoirs. The parapet has coping that rises to a peak, it bears an inscription, and continues as a boundary wall.

== Notes and references ==
Notes

Citations

Sources

- Historic England, "Hanging stone, Laneshaw Bridge (1313972)", National Heritage List for England
- Historic England, "Hanging Stone or Watersheddles Cross, Laneshaw Bridge (1009495)", National Heritage List for England
- Historic England, "Lower Emmott House, Laneshaw Bridge (1243837)", National Heritage List for England
- Historic England, "Higher Lane Head Lower Lane Head, Laneshaw Bridge (1073334)", National Heritage List for England
- Historic England, "Rye Flat Farmhouse and attached barn, Laneshaw Bridge (1272943)", National Heritage List for England
- Historic England, "Far Salter Syke Farmhouse, Laneshaw Bridge (1361720)", National Heritage List for England
- Historic England, "Emmott Hall Cottage, Laneshaw Bridge (1243307)", National Heritage List for England
- Historic England, "Emmott Hall gateway, Laneshaw Bridge (1361719)", National Heritage List for England
- Historic England, "Herders Inn, Laneshaw Bridge (1272757)", National Heritage List for England
- Historic England, "Nos. 7–16 Carriers Row, Laneshaw Bridge (1073413)", National Heritage List for England
- Historic England, "Laneshaw Bridge (1073384)", National Heritage List for England
- Historic England, Listed Buildings
