= Bank Fold =

Coordinates: 53.712°N 2.426°W

- Hamlet
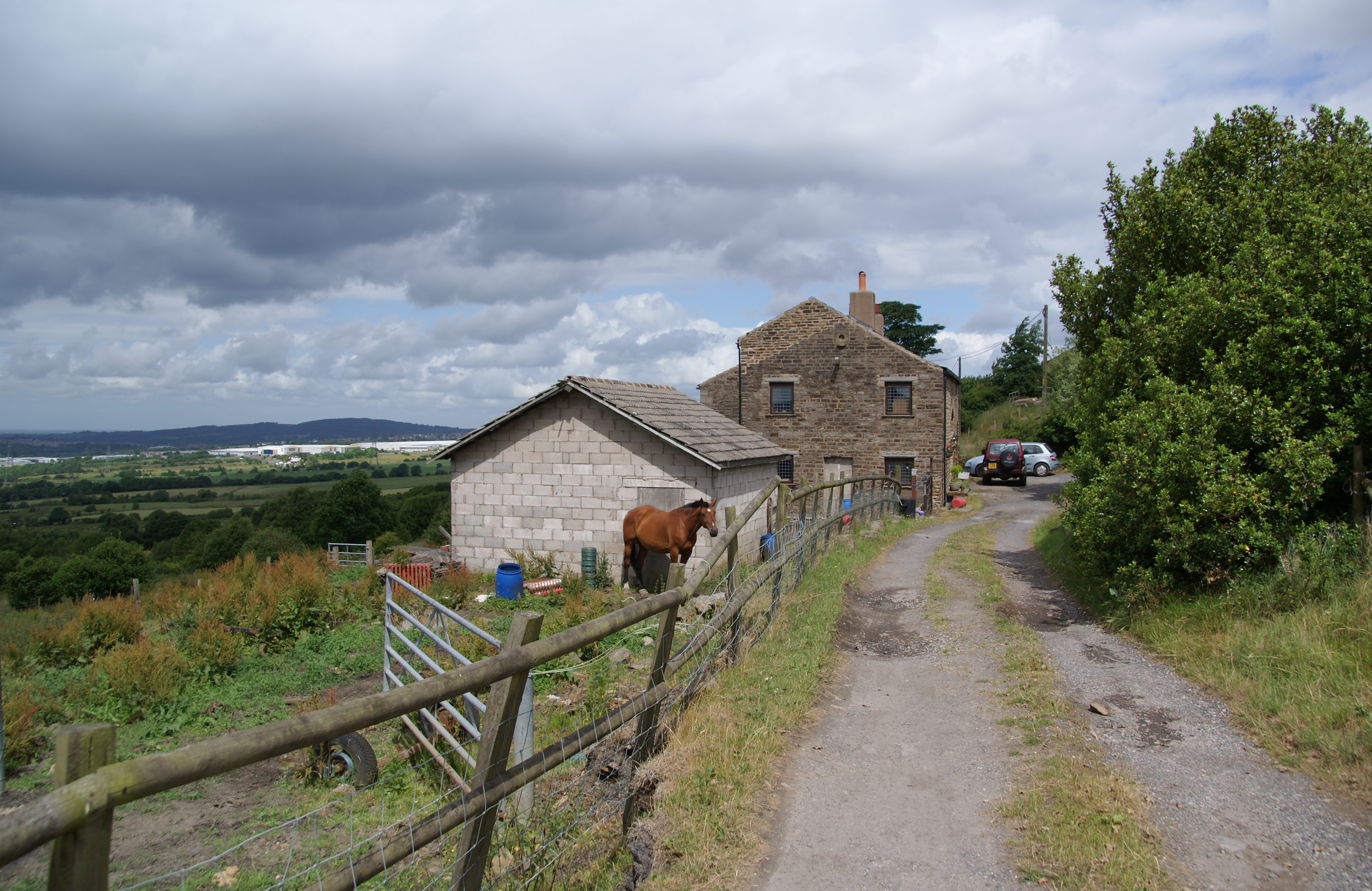
- A smallholding at the bottom end of Bank Fold

- Shown within Blackburn with Darwen Location within Lancashire
- OS grid reference: SD718240
- Civil parish: Yate and Pickup Bank
- Unitary authority: Blackburn with Darwen
- Ceremonial county: Lancashire
- Region: North West
- Country: England
- Sovereign state: United Kingdom
- Post town: DARWEN
- Postcode district: BB3
- Dialling code: 01254
- Police: Lancashire
- Fire: Lancashire
- Ambulance: North West
- UK Parliament: Rossendale and Darwen

Bank Fold is a hamlet near Belthorn in Lancashire, England.
