= Blackamoor, Lancashire =

Village in Lancashire, England

Coordinates: 53.724°N 2.461°W

Blackamoor
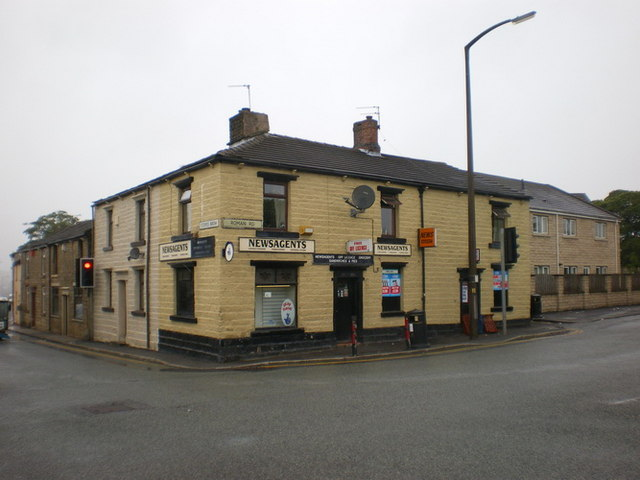
- Corner Shop, Blackamoor (August 2009)

- Shown within Blackburn Shown within Blackburn with Darwen Location within Lancashire
- OS grid reference: SD696254
- Unitary authority: Blackburn with Darwen
- Ceremonial county: Lancashire
- Region: North West
- Country: England
- Sovereign state: United Kingdom
- Post town: BLACKBURN
- Postcode district: BB1
- Dialling code: 01254
- Police: Lancashire
- Fire: Lancashire
- Ambulance: North West
- UK Parliament: Blackburn

Blackamoor is a village in Lancashire, England which is to the south of Blackburn.

It is located on the cross roads between Lower Darwen and Guide where the B6231 crosses the old “Roman Road” from Manchester to Ribchester.
