= Tottleworth =

Hamlet in Lancashire, England

Coordinates: 53.776°N 2.408°W

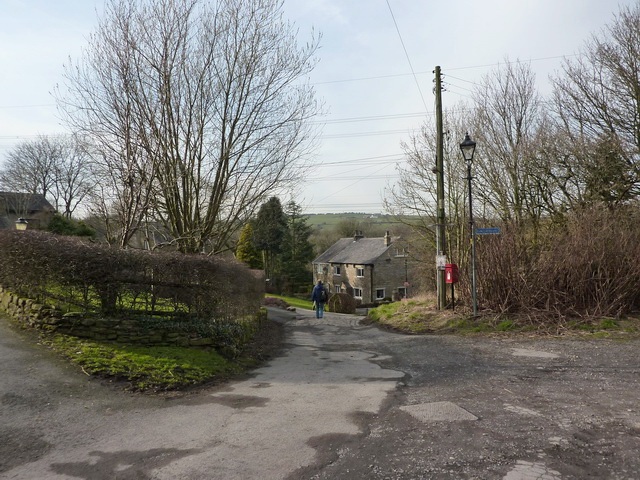
- Tottleworth Road

- Location in Hyndburn Location within Lancashire
- OS grid reference: SD731311
- District: Hyndburn
- Shire county: Lancashire
- Region: North West
- Country: England
- Sovereign state: United Kingdom
- Post town: BLACKBURN
- Postcode district: BB1
- Dialling code: 01254
- Police: Lancashire
- Fire: Lancashire
- Ambulance: North West
- UK Parliament: Hyndburn

Tottleworth is a small hamlet situated between Great Harwood and Rishton in Lancashire, England. It situated close to the confluence of Lidgett and Norden Brooks. In 1925 the hamlet was reported as consisting of 15 houses and one farm. At the same time the spring the houses drew there water from was judged to be highly polluted and was sealed off.
