= Boulsworth Hill =

Hill in Lancashire, England

Coordinates: 53.81663°N 2.10932°W

Boulsworth Hill – Lad Law
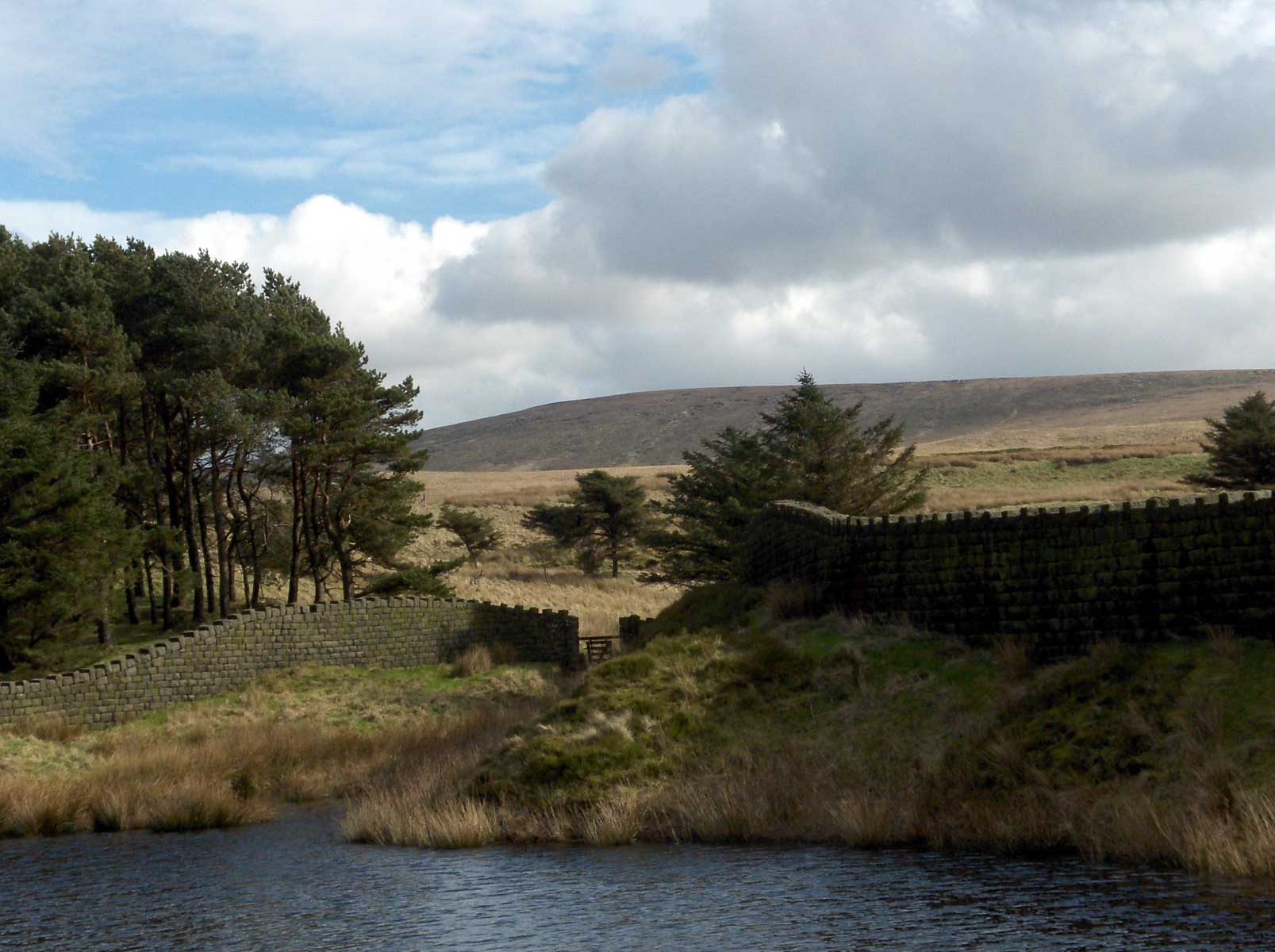
- Boulsworth Hill and the Upper Coldwell Reservoir

Highest point
- Elevation: 1,696 ft (517 m)
- Prominence: 1,060 ft (320 m)
- Parent peak: Kinder Scout
- Listing: Marilyn

Geography
- Location within Lancashire Location within the Borough of Pendle
- Location: Lancashire, England
- Parent range: Pennines
- OS grid: SD929356
- Topo map: OS Explorer OL21

Boulsworth Hill is a large expanse of moorland, the highest point of the South Pennines of south-eastern Lancashire, England, separating the Borough of Pendle from Calderdale.

Its summit, Lad Law, is 1,696 ft (517 m) above sea level, and commands views over Pendle Hill, the Forest of Bowland, the Yorkshire Dales and the South Pennines. On an exceptionally clear day it is possible to see Scafell Pike and Helvellyn to the north, Ferrybridge power station to the east, High Peak to the south and the Big One roller coaster at Blackpool Pleasure Beach to the west. The Brontë Way and the Pendle Way both pass along the slopes of Boulsworth Hill, providing routes of ascent from Nelson and Wycoller. A further possibility is to climb from Trawden, the nearest town to the summit, and it was originally intended that Boulsworth Hill would be a highlight of the Pennine Way, which instead passes to the east of the hill. Following the CRoW Act, Boulsworth Hill can now also be legally climbed from the Yorkshire side, near Hebden Bridge.

The underlying rock is Millstone Grit, which is seen outcropping in several places and forming a steep scarp face along the summit. The hill is covered by acidic grassland, which provide a valuable breeding ground for red grouse, twite, golden plover and other birds.

It lies just inside Lancashire, although the county boundary with the West Yorkshire district of Calderdale passes just a mile to the southeast of Lad Law.
