= Laneshaw Bridge =

Civil parish in England

Coordinates: 53.862°N 2.119°W

Laneshawbridge
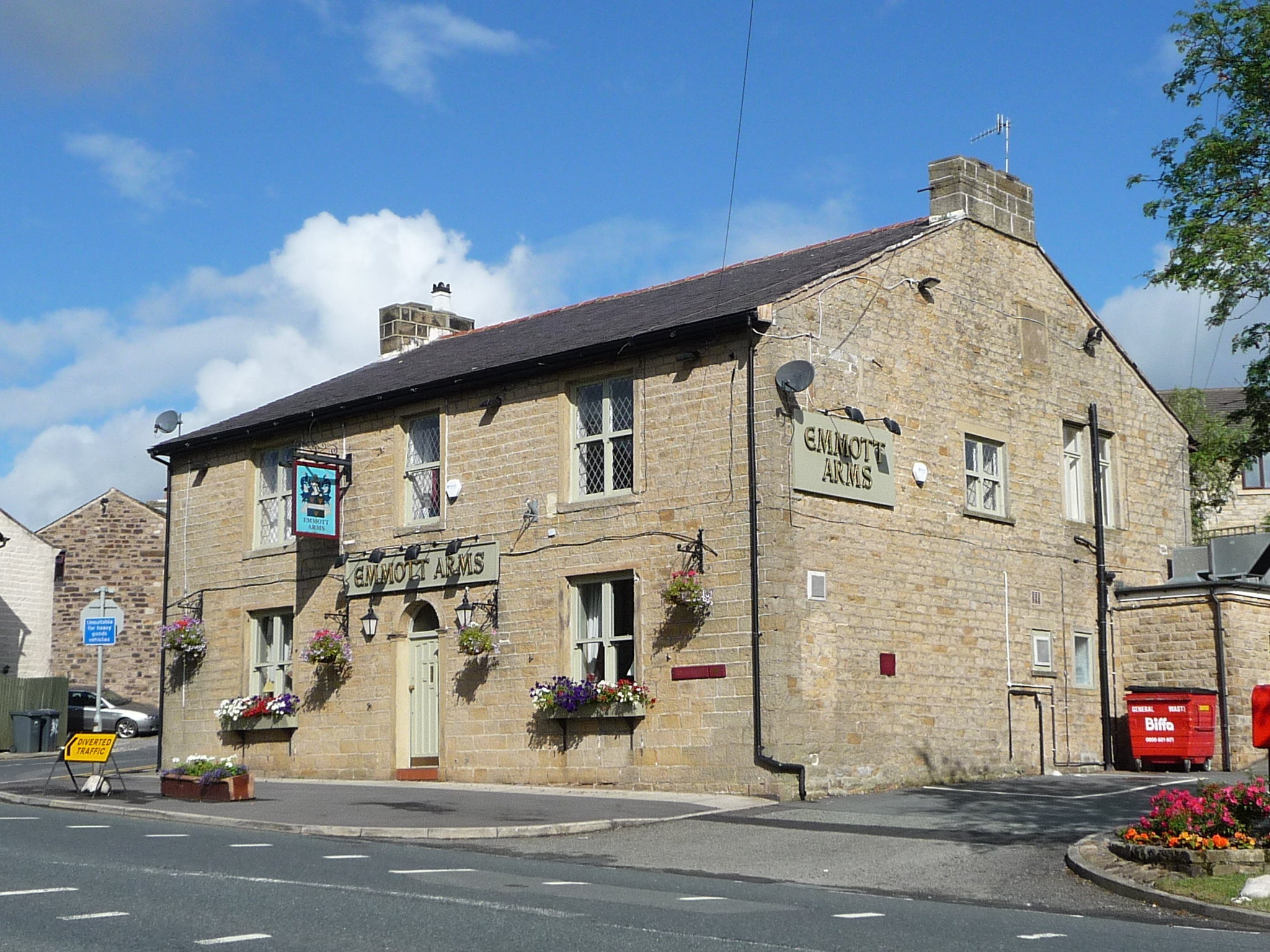
- The Emmott Arms public house

- Location in Pendle Borough Location within Lancashire
- Population: 918 (2011)
- OS grid reference: SD925405
- Civil parish: Laneshaw Bridge
- District: Pendle
- Shire county: Lancashire
- Region: North West
- Country: England
- Sovereign state: United Kingdom
- Post town: COLNE
- Postcode district: BB8
- Dialling code: 01282
- Police: Lancashire
- Fire: Lancashire
- Ambulance: North West
- UK Parliament: Pendle and Clitheroe

Laneshawbridge (otherwise Laneshaw Bridge) is a village and civil parish in the Borough of Pendle in England. The population of the civil parish at the 2011 census was 918. It is to the east of Colne in Lancashire and is the easternmost settlement in Lancashire on the main road route, before the North Yorkshire border.

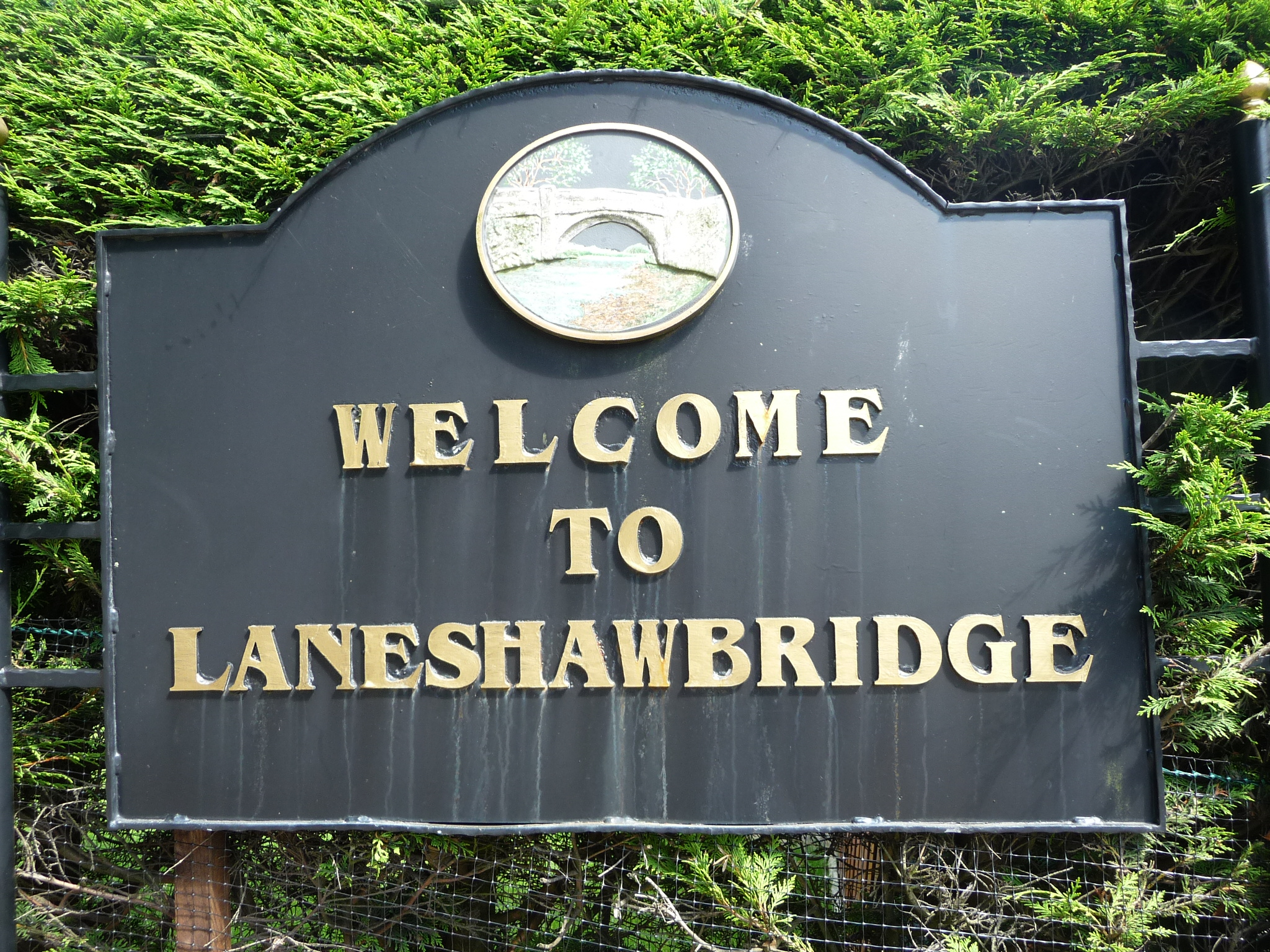
The village name as one word

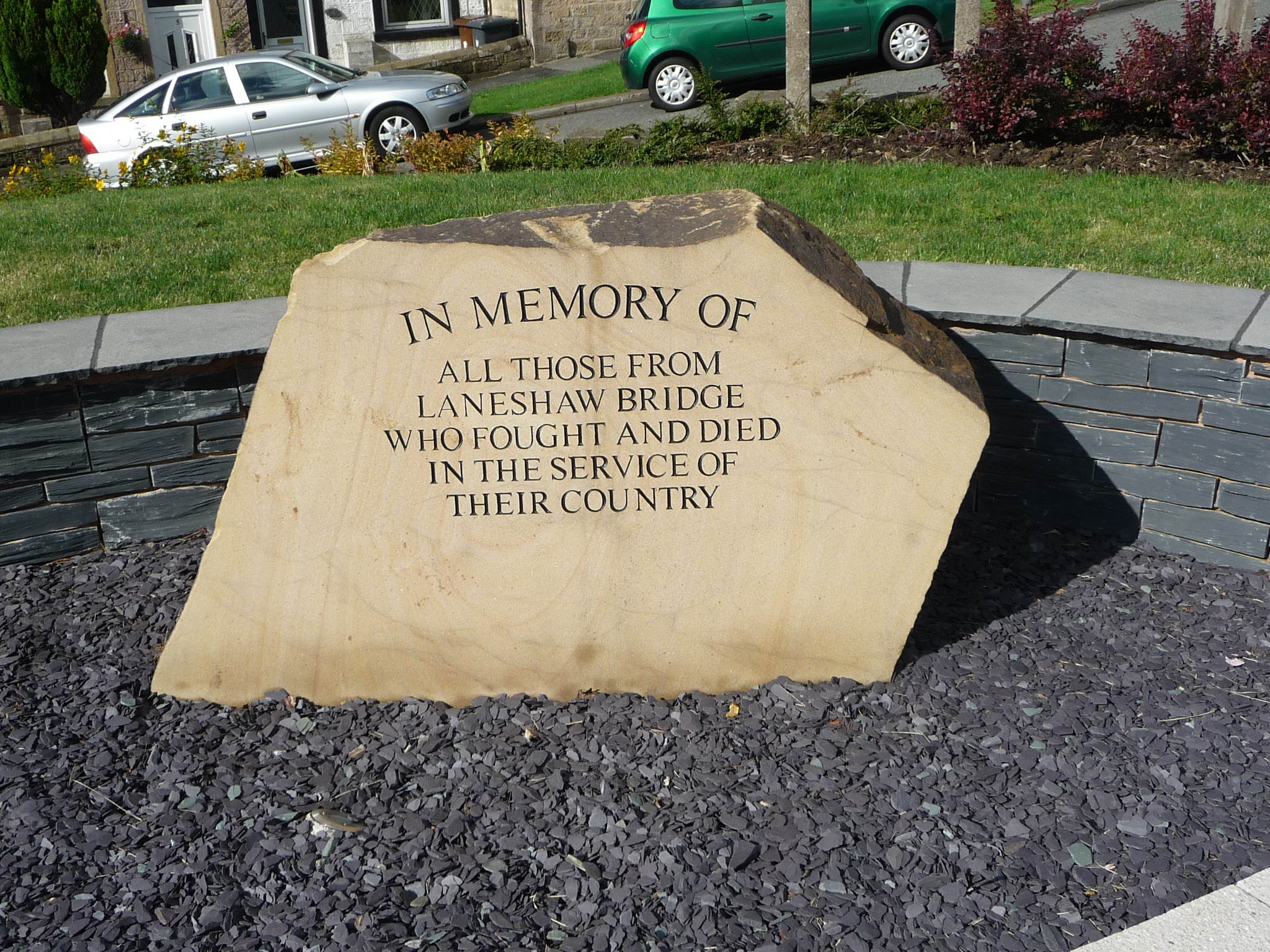
The village name as two words

The roots of Laneshawbridge, or "The Brig" as it is affectionately known by the locals, date from the time of William the Conqueror, when he gave some land to the Emmott family, which they still own. It is thought that the family were given land for their military support, and founded a hamlet known as "Eamot" which later became Laneshawbridge. The family resided at Emmott Hall, the first of which dated back to 1310, but it was to be modified, rebuilt and finally demolished in 1967.

Near to where the hall stood is Emmott House, which was a coach house to the main hall and dates back to 1737. In the 1990s, the old boating lake was dug out to create Hullow'n Fishery, and this is run by the Choyce family for sporting purposes.

Next to the lake is Hullow'n Well which has its own history. It has been claimed that this the Eamot where in AD 926 King Athelstan confirmed a treaty of peace between the Welsh, Scots and Northumbrians.

The Emmotts owned much of the village, and provided a school, as well as St Andrew's Church, both of which are now residential properties.

It would also appear that the family had a public house which was probably used as a shooting lodge. The first village inn, possibly called "the Rochester", is rumoured to be what is today Rye Flatt Farmhouse, which has been restored as the village's only bed and breakfast. In the centre of the village stands the Emmott Arms public house. A trip up Emmott Lane will take you past the village park, around which the village is built, to the Alma Inn.

The village of Trawden is 2 miles (3 km) to the south west and the historic village of Wycoller is 2 miles (3 km) to the south.

The civil parish was created in 1992, from part of the Unparished area that before 1974 had been the Municipal Borough of Colne.

== See also ==
- Listed buildings in Laneshaw Bridge
