= Ronald Haworth =

English footballer

Ronald Haworth (10 March 1901 – October 1973) was an English footballer. His regular position was as a forward. He was born in Lower Darwen, Lancashire. He played for Manchester United, Hull City, and Darwen.
