= Mill Hill, Blackburn with Darwen =

Coordinates: 53°44′01″N 2°30′12″W

Mill Hill
- Population: 5,950
- OS grid reference: SD675265
- Unitary authority: Blackburn with Darwen
- Ceremonial county: Lancashire
- Region: North West
- Country: England
- Sovereign state: United Kingdom
- Post town: BLACKBURN
- Postcode district: BB2
- Dialling code: 01254
- Police: Lancashire
- Fire: Lancashire
- Ambulance: North West
- UK Parliament: Blackburn

Mill Hill is a suburb and electoral ward of Blackburn, in the unitary authority of Blackburn with Darwen, within the ceremonial county of Lancashire, England. It lies to the southwest of Blackburn town centre and is primarily residential in nature, with a mix of Victorian terraces and more modern housing developments.

== History ==
Mill Hill developed during the Industrial Revolution, particularly in the 19th century, as a result of the expansion of the textile industry in Blackburn. The area takes its name from the mills that once dominated the landscape, many of which have now been demolished or repurposed.

== Governance ==
Mill Hill forms part of the Blackburn with Darwen unitary authority and is represented in the UK Parliament as part of the Blackburn constituency.

== Transport ==
Mill Hill railway station is situated on the East Lancashire Line and provides regular services to Blackburn, Preston, and Colne. The area is also served by several bus routes, offering connections to the wider borough.

== Education ==
Mill Hill has a number of primary schools and lies within the catchment area for secondary schools in Blackburn. The nearby Blackburn College also offers further and higher education opportunities.

== Demographics ==
As of the 2021 Census, Mill Hill ward had a population of approximately 5,950.

== Landmarks and amenities ==
Mill Hill has a local shopping area along New Chapel Street, including small independent shops, takeaways, and convenience stores. The area is also home to several churches, parks, and community centres.

== See also ==
- Blackburn
- Blackburn with Darwen
