= BB postcode area =

Postcode area within the United Kingdom

Blackburn
- Postcode area
- Coordinates: 53.785°N 2.335°W
- Country: United Kingdom
- Postcode area: BB
- Postcode area name: Blackburn
- Post towns: 9
- Postcode districts: 15
- Postcode sectors: 79
- Postcodes (live): 13,200
- Postcodes (total): 18,833
- Statistics as at May 2020

The BB postcode area, also known as the Blackburn postcode area, is a group of thirteen postcode districts in north-west England, within nine post towns. These cover east Lancashire, including Blackburn, Burnley, Accrington, Barnoldswick, Clitheroe, Colne, Darwen, Nelson and Rossendale.

Mail for the BB postcode area is processed at Preston Mail Centre, along with mail for the PR, FY and LA postcode areas.

== Coverage ==
The approximate coverage of the postcode districts:

Postcode district	Post town	Coverage	Local authority area(s)
BB0	BLACKBURN	Granby Marketing, Blackburn	non-geographic
BB1	BLACKBURN	Blackburn (east), Bank Hey, Belthorn (part), Blackamoor, Clayton-le-Dale, Guide, Knuzden, Mellor, Ramsgreave, Rishton, Salesbury, Shadsworth, Sunnybower, Tottleworth, Whitebirk, Wilpshire	Blackburn with Darwen, Hyndburn, Ribble Valley
BB2	BLACKBURN	Blackburn (west), Beardwood, Balderstone, Belthorn (part), Cherry Tree, Feniscowles, Griffin, Holly Tree, Livesey, Mellor, Mellor Brook, Mill Hill, Osbaldeston, Pleasington, Witton	Blackburn with Darwen, Chorley, Ribble Valley, South Ribble
BB3	DARWEN	Darwen, Bank Fold, Eccleshill, Hoddlesden, Livesey, Lower Darwen, Pickup Bank, Tockholes	Blackburn with Darwen
BB4	ROSSENDALE	Acre, Balladen, Bent Gate, Cloughfold, Cowpe, Crawshawbooth, Haslingden, Helmshore, Lumb (near Rawtenstall), Newchurch, Rawtenstall, Waterfoot	Rossendale
BB5	ACCRINGTON	Accrington, Altham, Baxenden, Church, Clayton-le-Moors, Huncoat, Oswaldtwistle, Rising Bridge	Hyndburn, Rossendale
BB6	BLACKBURN	Dinckley, Great Harwood, Langho	Hyndburn, Ribble Valley
BB7	CLITHEROE	Clitheroe, Barrow, Bashall Eaves, Billington, Bolton-by-Bowland, Chatburn, Downham, Dunsop Bridge, Gisburn, Great Mitton, Grindleton, Hurst Green, Little Mitton, Middop, Newsholme, Newton-in-Bowland, Paythorne, Pendleton, Rimington, Sabden, Sawley, Slaidburn, Twiston, Waddington, Whalley, Whitewell, Wiswell, Worston	Ribble Valley
BB8	COLNE	Colne, Foulridge, Laneshaw Bridge, Trawden, Winewall, Wycoller	Pendle
BB9	NELSON	Nelson, Barrowford, Blacko, Brierfield, Higherford, Roughlee	Pendle
BB10	BURNLEY	Burnley (east), Cliviger, Haggate, Harle Syke, Reedley, Worsthorne	Burnley, Pendle
BB11	BURNLEY	Burnley (south and town centre), Dunnockshaw and Clowbridge, Hapton	Burnley
BB12	BURNLEY	Burnley (west), Barley, Fence, Hapton, Higham, Padiham, Read, Simonstone, Wheatley Lane	Burnley, Pendle, Ribble Valley
BB18	BARNOLDSWICK	Barnoldswick, Brogden, Earby, Kelbrook, Salterforth, Sough	Pendle
BB94	BARNOLDSWICK	Holiday Cottages Group, Earby	non-geographic

The BB18 district was formed out of the BB8 district in 1997.

== Map ==
BB postcode area map, showing postcode districts in red and post towns in grey text, with links to nearby BD, BL, HX, LA, OL and PR postcode areas.

== See also ==
- List of postcode areas in the United Kingdom
- Centre points of the United Kingdom
- Postcode Address File
