= Bank Hey =

Coordinates: 53.767°N 2.464°W

- Shown within Blackburn Shown within Blackburn with Darwen Location within Lancashire
- OS grid reference: SD694302
- Unitary authority: Blackburn with Darwen
- Ceremonial county: Lancashire
- Region: North West
- Country: England
- Sovereign state: United Kingdom
- Post town: BLACKBURN
- Postcode district: BB1
- Dialling code: 01254
- Police: Lancashire
- Fire: Lancashire
- Ambulance: North West
- UK Parliament: Blackburn

Bank Hey (also Sunnybower or Sunny Bower) is a suburb of Blackburn, Lancashire, England. It is located to the east of the town, north of Whitebirk and near the boundary with Hyndburn. It forms part of Little Harwood.

It should not be confused with an area to the south of Blackburn, also named Bank Hey, for which a development plan was drawn up in March 2020.
