= Listed buildings in Hoddlesden =

Hoddlesden is a village in Blackburn with Darwen, Lancashire, England. It contains five buildings that are recorded in the National Heritage List for England as designated listed buildings, all of which are listed at Grade II. This grade is the lowest of the three gradings given to listed buildings and is applied to "buildings of national importance and special interest". Three of the listed buildings are dwellings and a war memorial in the village, and the other is a farmhouse in the surrounding countryside.

== Buildings ==
| Name and location | Photograph | Date | Notes |
|---|---|---|---|
| 6 and 8 Queen's Square; 53.69615°N 2.43157°W | — | 17th century | Originally a house, later divided into two cottages that are in stone with tiled roofs and two storeys. Each cottage is in a single bay with inserted doorways. No. 6 has a mullioned ground floor window, and both cottages have a square window in the upper floor. |
| Holker House Farmhouse; 53.69556°N 2.42515°W | — | 1661 | A sandstone farmhouse, partly rendered, with a slate roof. It has two storeys, and on the front is a two-storey gabled porch with a ball finial. Above the doorway is a datestone with initials, the date, and a rampant beast, and over this is a blocked oval opening. Flanking the porch on the ground floor are mullioned windows, and in the upper floor are stepped three-light windows with round heads. |
| 2 and 4 Queen's Square; 53.69613°N 2.43174°W | — | Late 18th century (probable) | A pair of stone weavers' cottages with a tiled roof. They have two storeys and basements, and each cottage is in a single bay. A flight of six steps leads up to the doorway, and there is a three-light stepped window in each floor; No. 2 has square basement window, and No 4 has a triple window. |
| 1–9 Browning Street, 20 and 22 Queen Street, Hillside House; 53.69638°N 2.43109°W | | 1844 | A terrace of ten cottages with end wings forming 20 and 22 Queen Street and Hillside House. The cottages are in sandstone with slate roofs and two storeys. The cottages in the terrace have a door and window in the ground floor and two windows above; in the wings there is one window in each floor. There are pediments in the centre of the terrace and on the wings, all with inscriptions. |
| War memorial 53.69601°N 2.43152°W | | 1921 | The war memorial is in sandstone, and consists of a small cross with a tapering shaft on a square two-stage plinth that stands on a base of five steps. The memorial is carved with features including a biplane, a cannon, a rifle and a sword. On the front of the shaft is an inscription, and there are further inscriptions on each face of the plinth together with the names of those lost in the First World War and in subsequent conflicts. |
