= Wycoller Hall =

Ruins in Trawden Forest, Lancashire, England

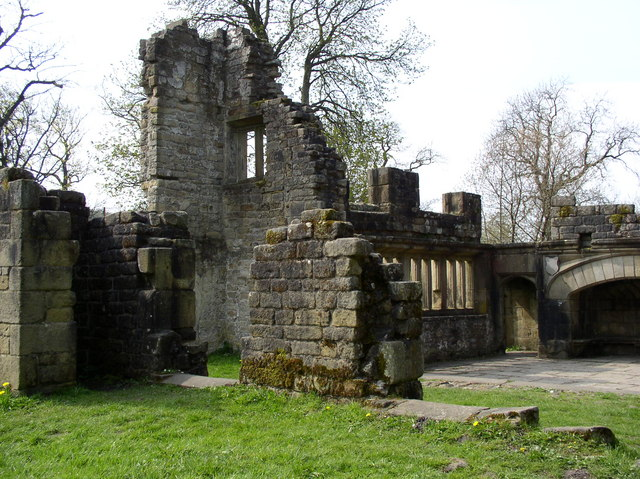
- The remains of the great hall.

- Location within the Borough of Pendle

General information
- Location: Wycoller, Lancashire, England
- Coordinates: 53.8491°N 2.1038°W
- Construction started: Mid-16th century (probable)
- Completed: 1596

Listed Building – Grade II*
- Official name: Remains of Wycoller Hall, including boundary wall to river
- Designated: 23 April 1952
- Reference no.: 1073331

Scheduled monument
- Official name: Wycoller Hall
- Reference no.: 1003130

Wycoller Hall was a late 16th-century manor house in the village of Wycoller, Lancashire, England. The hall was the centre of a sizeable estate but subsequently fell into disrepair. The ruins are now Grade II* listed, and form part of Wycoller Country Park.

== History ==
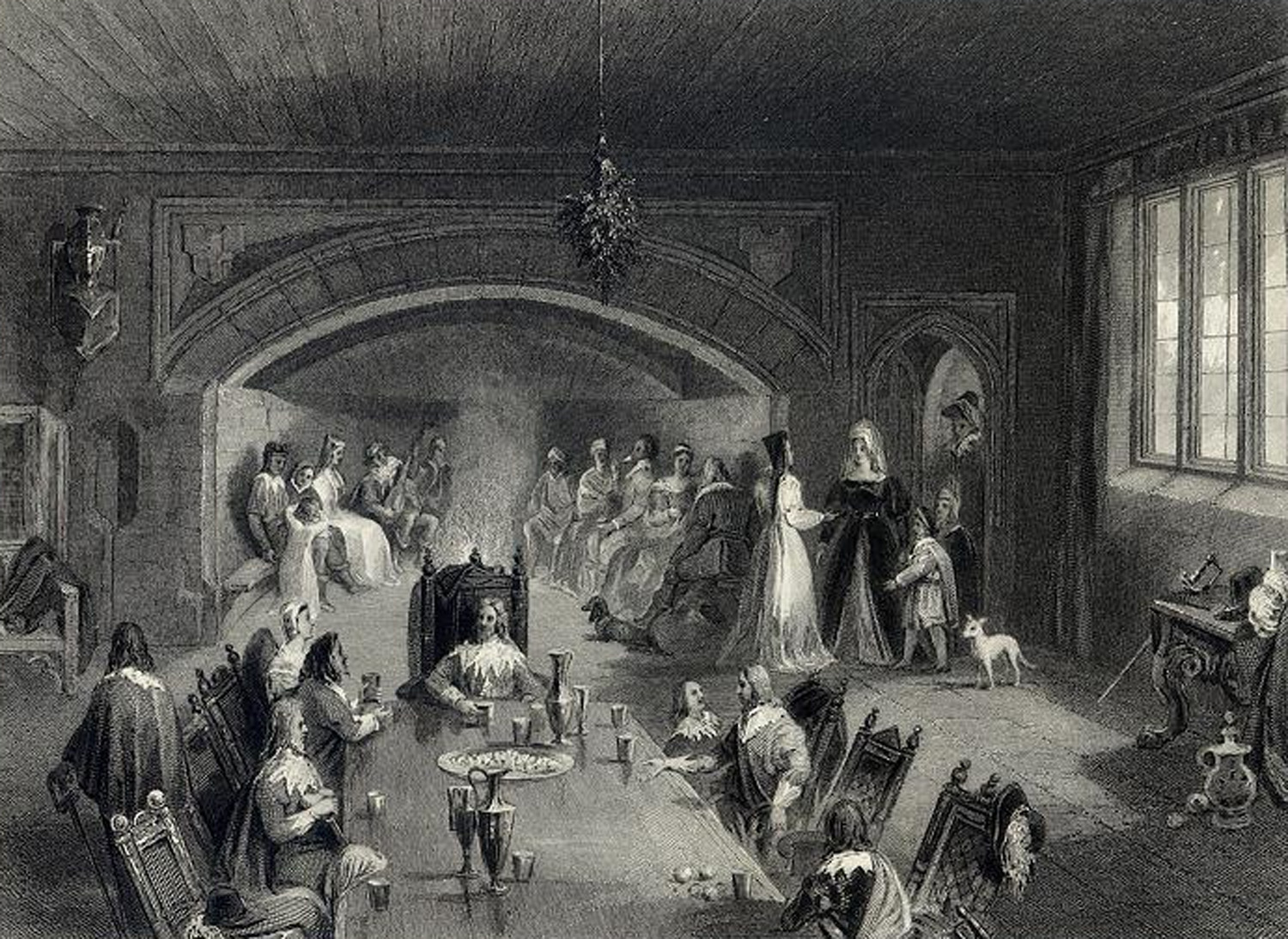
The dining hall in 1650. In the engraving the arrangements of the room have been reversed.

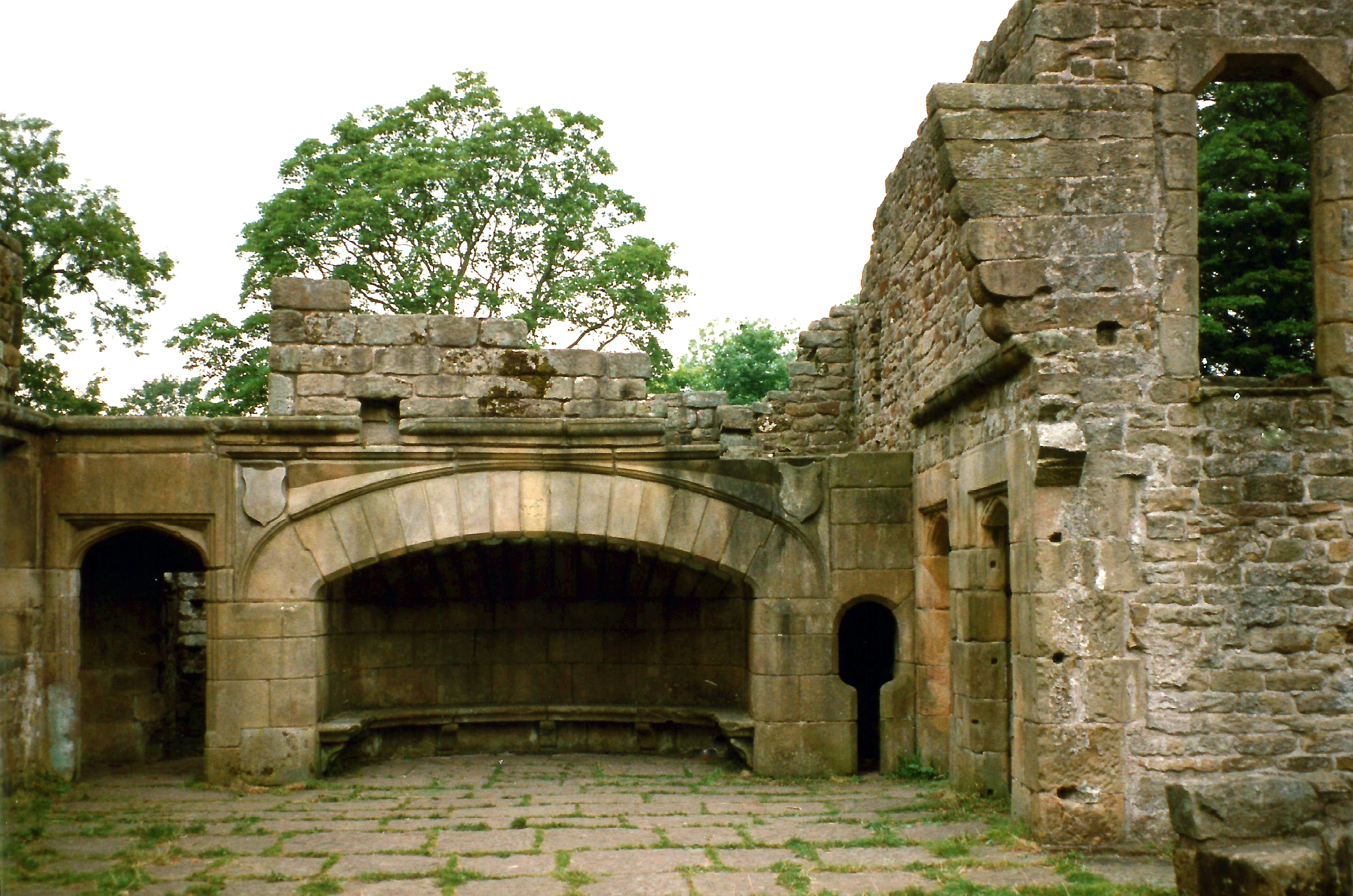
The dining hall today. Above the arch the shields can still be seen as they were in the above engraving.

Wycoller Hall dates back to the end of the 16th century, and was built upon the site of a house occupied in 1507 by Piers Hartley. By the 1590s a substantial house had been built, probably sometime in the mid-16th century, replacing Piers' original dwelling. The estate then came into the possession of the Cunliffe family, after the marriage of Pier's daughter Elizabeth to Nicholas Cunliffe in 1611. They had a number of children, one of whom, John, married Grace Hartley in 1628. The Cunliffes settled at Wycoller in the 1720s, after losing their ancestral home to debts. The estate then passed through several brothers, all of whom died without issue, before passing to the grandson of one of the sisters, Henry Owen, on the condition that Owen took the name Cunliffe. He took the name Henry Owen Cunliffe, and became the new squire. He embarked on a large building project for the hall, to create a home that he felt would be worthy of his position, and that would attract a new wife.

The building project took over a year to complete, during which time Henry moved out and lodged at the nearby public house. The work included the fitting of a new porch, a large range of mullioned windows, and the modernisation of the interiors. By the time it was complete Henry had married and the couple moved into the hall to enjoy their new lifestyle. Henry was however a keen sportsman and gambler, and ran up heavy debts. On his death in 1818 the property passed to his nephew, Charles Cunliffe Owen, but Charles could not afford to pay off the debts, and the estate was parcelled off to the creditors. The hall passed to a distant relative, John Oldham, and then to the Rev. John Roberts Oldham. The latter arranged for large parts of the stonework to be sold off to build a cotton mill at Trawden.

Despite this, much of the hall survived into the late 19th century, though it was unoccupied and steadily crumbling, with considerable amounts of the stonework being removed for local buildings. The entire village subsequently passed into the ownership of the local Water Board, but continued to decline. A local conservation group, 'The Friends of Wycoller' was founded in 1948, and began a campaign to conserve the historic village. Their work on the hall included the restoration of the fireplace in the 1950s. The entire area was sold in 1973 to Lancashire County Council, which declared the entire village a conservation area, and designated the surrounding 350 acres (1.4 km^{2}) as a Country Park. The ruins of the hall were designated as a scheduled monument and are Grade II* listed. An exhibition about the history of the hall, the village, and the surrounding area was established in the aisled barn close to the ruins.

== Design ==
The house had a grand two-storey porch, which had been removed in the 1870s and re-erected in Trawden. The porch led into the great hall, dominated by a large stone fireplace. On the right is a key hole shaped opening, the function of which is still unknown. The part of the house rebuilt in the time of Henry Owen Cunliffe was three storeys tall, and contained the drawing and sitting rooms, and the bedrooms. Behind the main hall were the kitchens. Beyond the main building of Wycoller Hall was a courtyard with coach-house and stables. Gardens were laid out in Henry Owen Cunliffe's period of occupancy, as was a cock pit. During the last years of occupancy the house was divided in two and lived in by two different families.

== Wycoller in Literature ==
The seasonal celebrations shown in the above engraving (from a painting by Henry Melville) are the subject of Letitia Elizabeth Landon's poetical illustration Christmas in the Olden Time, 1650 in Fisher's Drawing Room Scrap Book, 1836.

== Wycoller and the Brontës ==
Wycoller Hall is thought to be the inspiration for Ferndean Manor in Charlotte Brontë's Jane Eyre. The Brontës lived in the nearby village of Haworth, and the family probably visited Wycoller on their walks. Parallels have also been drawn with the owner of Ferndean, Mr Rochester's father, and Henry Owen Cunliffe. One of the occupants of the hall, Elizabeth Cunliffe, also became Elizabeth Eyre through marriage. Wycoller Hall was even used to illustrate the 1898 edition of Jane Eyre.

== Ghosts at Wycoller ==
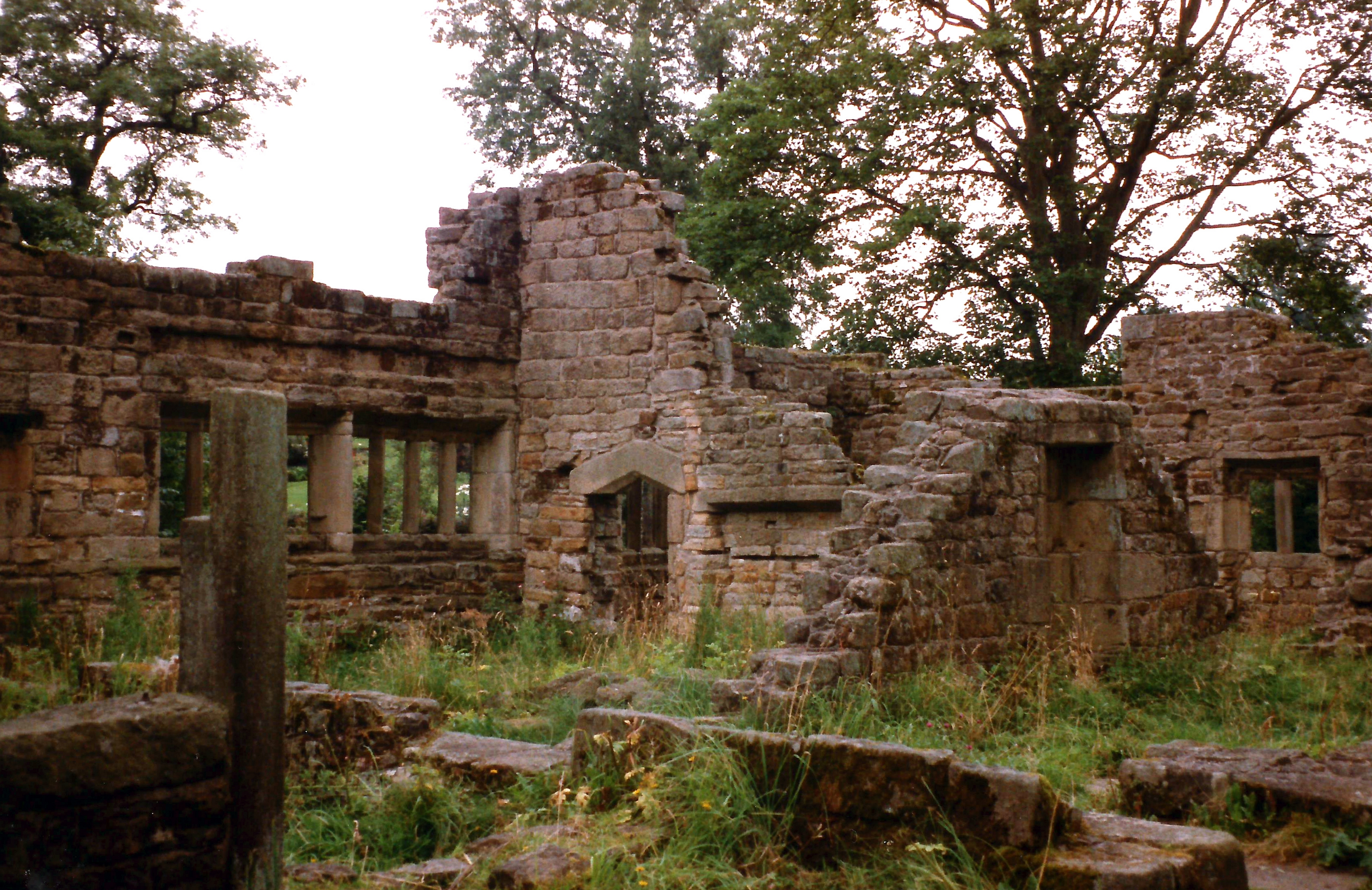
Ruins of the Hall

=== The phantom horseman ===
Wycoller and Wycoller Hall also became the site of several ghost stories. One such concerns the murder of the wife of one of the squires of the hall, one Simon Cunliffe. During the reign of King Charles II, the squire and his hunt were pursuing a fox. The fox ran into the hall and up into the woman's chamber. The hounds pursued it and attacked it, with Simon Cunliffe riding his horse into the hall and up the stairs. Finding his wife terrified at the scene, he cursed her cowardice and raised his hunting crop as if to strike her. She then died of fright.

The squire is supposedly still seen at night returning to the hall, dressed in the costume of the early Stuart era. The noise of his horse clattering across the bridge and up to the hall door, and then up the stairs can be heard, followed by a woman's screams. The ghost then returns the way he came. He supposedly is seen once a year, during stormy weather when darkness has fallen. Paranormal Investigators Colin Veacock and Peter Crawley recorded a sound similar to a riding crop on 26 July 1996.

The murdered woman herself is recorded to have appeared once to two lovers at the hall. The ghost wore a black silk dress and foretold the downfall of the Cunliffes and the ruin of the hall. She was later seen by two workmen, but has not been seen since the death of the last Cunliffe of Wycoller. Despite the compelling nature of the stories, there never was a Simon Cunliffe as squire of Wycoller.

=== Black Bess ===
Another of the Cunliffes was said to have travelled to the West Indies, where he married a West Indian woman. On the return voyage he began to have second thoughts of the suitability of his marriage, so he threw his wife overboard, where she drowned. The ghost of the woman followed him back to Wycoller, in search of her murderer.

== See also ==
- Grade II* listed buildings in Lancashire
- Listed buildings in Trawden Forest
- Scheduled monuments in Lancashire
