= Hoddlesden =

Village in Lancashire, England

Coordinates: 53.696°N 2.431°W

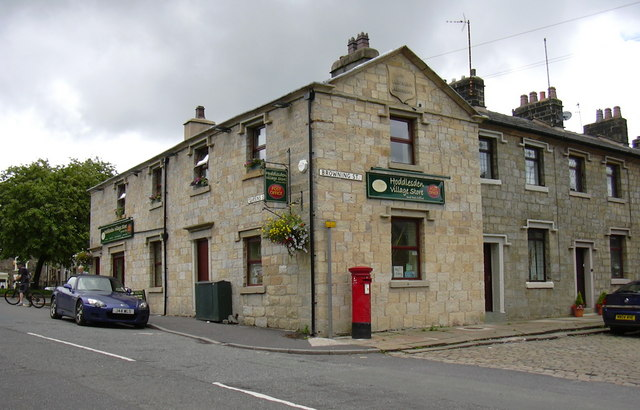
- Hoddlesden Village Store

- Shown within Blackburn with Darwen Location within Lancashire
- Population: 1,300
- OS grid reference: SD715222
- Unitary authority: Blackburn with Darwen
- Ceremonial county: Lancashire
- Region: North West
- Country: England
- Sovereign state: United Kingdom
- Post town: DARWEN
- Postcode district: BB3
- Dialling code: 01254
- Police: Lancashire
- Fire: Lancashire
- Ambulance: North West
- UK Parliament: Rossendale and Darwen

Hoddlesden is a village in the borough of Blackburn with Darwen, in Lancashire, England. The village population at the 2011 census was 1,239. It is in the borough's East Rural ward, and is situated east of Darwen. To the north there are the parishes of Eccleshill and Yate and Pickup Bank, to the east there is Haslingden Grane, part of the West Pennine Moors, and to the south-west there is Blacksnape, a small hamlet.

Although the village is now a residential area, with its residents commuting to places such as the nearby towns of Blackburn and Darwen, in the 19th and early 20th century, local industries included weaving and coal mining.

Between 1901 and 1936 the village was on a tram route operated by the local authorities of the two towns. Hoddlesden was also served by a railway line, a branch of the Ribble Valley Line north of Darwen. The line, opened by the Lancashire and Yorkshire Railway in 1876, only had goods trains, as petitions by local residents for a passenger service were unsuccessful. The section that served Hoddlesden closed in 1950.

A mill was operated by Vernon Carus, a manufacturer of healthcare products, until 2003. There had been plans to convert it into apartments until, in 2008, the building was destroyed in a fire.

Hoddlesden is part of the Rossendale and Darwen constituency.

== See also ==
- Listed buildings in Hoddlesden
- Old St Paul's Church, Hoddlesden
