= Lower Darwen =

Village in Lancashire, England

Coordinates: 53.721°N 2.473°W

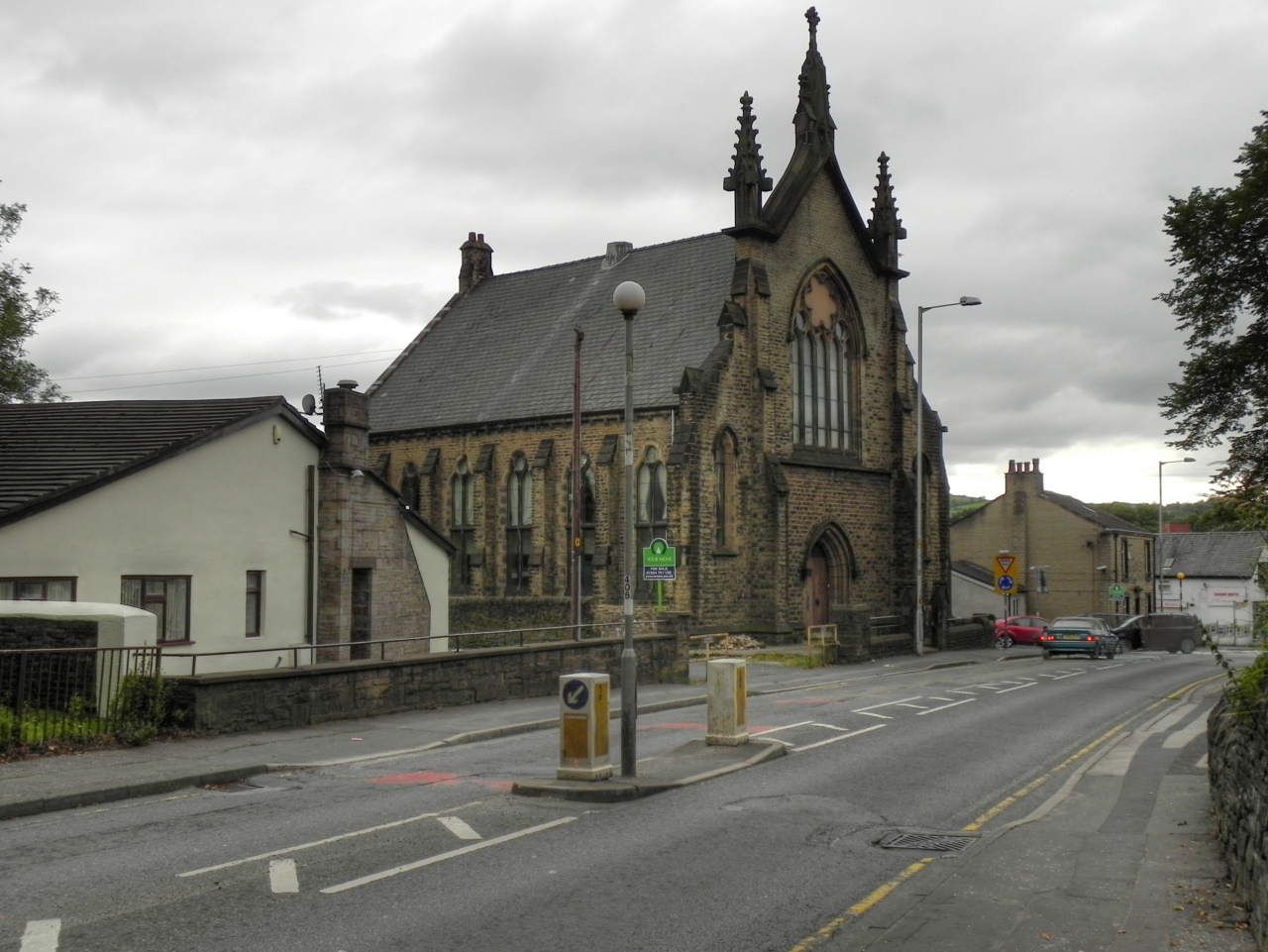
- Fore Street United Methodist Free Church

- Shown within Blackburn Shown within Blackburn with Darwen Location within Lancashire
- OS grid reference: SD688250
- Unitary authority: Blackburn with Darwen
- Ceremonial county: Lancashire
- Region: North West
- Country: England
- Sovereign state: United Kingdom
- Post town: DARWEN
- Postcode district: BB3
- Dialling code: 01254
- Police: Lancashire
- Fire: Lancashire
- Ambulance: North West
- UK Parliament: Blackburn; Rossendale and Darwen

Lower Darwen is a village in the unitary borough of Blackburn with Darwen, contiguous with the town of Darwen, in the ceremonial county of Lancashire, England. It is located between the towns of Blackburn and Darwen. Nearby places include Ewood and Blackamoor. It is situated in the valley of the River Darwen.

The former township of Lower Darwen, abolished in the 1890s, extended south to Earnsdale Brook, and included areas now in the town of Darwen.

== History ==
Until the end of the eighteenth century, Lower Darwen was a farming area. The first cotton mill in the village of Lower Darwen was built about the year 1774, by Mr. Thomas Eccles, yeoman and manufacturer. Although this did not have a major impact on the village at first, by the 1820s, the majority of the village was involved in the textile industry.

Lower Darwen was formerly a township and chapelry in the parish of Blackburn, in 1866 Lower Darwen became a separate civil parish, on 25 March 1893 the parish was abolished and merged with Blackburn. In 1891 the parish had a population of 5573. It is now in the unparished area of Blackburn.

Lower Darwen is on the Blackburn to Bolton railway line, and the line through the village was opened in 1847. Lower Darwen formerly had a railway station, however, this closed in 1958. There was also a motive power depot north of the station, which closed in the 1960s. Since the 1980s, the village has expanded rapidly, with many new houses being built, including one large estate on the site formerly occupied by ROF Blackburn.

It is not far from junction four of the M65 Motorway.

A new road was built when the M65 was extended and the junction four created. Originally named Eccleshill Road, the road was renamed to Paul Rink Way in September 2008. Blackburn with Darwen Borough Council has stated it chose this road for the renaming because it would not affect anyone, as there are no houses or business directly on the road.

On this road is a new housing estate, along with a Premier Inn and Brewers Fayre.

== Notable people ==
- Ronald Haworth
