= Bent Gate =

Coordinates: 53.692°N 2.321°W

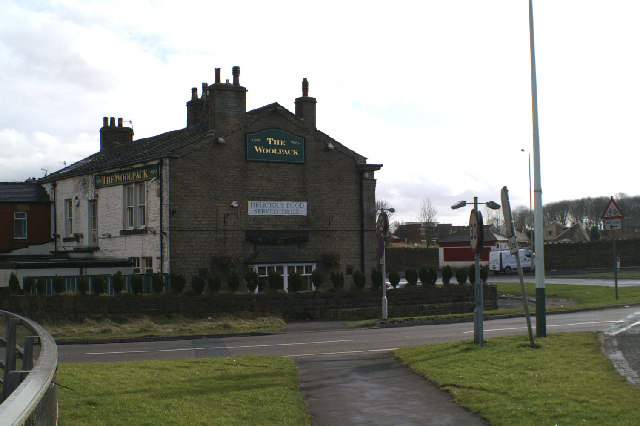
- The Woolpack

- Location within Rossendale Location within Lancashire
- OS grid reference: SD788218
- District: Rossendale
- Shire county: Lancashire
- Region: North West
- Country: England
- Sovereign state: United Kingdom
- Post town: ROSSENDALE
- Postcode district: BB4
- Dialling code: 01706
- Police: Lancashire
- Fire: Lancashire
- Ambulance: North West
- UK Parliament: Hyndburn

Bent Gate is a suburb of Haslingden, Lancashire, England, approximately one mile south of Haslingden town centre. Haslingden Cricket Club's ground, called Bentgate, has been here since 1853.

== Gallery ==
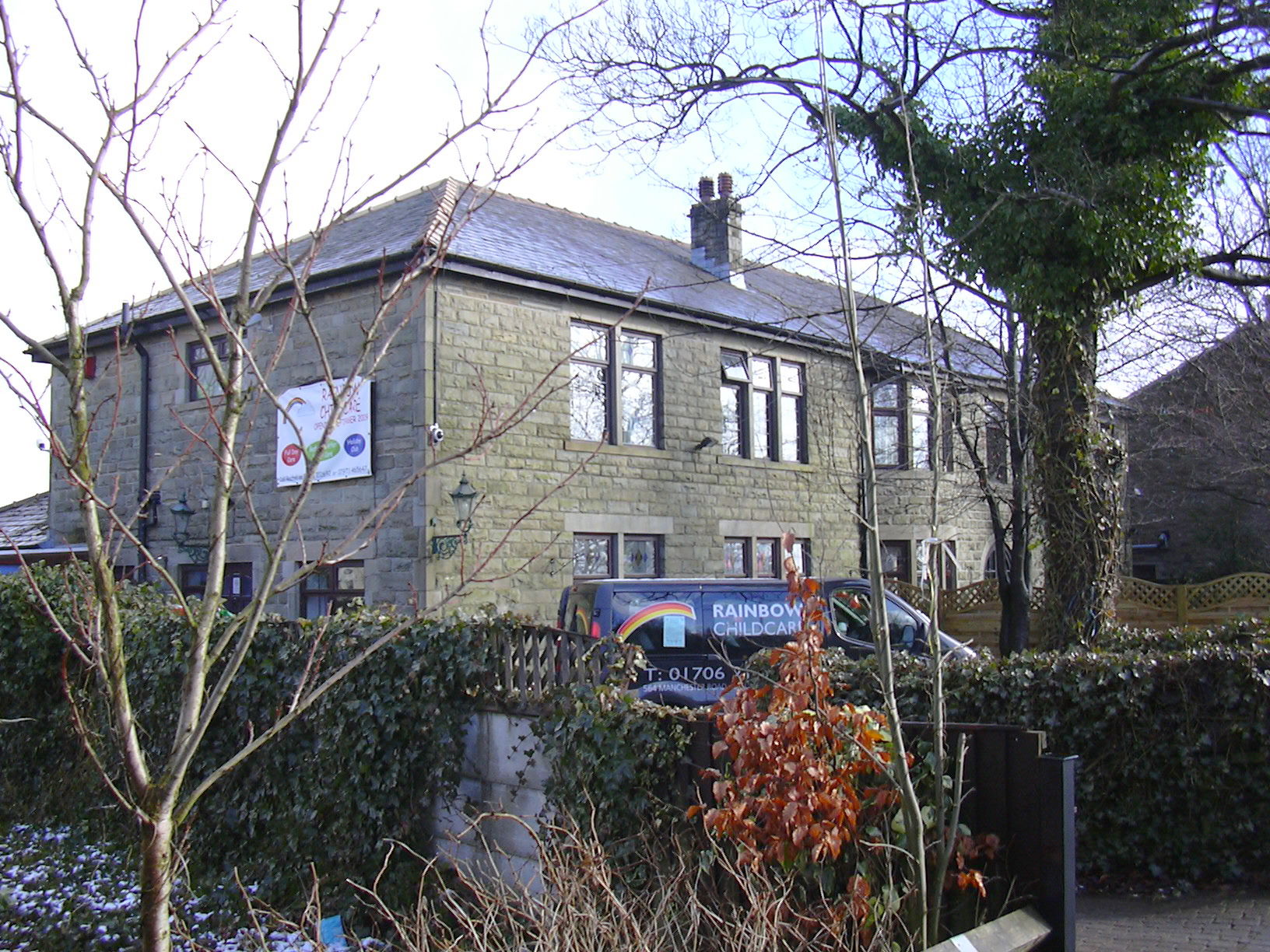
"Rainbow Childcare" Manchester Road, Bent Gate

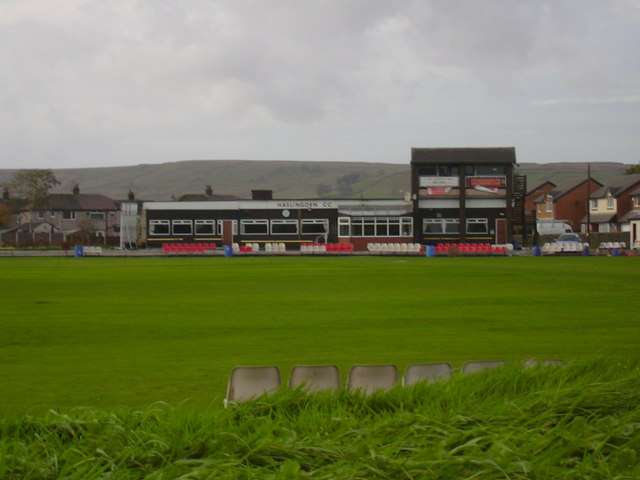
Haslingden Cricket Club
