= Belthorn =

Village in Lancashire, England

Coordinates: 53°43′05″N 2°25′52″W

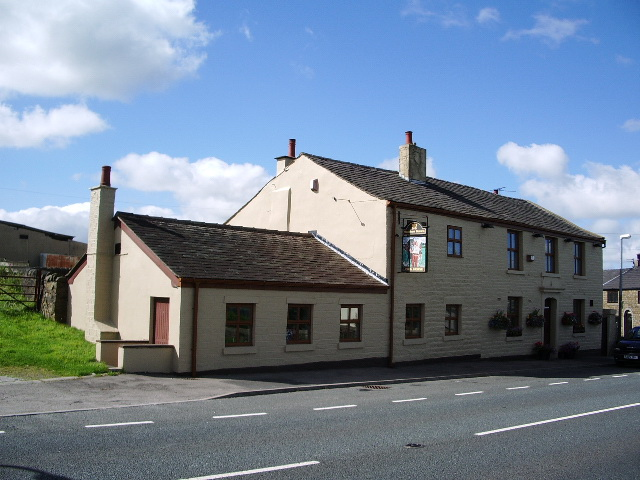
- The Pack Horse public house, Elton Road

- Location in Hyndburn Location in Blackburn with Darwen Location within Lancashire
- OS grid reference: SD717246
  - London: 181 miles (291 km) SE
- Civil parish: Yate and Pickup Bank
- District: Hyndburn
- Unitary authority: Blackburn with Darwen
- Ceremonial county: Lancashire
- Region: North West
- Country: England
- Sovereign state: United Kingdom
- Post town: BLACKBURN
- Postcode district: BB1, BB2
- Dialling code: 01254
- Police: Lancashire
- Fire: Lancashire
- Ambulance: North West
- UK Parliament: Hyndburn; Rossendale and Darwen; Blackburn

Belthorn is a small moorland village situated to the south-east of Blackburn in Lancashire, England. It is about two-thirds of a mile (1.1 km) away from junction 5 of the M65 motorway, which runs from Colne to Preston. There is a large playing field with a children's recreational area.

The village has two pubs: the community-owned, recently reopened Dog Inn and the Pack Horse (now named Marco Polo); the Pack Horse is an Italian restaurant and the Dog Inn serves pub food. The houses are mainly old weavers' cottages. Most of the village is in Hyndburn, though some of the houses, including those higher up in the village, are in Blackburn with Darwen.

== Education ==
Belthorn has a primary school, Belthorn Academy.

== Governance ==
The village is divided between the unitary authority of Blackburn with Darwen and the district of Hyndburn, both of which have borough status. The portion of the village within Blackburn with Darwen is largely within the ancient parish (now a civil parish) of Yate and Pickup Bank, with a small area in the north of the village, formerly in the parish of Lower Darwen.

The part of the village in Hyndburn was formerly part of the township of Oswaldtwistle.
