= Yate and Pickup Bank =

Civil parish in Blackburn with Darwen, Lancashire, England

Coordinates: 53.702°N 2.411°W

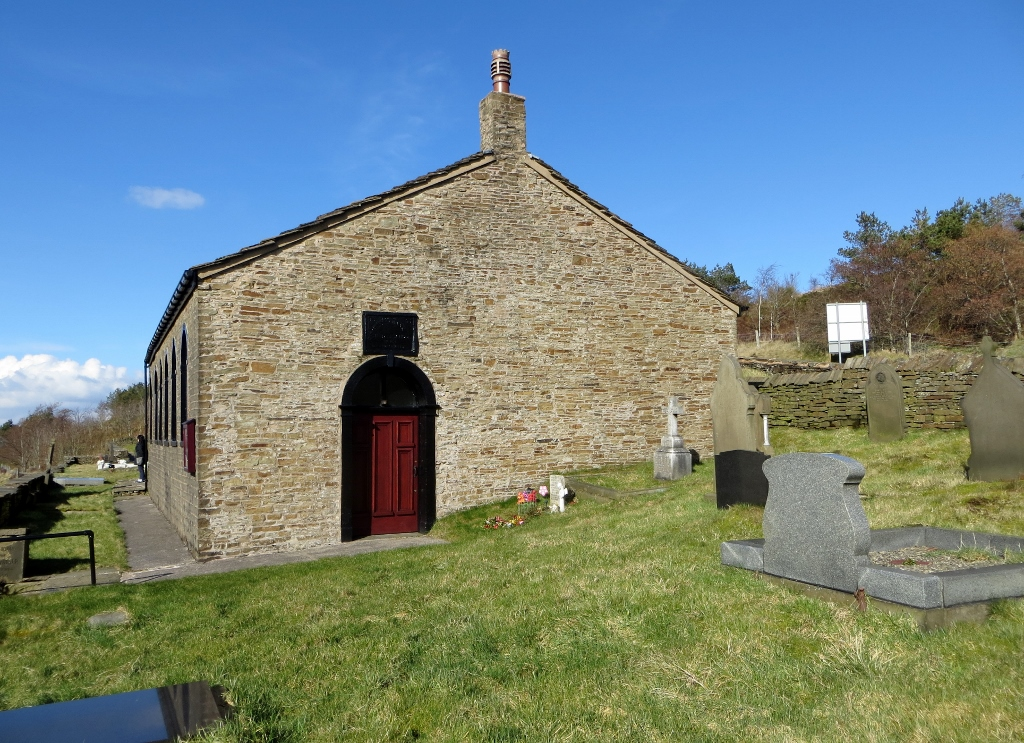
Pickup Bank Chapel, a Grade II listed building and former Sunday School. (March 2014)

Yate and Pickup Bank is a civil parish in the borough of Blackburn with Darwen, Lancashire, England. The population of the civil parish taken at the census of 2011 was 366. The parish contains two hamlets, Bank Fold and Pickup Bank and part of the village of Belthorn which is on the boundary with Hyndburn. It has boundaries with the parishes of Eccleshill to the west and North Turton to the south.

To the east is the area of Oswaldtwistle of the borough of Hyndburn and the area of Haslingden Grane of the borough of Rossendale (both of these districts are now unparished). The parish adjoins unparished parts of Blackburn with Darwen in two places: one is near Hoddlesden in the south west; the other, in the north is now along the M65 Motorway after the parish was extended in April 1997.

As a result of the boundary changes, part of the village of Guide is now within the parish.

== See also ==
- Listed buildings in Yate and Pickup Bank
