= Trawden =

Village in Lancashire, England

Coordinates: 53.842°N 2.130°W

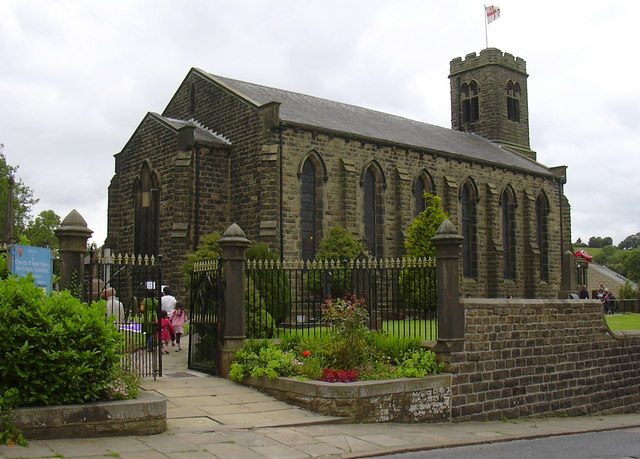
- St Mary the Virgin Church

- Location in Pendle Borough Location within Lancashire
- Population: 1,203
- OS grid reference: SD915385
- Civil parish: Trawden Forest
- District: Pendle
- Shire county: Lancashire
- Region: North West
- Country: England
- Sovereign state: United Kingdom
- Post town: COLNE
- Postcode district: BB8
- Dialling code: 01282
- Police: Lancashire
- Fire: Lancashire
- Ambulance: North West
- UK Parliament: Pendle and Clitheroe

Trawden is a village in the Trawden Forest parish of Pendle, at the foot of Boulsworth Hill, in Lancashire, England. The village co-operatively owns and runs its library, shop, community centre and pub.

In 2022, Trawden was named as the best place to live in the Northwest of England by The Sunday Times.

== Activities ==
As a way of encouraging people to visit Trawden and the surrounding area, a small group of village residents organise and mobilise other villagers in order to hold the annual Trawden Garden Festival and Scarecrow Trail. This takes place over the first weekend in July.

Trawden also holds an annual agricultural show on the 2nd Sunday in August, which many farmers, riders and people from around Lancashire enjoy and take part in.

Trawden Celtic F.C. were champions of the Pendle Charity League Second Division in the 2006–07 season.

The village football team Trawden Celtic F.C currently play their football in the West Lancashire Football League, after 3 seasons of success in the East Lancashire Football League. They played their first game in the West Lancashire League on August 01 2026, running out 5-0 victors away at Cumbria-based Galgate FC. They play their home games at Seedhill Athletics and Leisure Club, located just off the M65 in Barrowford.

Trawden Athletic Club is a running club consisting of around 400 members (as of January 2017) who compete in local and regional road, fell, trail and cross country races.

The Trawden Forest Community Centre is in the heart of the village. The Centre is run by a Committee of Trustees made up of volunteers from the local community. It is entirely self-funded, covering running costs through user fees supplemented by fundraising. Several local groups meet regularly at the centre and it is also used for many private and community events.

Trawden in Bloom is a voluntary organisation which is responsible for planting the baskets around the village, weeding and generally keeping the parish colourful and tidy. They include is a group of youngsters, called the Young Bloomers, who have their own raised beds for growing flowers and vegetables, besides planting tubs and weeding the pavements.

== Economy ==
Agriculture was formerly the main industry of the village and surrounding area, although it did have several mills, most of which have now been demolished for, or converted to, housing.

Wycoller is a lived-in hamlet in the Trawden Forest; it is also an important tourist destination and country park. It is the most visited part of the Forest and there are two visitor centres, the aisled Barn adjoining Wycoller Hall and Pepper Hill Barn, both managed by Lancashire County Council.

The village co-operatively owns and runs its library, shop, community centre and pub, in a venture described in The Daily Telegraph in 2022 as "a model for cooperative local living that offers inspiration and hope to declining settlements across the world". The village took over the library in 2017, obtaining grant funding to rebuild it with solar panels and ground-source heat pump. The village raised £450,000 in 2021 to buy the Victorian era pub. 120 volunteers do 2-hour shifts to operate the shop; it operates profitably with takings of £500,000 a year.

== See also ==
- Listed buildings in Trawden Forest
- Colne and Trawden Light Railway Company
