= Wycoller =

Coordinates: 53.849°N 2.104°W

- Hamlet
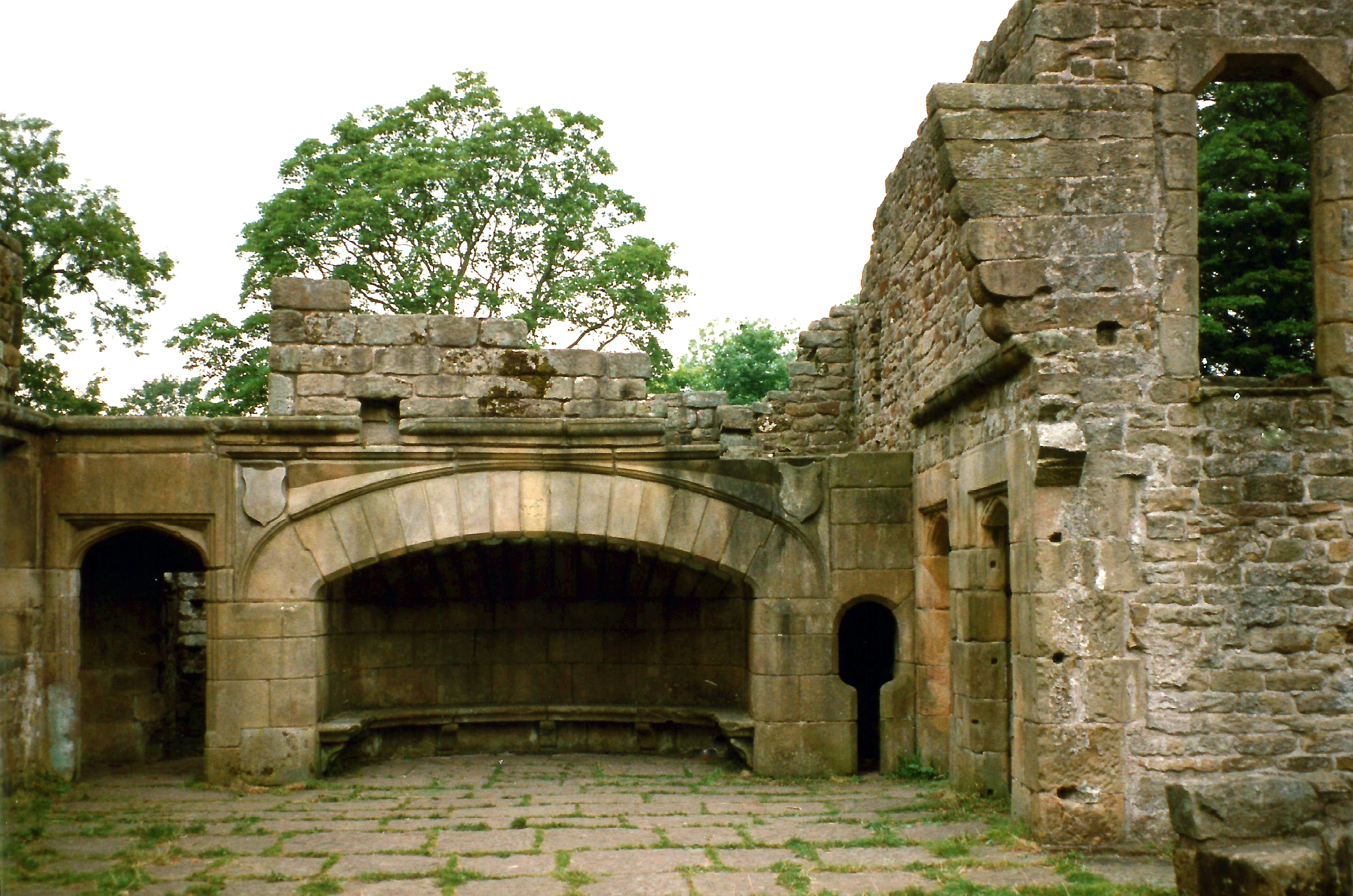
- Wycoller Hall ruins

- Location in Pendle Borough Location within Lancashire
- OS grid reference: SD935395
- Civil parish: Trawden Forest
- District: Pendle
- Shire county: Lancashire
- Region: North West
- Country: England
- Sovereign state: United Kingdom
- Post town: COLNE
- Postcode district: BB8
- Dialling code: 01282
- Police: Lancashire
- Fire: Lancashire
- Ambulance: North West
- UK Parliament: Pendle and Clitheroe

Wycoller is a hamlet in the civil parish of Trawden Forest in Pendle, Lancashire, England. It is 3 miles (4.8 km) east of Colne, near to the junction of the Lancashire, West Yorkshire and North Yorkshire borders.

The hamlet is centred on the ruins of 16th-century Wycoller Hall and may date back to the 10th century BC. It is in a conservation area, and closed to outside traffic. There is a car park on the road from Trawden and another to the North East at The Atom on Lancashire Moor Road towards Haworth in Yorkshire.

The name is probably from the Old English wīc "dairy farm" and alr "alder", so means "dairy farm by the alders".

== Bridges ==
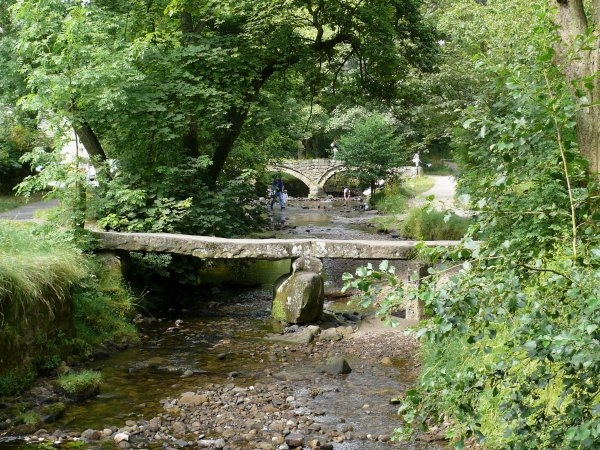
Clapper and Pack-horse bridges

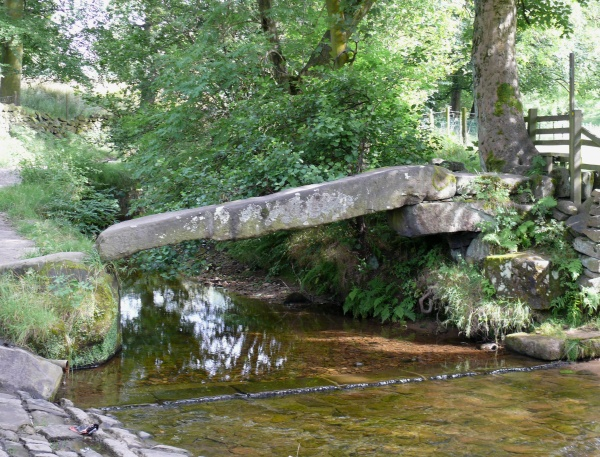
Clam bridge

Various ancient bridges cross Wycoller Beck, including 'Pack-Horse Bridge', a twin arched bridge in the centre of the village, 'Clapper Bridge' (also known as Hall Bridge) and 'Clam Bridge' (also known as Bank House Bridge). The last is believed to be of Neolithic origin (possibly 6000 years old) and is listed as an ancient monument. It consists of just a long stone laid across the river. It was damaged by floods in 1989–90, though has now been repaired. All three bridges are designated as both Grade II* listed buildings and scheduled monuments.

== Wycoller Hall ==
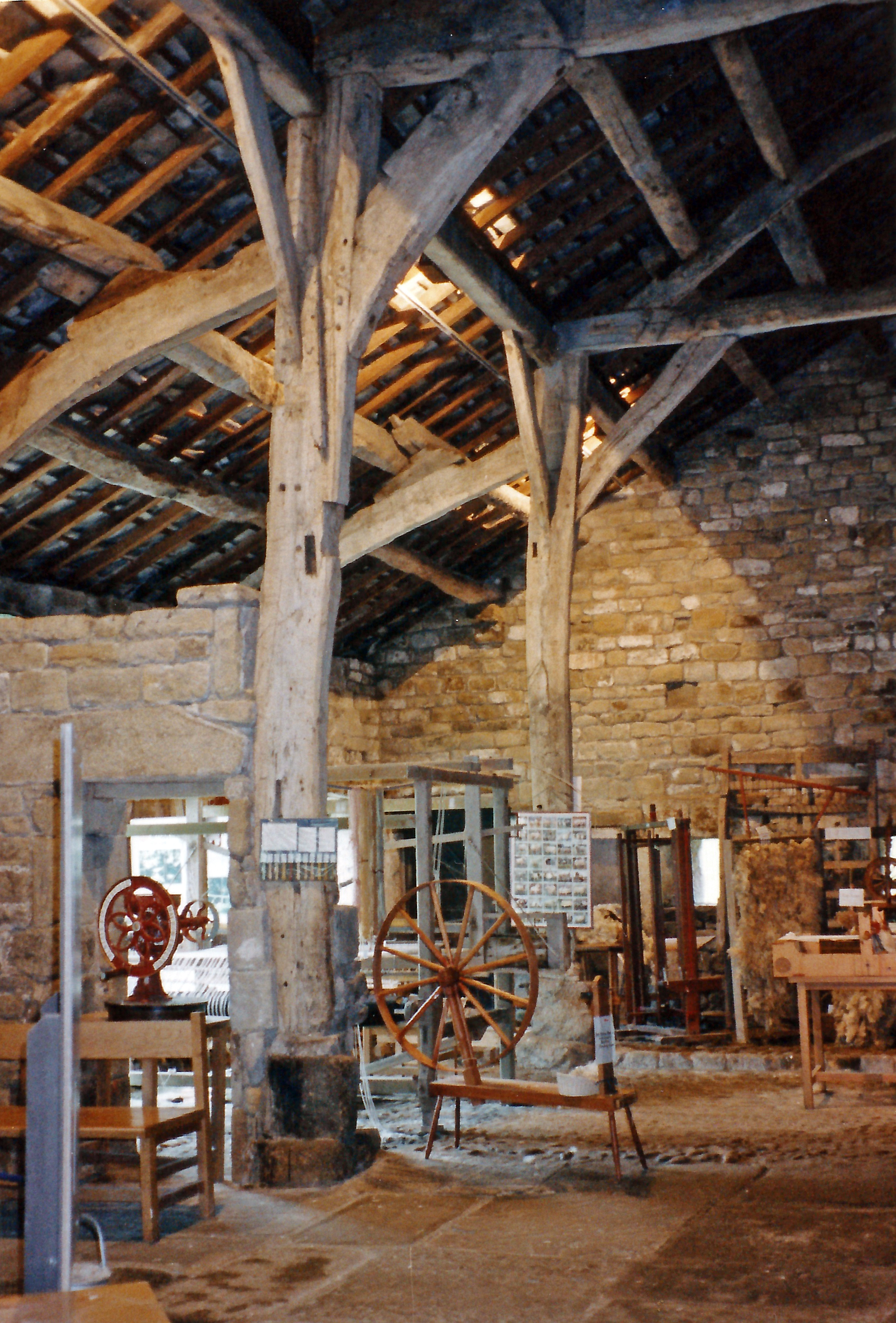
Interior of craft museum at Wycoller

Wycoller Hall was originally the home of the Hartley family, and passed through marriage to the Cunliffe family in the early 17th century. The hall was built in 1550 by Piers Hartley, and was extended in the late 18th century by its last owner, Squire Cunliffe. The structure was partially dismantled in 1818, some material was reused in the construction of a cotton mill, to help repay debts owed by Henry Owen-Cunliffe, who was the last Cunliffe to live at the hall. He was born Henry Owen of Sheffield and was left the Hall by a distant uncle (Cunliffe) if he changed his name to Cunliffe and educated himself. The hall subsequently fell into ruin and is reputed to be haunted by a variety of spectres. Like the bridges, it is both a Grade II* listed building and a scheduled monument.

'Ferndean Manor' in Charlotte Brontë's novel Jane Eyre is thought to be based on Wycoller Hall. The Brontë Way passes through here, leading to the Brontë sisters' home in nearby Haworth.

== 20th–21st centuries ==
Wycoller appears in The Railway Children, the 1970 British film based on the novel of the same name by E. Nesbit.

It also featured in episode 2 of the television series Penelope Keith's Hidden Villages in 2014. She also owned a house there, but never lived in it.

Notable people from the village include Tom Emmott, who founded the Lancastrian Party while living in Wycoller Cottage.

'The Atom' sculpture, part of the Panopticons project, is a short walk from the hamlet.

== See also ==
- Listed buildings in Trawden Forest
- Scheduled monuments in Lancashire
