= Scheduled monuments in Lancashire =

Protected historic sites in Lancashire, England

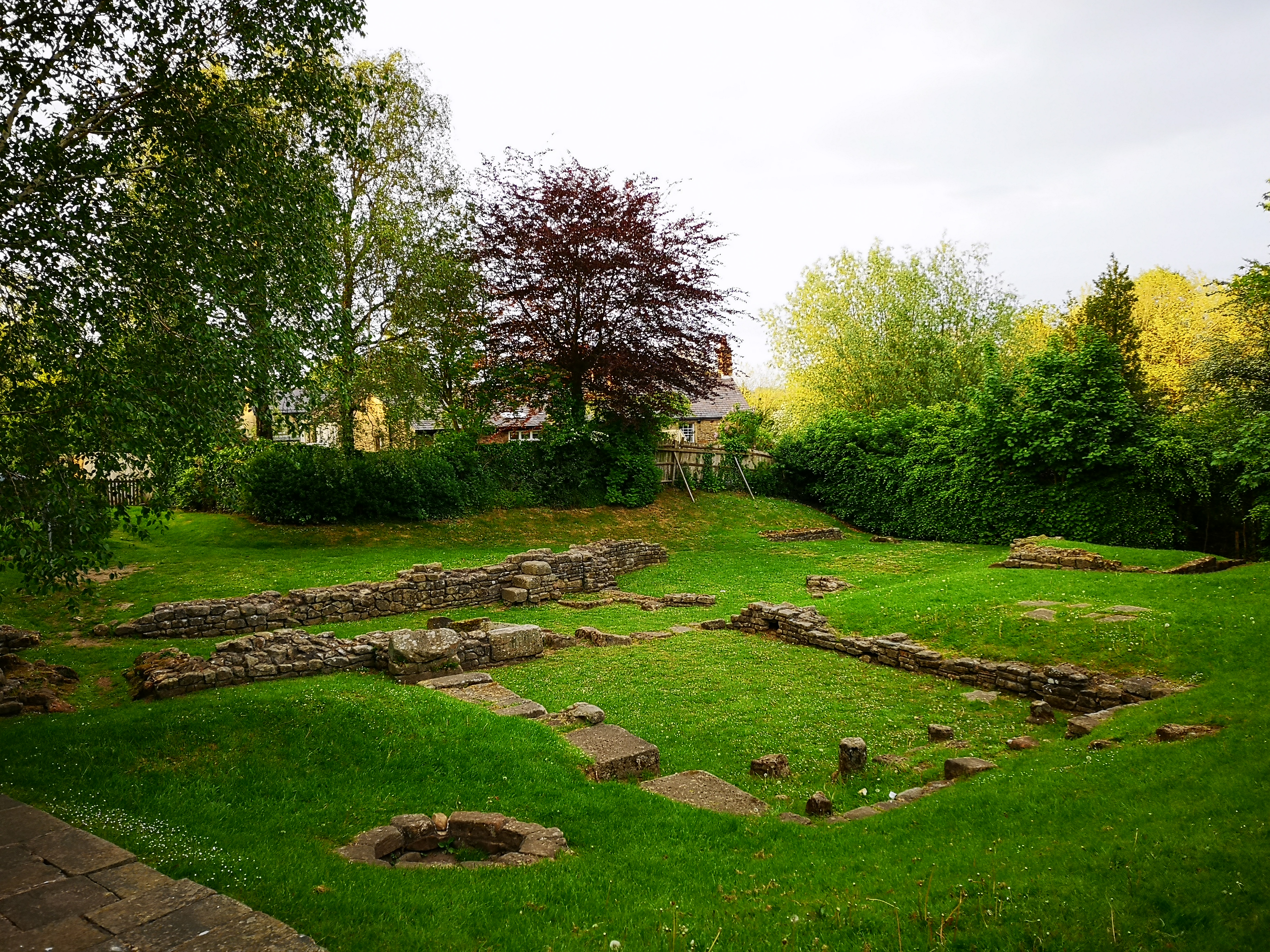
Roman baths at Ribchester

This is a list of scheduled monuments in the English county of Lancashire.

In the United Kingdom, a scheduled monument is a "nationally important" archaeological site or historic building that has been given protection against unauthorised change by being placed on a list (or "schedule") by the Secretary of State for Digital, Culture, Media and Sport; Historic England takes the leading role in identifying such sites. Scheduled monuments are defined in the Ancient Monuments and Archaeological Areas Act 1979 and the National Heritage Act 1983. There are about 20,000 scheduled monument entries on the list, which is maintained by Historic England; more than one site can be included in a single entry.

While a scheduled monument can also be recognised as a listed building, Historic England considers listed building status as a better way of protecting buildings than scheduled monument status. If a monument is considered by Historic England to "no longer merit scheduling" it can be descheduled.

Lancashire has over 140 scheduled monuments including burial mounds, Roman remains, medieval sites, mining relics, castles and various bridges.

== List ==
Image	Name	Feature	Location	District	Notes
	Ashnott lead mine and lime kiln	Mining	Newton 53.9283°N 2.4691°W	Ribble Valley	On a limestone knoll at Ashnott Farm. Lead mining occurred here in periods from at least the 1300s up to the 19th century. There are earthworks and buried remains of the surface workings, mine shafts and dams built to supply water to the site. The listing also includes a single-pot lime kiln, possibly built here to make use of waste rock from the mine.
Askew Heights	Askew Heights prehistoric enclosure	Enclosure	Quernmore 54.0552°N 2.7236°W	Lancaster	A univallate (single-walled) defended enclosure c.70 metres (230 ft) across, surrounded by an approximately 11-metre (36 ft) ditch, with entrances in the north and south. On a hilltop overlooking the Lune valley, there is also a deep hollow way ascending the hill, thought to be a track to the site.
Barrow Scout, Warton Crag	Badger Hole, Warton Crag	Cave	Warton 54.1489°N 2.7947°W	Lancaster	A cave about 20 metres (66 ft) up the west face of Warton Crag, overlooking Morecambe Bay. The cave chamber is approximately 5 by 3 metres (16.4 by 9.8 ft), with a partially blocked passage leading from the mouth which opens onto a 6-by-1.5-metre (19.7 by 4.9 ft) platform. Excavations have revealed evidence of human occupation dating back to the Paleolithic period.
	Bailey Hall and chantry of St John the Baptist	Moated site	Aighton, Bailey and Chaigley 53.8311°N 2.4900°W	Ribble Valley	The late 16th-century Bailey Hall is on the moated site of an earlier building. Next to the hall are the ruins of the early 14th-century chantry chapel dedicated to St John the Baptist. This is the only moated site in Lancashire known to have contained a parochial chapel. The listing also includes two hollows to the west, thought to have been fishponds. The hall and the remains of the chapel are Grade II listed.
Beadle Hill Romano-British farmstead	Beadle Hill Romano-British farmstead	Settlement	Briercliffe 53.8031°N 2.1689°W	Burnley	At the western end of Beadle Hill, with extensive views over the surrounding area. Inner and outer ditches are separated by an earth and stone rampart, around a farmstead enclosure about 75 metres (246 ft) square, with an entrance on the eastern side.
Carters big kiln North tunnel	Bellmanpark lime kilns and tramway	Kilns	Clitheroe 53.8861°N 2.3685°W	Ribble Valley	North-west of Bellman Farm are the remains of lime kilns and associated short tramway, next to the Chatburn to Blackburn railway line. James Carter and William Rowe opened the limeworks in c.1869. A bank of four massive lime kilns up to 15 metres (49 ft) high. Built in 1877 from limestone blocks with brick arches, each kiln is lined with firebricks. Served by a chain-driven tramway from Bellmanpark quarry, small trucks ran across a large wooden trestle bridge to the top of the kilns. The kilns unloaded directly into the wagons which passed through the base of the structure. Little work continued at the site after 1960.
Bleara Lowe cairn on Bleara Moor	Bleara Lowe round cairn	Cairn	Earby 53.9046°N 2.1131°W	Pendle	On the summit of Bleara Moor, on the border with North Yorkshire, the round cairn is thought to date from the Bronze Age. It is a 21-metre (69 ft) by 19-metre (62 ft) oval mound of peat and heather-covered stones up to 1.4 metres (4 ft 7 in) high, with a 0.4-metre (1 ft 4 in) deep, rectangular hollow, 3 metres (9.8 ft) by 1.5 metres (4 ft 11 in) on the top.
Bleasdale Circle	Bleasdale Circle	Henge	Bleasdale 53.9084°N 2.6452°W	Wyre	On a flat hilltop between the tributary streams of the River Brock. A grave and cremation urns were found in the central mound, around which 11 oak posts formed a ring approximately 11 metres (36 ft) across. The Bronze Age urnfield was enclosed by a ditch and a palisaded timber ring c.50 metres (160 ft) in diameter.
Boar's Den	Boar's Den bowl barrow	Burial mound	Wrightington 53.5949°N 2.7301°W	West Lancashire	A bowl barrow thought to date from the late Neolithic or Bronze Age periods. It is a 66.5-metre (218 ft) by 62-metre (203 ft) oval mound of earth and stones between 1.8 and 2.5 metres (5 ft 11 in and 8 ft 2 in) high. South of Boar's Den Farm.
Bomber Camp Romano-British farmstead	Bomber Camp Romano-British farmstead and associated enclosure	Settlement	Bracewell and Brogden 53.9245°N 2.2406°W	Pendle	4th-century farmstead within an enclosure c.70 metres (230 ft) square, surrounded by a ditch with inner and outer banks, which are still visible. The entrance was on the south east side and two raised areas inside are believed to be hut platforms. It is north of the Roman road from Ribchester to Ilkley (Margary 72a / RR 72a).
Two bowl barrows to the north of Hacking Boat House	Two Bowl barrows at Hacking (Note: This row contains two entries on the official schedule list.)	Burial mound	Aighton, Bailey and Chaigley 53.8312°N 2.4444°W 53.8325°N 2.4475°W	Ribble Valley	On the flood plain, north of the River Ribble, close to its confluence with the Calder, 170 metres (560 ft) north-east and 250 metres (820 ft) north of Hacking Boat House are two bowl barrows thought to date from the late Neolithic or Bronze Age periods. Both oval mounds of earth, the easterly is the more prominent, at up to 6 metres (20 ft) high and 44 by 35 metres (144 by 115 ft) across. The westerly barrow is larger at 60 by 35 metres (197 by 115 ft) wide and up to 2.5 metres (8 ft 2 in) high. An archaeological excavation in 1894 has left an approximately 9-metre (30 ft) diameter, 1.7-metre (5 ft 7 in) deep hollow at the centre of the westerly barrow.
East side of Beadle Hill	Two Bowl barrows east of Beadle Hill	Burial mound	Briercliffe 53.8030°N 2.1663°W 53.8032°N 2.1660°W	Burnley	140 metres (460 ft) and 155 metres (509 ft) east of Beadle Hill are two bowl barrows thought to date from the late Neolithic or Bronze Age periods. The turf-covered, circular mounds of earth and small stones are surrounded by an approximately 1-metre (3 ft 3 in) wide shallow ditch, which is unusual in Lancashire. The westerly is the larger, at 9.5 metres (31 ft) diameter and 0.1-metre (3.9 in) high. The easterly is 8.5 metres (28 ft) wide and a similar height.
	Twist Castle bowl barrow	Burial mound	Briercliffe 53.7996°N 2.1688°W	Burnley	90 metres (300 ft) east of the Twist Castle Romano-British farmstead is a bowl barrow thought to date from the late Neolithic or Bronze Age periods. It is a 13.7-metre (45 ft) circular mound, constructed of earth and small stones to a height of up to 0.3 metres (1 ft 0 in). In 1889, an intact ceramic food vessel was recovered from the centre of the barrow.
	Two Bowl barrows near Brown Hills Beck	Burial mound	Gisburn Forest & Easington 54.0386°N 2.3738°W 54.0376°N 2.3733°W	Ribble Valley	In the forest on either side of Brown Hills Beck, are two bowl barrows thought to date from the late Neolithic or Bronze Age periods. Both oval mounds of earth, the easterly is the larger, at 40 by 30 metres (131 by 98 ft) and up to 10 metres (33 ft) high. The smaller westerly barrow is 25 by 15 metres (82 by 49 ft) wide and up to 8 metres (26 ft) high. There are no records to suggest that either has ever been excavated.
Bowl barrow, Hameldon Pasture	Bowl barrow on Hameldon Pasture	Burial mound	Worsthorne-with-Hurstwood 53.7898°N 2.1663°W	Burnley	On Hameldon Pasture is a bowl barrow thought to date from the late Neolithic or Bronze Age periods. It is an up to 0.5-metre (1 ft 8 in) high, oval mound 21.5 by 17 metres (71 by 56 ft), constructed of earth and small stones. At the barrow's centre, there is a 0.3-metre (1 ft 0 in) deep hollow, approximately 5 by 4 metres (16 by 13 ft), containing two gritstone boulders. These, along with another boulder a short distance away, are thought to be the remains of a stone cist, which was opened in 1886 but found to be empty.
	Bradley Hall	Moated site	Eccleston 53.6491°N 2.7113°W	Chorley	Bradley Hall Farm is on a moated site of an earlier building thought to date from the medieval period. Although partially infilled, the moat survives best on the south-east and north-east sides where its width is between 10 and 15 metres (33 and 49 ft) and depth of up to 2 metres (6 ft 7 in). Around the moat there are also three fishponds that were connected to it by water channels. The farmhouse is excluded from the schedule, but it is Grade II listed.
	Bretters Farm moated site and two fishponds	Moated site	Heath Charnock 53.6336°N 2.6076°W	Chorley	North of Bretters Farm are the remains of a moated site, thought to have been the location of Heath Charnock's manor house from at least the 13th century. Today a 48-by-38-metre (157 ft × 125 ft) island is surrounded by a partly waterlogged moat about 15 metres (49 ft) wide and 3 metres (9.8 ft) deep in places. Outside western and northern arms are two fishponds, one is approximately triangular, 18 by 24 metres (59 ft × 79 ft) and the other an almost circular shape with a 14-metre (46 ft) diameter. Short channels connect both to the moat.
Packhorse bridge at Brooks Farm, Bleasdale	Brooks Farm packhorse bridge	Bridge	Bleasdale 53.9065°N 2.6620°W	Wyre	Although recorded on the schedule as a packhorse bridge over the River Brock, south of Brooks Farm, it might have been misclassified. A bridge doesn't appear on the first Ordnance Survey map, surveyed in the 1840s, suggesting a construction date in the later 19th century. It may actually be a pedestrian bridge, built to improve access to Saint Eadmer's church.
Burscough Priory Ruins	Burscough Priory	Building	Burscough 53.5828°N 2.8567°W	West Lancashire	The Augustinian priory here was dedicated to St Nicholas and established in c.1190 by Robert Fitz Henry (Lord of Lathom and Knowsley). The building was destroyed during the Dissolution of the Monasteries between 1536 and 1541.
Burwains Camp	Burwains Camp prehistoric defended settlement	Settlement	Briercliffe 53.8132°N 2.1497°W	Burnley	A circular univallate (single-walled) defended enclosure c.45 metres (148 ft) across, surrounded by a ditch and bank, with entrances in the east and west. Today the 0.3-metre (1 ft 0 in) wide ditch is only approximately 0.2 metres (7.9 in) deep and the bank no more than 0.3 metres (1 ft 0 in) high and about 2 metres (6 ft 7 in) across. The site, on Broad Bank Hill, overlooking the valley of Thursden Brook, is thought to be a prehistoric settlement; limited archaeological excavation in 1950 recovered some Neolithic finds but was insufficient to more accurately date the site.
	Camp House moated site, moated outwork and connecting channels	Moated site	Hornby-with-Farleton 54.1022°N 2.6561°W	Lancaster	South-west of Camp House is a moated site thought to date from the medieval period. A system of channels link the main moated site with the River Lune 350 metres (1,150 ft) northeast. About 90 metres (300 ft) to the north of the main site is a moated outwork consisting of a small island surrounded by a shallow moat which was connected by a ditch to the water channel.
Castercliff	Castercliff small multivallate hillfort	Fort	Nelson 53.8417°N 2.1764°W	Pendle	A small multivallate hillfort is on a hilltop overlooking the valley system of the River Calder and its tributaries, on the edge of the South Pennines. Thought to date from the Iron Age, triple rubble ramparts up to 1.5 metres (4 ft 11 in) high, separated by ditches of similar depth, surround the site on all sides except the north. The inner rampart may have been timber-laced and revetted with stone and enclosed an oval area measuring approximately 115 by 76 metres (377 by 249 ft). The hillfort has been damaged by coal mining with old bell pits evident both inside and around the site.
Site of Castle Haugh	Castle Haugh Ringwork	Castle	Newsholme 53.9528°N 2.2606°W	Ribble Valley	On high ground overlooking the River Ribble, are the remains of a late Anglo-Saxon or early Norman ringwork castle. A circular earth mound 5–6 metres (16–20 ft) high survives, topped by a breastwork, and largely surrounded by a 2-metre (6 ft 7 in) deep ditch. It is called Castle Haugh but also known locally as Cromwell's Basin.
Site of Penwortham Castle	Castle Hill motte	Castle	Penwortham 53.7558°N 2.7226°W	South Ribble	Next to St Mary's Church, the earth mound survives of the motte-and-bailey Penwortham Castle, overlooking an ancient ford across the River Ribble. Its diameter is approximately 36.5 metres (120 ft) at the base and 7.6 metres (25 ft) at the summit. The castle was named in the Domesday Book, but appears to have fallen into ruins during the 13th century.
Castle Hill, Halton	Castle Hill motte and bailey, Halton	Castle	Halton-with-Aughton 54.0767°N 2.7661°W	Lancaster	Located at the end of a promontory overlooking the River Lune is the site of a Norman motte-and-bailey castle. Today the truncated motte is topped by a flagpole, and during World War II an observation post was built on it (since removed). The castle was one of several similar fortifications along the Lune valley.
	Castle Hill motte, Dolphinholme	Castle	Ellel 53.9764°N 2.7326°W	Lancaster	Overlooking the River Wyre, an earth mound survives, about 1.5 metres (4 ft 11 in) high and 20 metres (66 ft) maximum diameter, partially destroyed by a neighbouring 19th-century quarry. Known as Castle Hill, this was the site of a medieval motte castle, although little is known of its history.
Castle Hill prehistoric defended enclosure	Castle Hill prehistoric defended enclosure	Enclosure	Leck 54.1959°N 2.5374°W	Lancaster	East of Leck Beck on a flat-topped spur is a defended enclosure thought to date to between the seventh and fifth centuries BC. The sub-circular enclosure is about 80 by 67 metres (262 ft × 220 ft) and contains two hut circles and is surrounded by three banks, the largest 1.2 metres (3 ft 11 in) high and up to 6 metres (20 ft) wide, along with two ditches. There are entrances on the northern and southern sides.
	Castle Mound motte and bailey, Melling	Castle	Melling-with-Wrayton 54.1347°N 2.6157°W	Lancaster	Next to St Wilfrid's Church the earth mound survives of a Norman motte-and-bailey castle. The castle was one of several similar fortifications along the Lune valley. The motte became part of the garden of the old vicarage and has been landscaped to include a flight of stone steps, a terrace and retaining wall.
Entrance to the motte and bailey castle	Castle Stede motte and bailey, Hornby	Castle	Hornby-with-Farleton 54.1220°N 2.6397°W	Lancaster	Overlooking Loyn Bridge across the River Lune, the earth mound and sections of the ditches survive of the motte-and-bailey Castle Stede. It is one of a group of similar castles established along the Lune valley in the late 11th century. It is the best preserved example of this type of castle in Lancashire. On the south side of the site, the scheduling also includes a World War II pill box, constructed on the outer edge of the bailey ditch.
Chapel Hill Motte	Chapel Hill Motte, Arkholme	Castle	Arkholme-with-Cawood 54.1220°N 2.6397°W	Lancaster	Next to St John's Church, the earth mound survives of the motte-and-bailey Arkholme Castle, overlooking an ancient ford across the River Lune. It is one of a group late 11th-century castles established along the Lune valley, with the church sited within the former bailey.
Chingle Hall	Chingle Hall moated site	Moated site	Whittingham 53.8167°N 2.6746°W	Preston	The early 17th-century Chingle Hall is on a moated site of an earlier building thought to date from the medieval period. The approximately 44-by-40-metre (144 by 131 ft) rectangular island, was surrounded by an up to 10-metre (33 ft) wide waterfilled moat. The moat survives best at to west and south and today is accessed by a brick-built bridge on the south side. The house and bridge are excluded from the scheduling, but are Grade II listed.
	Claughton hlaew in Sandhole Wood	Burial mound	Claughton 53.8761°N 2.7424°W	Wyre	A 10th-century Viking burial mound in Sandhole Wood, possibly re-using the site of a bowl barrow thought to date from the Late Neolithic or Bronze Age periods. Made of sand, it measures about 17 by 13 metres (56 by 43 ft) and up to 0.3 metres (1 ft 0 in) high and would have been surrounded by a ditch.
Clintsfield Colliery Engine House	Clintsfield Colliery	Mining	Tatham 54.1223°N 2.5692°W	Lancaster	On the south side of the River Wenning, east of Clintsfield Farm, a colliery operated during the 18th and early 19th centuries. During its lifetime a number of shafts where constructed, with horses used for winding, and two features on the ground are thought to have been gin circles. The structures of the steam engine house, which in 1839 contained a 5 horsepower (3.7 kW) beam engine used for pumping, and also the boiler house and chimney are still standing. There are also three reservoirs with dams. The engine house is also a Grade II listed building.
Clitheroe Castle Keep	Clitheroe Castle	Castle	Clitheroe 53.8700°N 2.3934°W	Ribble Valley	Early medieval enclosure castle on a limestone rock outcrop overlooking the River Ribble in Clitheroe. It was probably built in the 12th century, the property of the de Lacy family. The castle site remained in private ownership until 1920. The keep is the second smallest surviving stone-built keep in England.
Remains of Cockersand Abbey	Cockersand Abbey	Building	Thurnham 53.9766°N 2.8748°W	Lancaster	On the Irish Sea coast between the Lune Estuary and the River Cocker are the remains of a Premonstratensian abbey, founded c.1190 and dedicated to St Mary. It closed in 1539 during the Dissolution of the Monasteries and all that survives today is the restored chapter house and some ruined masonry. The chapter house is also a Grade I listed building.
Aushaw Moss	Coking ovens and associated coal workings on Aushaw Moss	Mining	North Turton 53.6724°N 2.4054°W	Blackburn with Darwen	The remains of Broad-head Colliery (closed 1893), including shaft mounds, gin circles, platforms and roadways. Also 8 stone built beehive coking ovens arranged in 3 banks.
	Cromwell's Mound Civil War fieldwork	Military	Broughton 53.7987°N 2.6955°W	Preston	The mound is an up to 1.9 metres (6 ft 3 in) high, T-shaped earthwork about 37 metres (121 ft) by 8 and 12 metres (26 and 39 ft) next to Moss Leach Brook, about 350 metres (1,150 ft) north east of the site of Broughton Tower. Possibly the remains of a dam relating to the medieval tower, it is believed to have been utilised as a temporary fortification by troops of the New Model Army during the Battle of Preston in 1648. It may even have provided Oliver Cromwell his first viewpoint of the battlefield.
	Cross Hall moated site	Moated site	Ormskirk 53.5672°N 2.8645°W	West Lancashire	Neighbouring Ormskirk School to the east is Cross Hall Farm. Here there is a moated site with an island around 50 by 30 metres (164 ft × 98 ft). The moat varies between 10 and 30 metres (33 and 98 ft) in width and up to 1.5 metres (4 ft 11 in) in depth, with a causeway on the eastern side, and today is almost entirely dry. Cross Hall was a residence of the Stanley family, and although the construction date is unknown, the building is thought to have been abandoned in the late 17th or early 18th century when a new Cross Hall (since demolished) was built.
Yarrow Bridge at Croston	Croston Town Bridge	Bridge	Croston 53.6602°N 2.7738°W	Chorley	The bridge dates from 1682 and carries a road called The Hillocks over the River Yarrow. It is in sandstone, and consists of a single segmental arch with rounded coping to the parapets, and a humped deck paved with setts. It is also a Grade II listed building.
Dog Holes Cave, Warton Crag	Dog Holes Cave	Cave	Warton 54.1505°N 2.7925°W	Lancaster	Like Badger Hole, the cave is on the west face of Warton Crag. Similarly, excavations have revealed evidence of early human occupation, with artefacts discovered from the Neolithic, Iron Age and possibly Roman periods.
	Dovecote at Great Eccleston	Building	Great Eccleston 53.8534°N 2.8744°W	Wyre	A 17th-century, slate-roofed, brick-built dovecote situated in a field to the south west of the village, 150 metres (490 ft) north-east of Gradwells. It has a 4.7-metre (15 ft) square plan, and on the roof is a cupola with an ogee roof which is not original. It is also Grade II listed.
	Downham lime kiln and associated lime yard	Kilns	Downham 53.8959°N 2.3225°W	Ribble Valley	50 metres (160 ft) north of Smithfield Farm is a disused single-pot, flare type lime kiln and a stone-walled storage yard. It is a rare example in north west England of such a complete commercial lime kiln site.
Edisford Bridge over the River Ribble	Edisford (or Eadsford) Bridge	Bridge	Clitheroe & Great Mitton 53.8685°N 2.4177°W	Ribble Valley	A grant of pontage was issued for a bridge over the River Ribble here in 1339. Today's sandstone bridge contains some Gothic ribbed arches possibly of late-medieval construction. It has nine spans of varying width, four arches crossing the river channel on the east side and a further five partly buried arches with a tight bend over meadow land on the west. The largest arch is the second from the eastern side at 17.98 metres (59.0 ft) across, it is thought to have replaced two earlier arches before 1799. The bridge was widened over its full length from c.2.4 metres (8 ft) to about 6.1 metres (20 ft), sometime before 1903. It is also Grade II listed.
	Earthworks in Spa Roughs Wood	Earthwork	Lathom 53.5698°N 2.8070°W	West Lancashire	900 metres (3,000 ft) south east of the present Lathom House, the earthworks are thought to be of a moat, perhaps the site of the old house. In 1644, during the English Civil War, the site was used as a fieldwork in the siege of Lathom House by the Parliamentarians.
Market Cross at Garstang	Garstang market cross	Cross	Garstang 53.9001°N 2.7744°W	Wyre	Although not entirely original, the medieval market cross is still in its original location at the Market Place in front of the Royal Oak Hotel. Standing 5 metres (16 ft) tall, the base is medieval, but the cross shaft was re-erected with alterations in 1897 to mark Queen Victoria's 60th year on the throne.
	Glass melting and annealing workshop	Building	Lancaster 54.0493°N 2.8036°W	Lancaster	Near Lancaster Castle, 23 Castle Hill was home to Shrigley and Hunt's stained glass manufacturing workshops. The main building, fronting Castle Hill, housed studios and workshops and was occupied by the firm from about 1890. Behind this, the cellar of another, historically larger building, previously the main workshops, contains four melting and annealing furnaces. Glassmaking ceased in the mid-20th century. The older building is scheduled, considered an outstanding and unique survival of such furnaces. The main building is Grade II listed.
Glasson Dock	Glasson Dock	Dockyard	Thurnham 53.9990°N 2.8491°W 53.9978°N 2.8477°W	Lancaster	Due to the difficulty of navigation up the River Lune to the docks in Lancaster, the port commission decided to build a dock at Glasson, which opened in 1787. Several additions have since been made: a link was constructed to the Glasson Branch of the Lancaster Canal in the 1820s, a Graving Dock was built in 1837, and the East Quay was extended to accommodate the Glasson Dock branch line after 1880. The late 18th-century lighthouse on the East Quay and former custom house on the North Quay are also Grade II listed.
Greenhalgh Castle Ruins	Greenhalgh Castle	Castle	Barnacre-with-Bonds 53.8997°N 2.7615°W	Wyre	After 1490, Thomas Stanley had the castle built on the site an earlier manor house, overlooking the River Wyre. Without a defended outer enclosure, it is an unusual variant of a tower keep with elements of a quadrangular castle. During the Civil War the castle was held by the Royalists, but the garrison surrendered under siege in 1645, after which it was partially demolished. The south west tower is best preserved, standing up to 10 metres (33 ft). The scheduling also includes an area farmed terraces south-east of the castle.
	Halsall medieval rectory	Building	Halsall 53.5874°N 2.9505°W	West Lancashire	A medieval priest's house (also known as Halsall Abbey or Halsall Priory) near St Cuthbert's Church. Thought to date to the late 14th or early 15th century, the rectory was a substantial structure arranged around at least three sides of a courtyard. Much of the building was demolished in the mid-19th century. The remains of the standing sandstone walls are also Grade II listed.
The bombing decoy was toward the summit of Hameldon Hill	Hameldon Hill World War II bombing decoy	Military	Hapton & Dunnockshaw and Clowbridge 53.7515°N 2.2909°W	Burnley	During World War II a network of five Starfish site bombing decoys were constructed in the area, designed to protect Accrington. This site on Hameldon Hill, 390 metres (1,280 ft) north of Heights Farm, was started in early spring 1941 (during The Blitz) with two control buildings and a number of rectangular areas where fires were ignited, surrounded by firebreak trenches. In the autumn simulated urban lighting was added and the site became a joint QL/SF decoy, operating until at least March 1942. Although the control buildings have been demolished, it is one of only three such combined sites in England still remaining largely in its completed form.
Hanging Stone	Hanging Stone or Watersheddles Cross	Cross	Laneshaw Bridge 53.8407°N 2.0452°W	Pendle	A standing cross near the Watersheddles Reservoir on the moorland border with West Yorkshire. The 1.82-metre (6 ft 0 in) long stone now rests at an angle against an outcrop, but is thought to have formerly stood upright. Likely of medieval origin, records from 1327 to 1377 show that `Waterschedles crosse' was used to mark the boundary between the Diocese of York and that of Lichfield.
Site of Hapton Castle	Hapton Castle	Castle	Hapton 53.7792°N 2.3226°W	Burnley	Immediately east of Castle Clough gorge, are the remains of medieval castle dating back to at least 1328, when Gilbert de la Leigh purchased Hapton manor. An oval yard about 40 metres (130 ft) by 30 metres (98 ft) is thought to have been enclosed by a wooden palisade or stone wall, with a stone tower keep inside. Additional defences included a dry ditch, which survives in the south and part of the east sides up to 14 metres (46 ft) wide and 4 metres (13 ft) deep. It ceased to be the seat of the manor when Hapton Tower was built in 1510, but was still occupied in 1667. However, by 1725 it was in ruins and little was left of the structure by 1800.
Headless Cross at Grimeford	Headless Cross, Grimeford	Cross	Anderton 53.6122°N 2.5775°W	Chorley	Close to the junction of Grimeford Lane, Roscoe Lowe Brow and Rivington Lane, is the lower 1.05 metres (3 ft 5 in) of a wayside cross shaft thought to date to at least the 12th century. It is constructed of local sandstone with carvings on all sides and set on a modern base. It is topped by a post-medieval flat sandstone slab, with the words TO PRESTON, TO WIGGAN, TO BOULTON and TO BLAGBURN carved on the sides. It is also Grade II listed.
Saxon Cross	High cross in St Peter's churchyard, Heysham	Cross	Heysham, Lancaster 54.0471°N 2.9017°W	Lancaster	Close to St Patrick's Chapel, in the churchyard of St Peter's Church is the lower part of an Anglian high cross shaft thought to date to the 9th century. It is constructed of local red sandstone with carvings on all sides and 0.85 metres (2 ft 9 in) and set on a modern base.
Halton Viking Cross	High cross in St Wilfrid's churchyard, Halton	Cross	Halton-with-Aughton 54.0758°N 2.7669°W	Lancaster	In the churchyard of St Wilfrid's Church is a decorated pre-Norman high cross thought to date to the 11th century. Constructed of local sandstone, it is approximately 3.9 metres (13 ft) high and sits on a three-stepped stone base. However the cross has been reassembled from pieces, with only the upper arm of the cross head and the lower and upper and parts of the shaft being original.
Higher Mill and Chimney	Higher Mill, Helmshore	Building	Helmshore 53.6899°N 2.3386°W 53.6896°N 2.3375°W	Rossendale	On the River Ogden in 1789, the Turner family built a three-storey woollen fulling mill, it still retains fulling stocks and a working backshot water wheel. Next to this in the 1820s they constructed a larger mill that spans the river, which was damaged by fire and rebuilt in 1859–60 as a cotton spinning mill and warehouse. There is also a square chimney on the hillside overlooking the mill and connected to it by an underground flue. Today the buildings form the Helmshore Mills Textile Museum and are also Grade II listed.
Higherford Old Bridge, Barrowford	Higherford Old Bridge	Bridge	Barrowford 53.8577°N 2.2105°W	Pendle	A stone packhorse bridge crossing Pendle Water, connecting Colne and the Forest of Pendle, consisting of a single span with voussoirs. Built around the end of 16th or early 17th century, initially without parapets, which were added in 1815. It is also a Grade II* listed building.
Bridge over the River Wenning at Hornby	Hornby Bridge	Bridge	Hornby-with-Farleton 54.1097°N 2.6359°W	Lancaster	This three-arch bridge carries Main Street over the River Wenning at Hornby. Constructed of sandstone, probably in 1769, it has segmental arches with triangular cutwaters and a band below the solid parapets. During World War II, the bridge was widened over its full length on the downstream, western side. It is also Grade II listed.
Ice house at Towneley Hall	Ice house at Towneley Hall	Building	Burnley 53.7748°N 2.2257°W	Burnley	In the grounds of Towneley Park, west of the hall, is a disused ice house, thought to have been built by the Towneley family during the 17th century. Repaired in 1976, it is constructed of brick and stone, covered with earth. More recently it was found that bats have roosted here, and it has become very overgrown.
Site of Ightenhill Manor House	Ightenhill Manor	Building	Ightenhill 53.8022°N 2.2767°W	Burnley	Ightenhill was one of the manors of the Honour of Clitheroe, covering a much larger area than the civil parish. The manor house was east of Gawthorpe Hall on the brow of the hill overlooking the River Calder, the site providing a good view of Pendle Forest. The earliest known reference occurred when John de Lacy, 2nd Earl of Lincoln signed a charter here in 1238. By 1296 a c.760-acre (310 ha) deer park had been enclosed around it and a horse stud established here. As well as the hall, the site contained a number of ancillary buildings including a chapel, barn and stable. It was a ruin by 1522 and by 1894 no part of the walls were still standing.
	Ingrave Farm moated site, moated site	Moated site	Eccleston 53.6580°N 2.7389°W	Chorley	Ingrave Farm is built on a moated site of an earlier building thought to date from the medieval period. The partly waterlogged moat about is 15 metres (49 ft) wide and 2 metres (6 ft 7 in) deep in places. About 100 metres (330 ft) to the west is a smaller site about 25 metres (82 ft) square, the moat of which has since been infilled. It was linked to the larger moat by a still waterlogged channel.
	Length of Roman road N of Bateson's Farm	Transport	Bowland Forest Low 53.9149°N 2.4920°W	Ribble Valley	Around Cow Ark, a minor road follows parts of the line of the Roman road north from Ribchester fort (Margary 7c / RR 7c), the two deviating at Browsholme Heights. The exposed section of the Roman road at this junction is protected by an entry on the schedule.
	Little Painley bowl barrow	Burial mound	Horton 53.9469°N 2.2629°W	Ribble Valley	Covered by trees on a small hill east of the River Ribble, north of its confluence with Stock Beck, is a bowl barrow thought to date from the Late Neolithic or Bronze Age periods. The approximately 0.5-metre (1 ft 8 in) high and 20-metre (66 ft) wide, circular mound of earth and stones is surrounded by an approximately 2.5-metre (8 ft 2 in) wide ditch up to 0.5 metres (1 ft 8 in) deep. Traces remain of an outer bank that flanked the ditch, about 2.5 metres (8 ft 2 in) wide and up to 0.3 metres (1 ft 0 in) high.
Loyn Bridge over the River Lune	Loyn Bridge	Bridge	Gressingham & Hornby-with-Farleton 54.1217°N 2.6415°W	Lancaster	A three-arch sandstone bridge over the River Lune, possibly dating to the late medieval period, next to Castle Stede. It is also a Grade II* listed building.
	Moated site at Bolton-by-Bowland	Moated site	Bolton-by-Bowland 53.9407°N 2.3472°W	Ribble Valley	In the hamlet of Holden, 50 metres (160 ft) north-east of Holden Green Farm, is a moated site thought to date from the medieval period. Today a grassy island, approximately 43 by 36 metres (141 by 118 ft), is surrounded by a c.8-metre (26 ft) wide dry moat. The foundations of buildings formerly on the island are indicated by an L-shaped bank on the northern half, and a raised platform at the south-east corner. It was accessed by a causeway across the mid-point of the western arm of the moat.
Upp Hall Farm	Moated site and fishponds	Moated site	Priest Hutton 54.1606°N 2.7116°W	Lancaster	East of Upp Hall Farm is a moated site thought to date from the medieval period. The oval island is surrounded by a dry moat varying between 6 and 10 metres (20 and 33 ft) wide and a depth of up to 1.5 metres (4 ft 11 in). The width of the moat expands to form a fishpond at the western corner, and a boggy area to the south is thought to have also formerly been a fishpond. The site was abandoned when the present Upp Hall was built around the start of the 19th century.
	Moated site and two fishponds	Moated site	Much Hoole 53.6935°N 2.7998°W	South Ribble	About 110 metres (360 ft) south of Manor House Farm is a moated site thought to date to the medieval period. The moat is still waterlogged on the west side and averages 12 metres (39 ft) wide and 0.7 metres (2 ft 4 in) deep with a projection on the north arm. On the east side are two dry fishponds, the northerly is about 19 by 35 metres (62 ft × 115 ft), the southerly about 17 by 37 metres (56 ft × 121 ft).
	Moated site at Bickerstaffe Hall	Moated site	Bickerstaffe 53.5293°N 2.8411°W	West Lancashire	The moated site of the original Bickerstaffe Hall is situated about 70 metres (230 ft) south-west of the present building. A trapezoidal island with maximum dimensions of around 68 by 68 metres (223 ft × 223 ft) is surrounded by a partially infilled moat between about 3 and 6 metres (9.8 and 19.7 ft) wide and up to 1.3 metres (4 ft 3 in) deep.
Clayton Hall	Moated site of Clayton Hall, adjacent fishponds and channels	Moated site	Clayton-le-Woods 53.6930°N 2.6609°W	Chorley	The, now demolished, 17th-century Clayton Hall is on a moated site thought to date from the medieval period. The waterfilled moat survives best at its north and north-east sides and access was by a causeway at the north-west corner. To the north and west are two fishponds connected to the moat and also included in the scheduling.
	Moated site of Scarisbrick Hall	Moated site	Scarisbrick 53.6083°N 2.9221°W	West Lancashire	The moated site of the original Scarisbrick Hall, 140 metres (460 ft) north-west of the modern Scarisbrick Hall. A tree-covered island measuring c.100 by 50 metres (330 by 160 ft) is flanked on two sides by a waterlogged moat, with the north-eastern arm formed by Eas Brook. This hall is recorded in an early 13th-century deed.
	Northern part of Rimington lead mines	Mining	Rimington 53.9016°N 2.2848°W	Ribble Valley	120 metres (390 ft) south-east of Hollins Farm is part of a medieval open-field system, a part of Rimington lead mines and small limestone quarry with three clamp type lime kilns. It is uncertain when lead mining began here, but it is documented in the late 16th century. Mining for lead and later barytes continued in phases through to the 1950s. There are the remains of shafts, spoil heaps, an ore-processing area, and also a possible buddle pit.
Oak Mount Mill, Wiseman Street	Oak Mount Mill engine and engine house	Building	Burnley 53.7899°N 2.2520°W	Burnley	Oak Mount Mill on Wiseman Street, next to the Leeds and Liverpool Canal, was originally built in 1830. Its stationary steam engine by W & J Yates of Blackburn was installed in a new engine house after a fire in the 1880s, continuing to power the mill until its closure in 1979. It was restored by the Weavers' Triangle Trust in 2001, who offer occasional demonstrations. The engine house is also a Grade II listed building.
Old Lower Hodder Bridge	Old Lower Hodder Bridge	Bridge	Aighton, Bailey and Chaigley & Great Mitton 53.8478°N 2.4512°W	Ribble Valley	A disused sandstone bridge over the River Hodder, built in 1562, also known as Cromwell's Bridge. It about 2 metres (6 ft 7 in) wide has three segmental arches, the middle being widest, and was replaced by another bridge a little way upstream in 1819. On 16 August 1648, Oliver Cromwell held a council of war here while his 8,000-strong army passed over the bridge on the eve of the Battle of Preston. It is also Grade II* listed.
Roman bath-house, Lancaster	Part of a Roman fort and a Benedictine priory on Castle Hill	Fort	Lancaster 54.0514°N 2.8057°W	Lancaster	Lancaster Castle was not the first building on Castle Hill. A Roman fort was founded here c. 80 AD, probably to command a crossing point on the River Lune. Re-built and expanded a number of times, around 330 AD the fort underwent a drastic remodelling in a style similar to the Saxon Shore Forts, requiring the demolition of buildings within the vicus area outside it. It is known that in the late 11th century Roger de Poitou founded a Benedictine priory here. Excavations beneath the priory church suggest it was built over a pre-Conquest building, possibly a monastery founded under St Wilfred. Several of the buildings on the site are listed.
Paythorne Bridge over the River Ribble	Paythorne Bridge	Bridge	Paythorne and Newsholme 53.9572°N 2.2591°W	Ribble Valley	This four-arch bridge over the River Ribble, contains some Gothic ribbed arches possibly of late-medieval construction. Largely of sandstone construction with some limestone elements, two older arches cross the river channel on the east side and a further two added sometime after, pass over meadow land on the west. The bridge was widened over its full length from c.2.75 metres (9 ft 0 in) to about 6.75 metres (22.1 ft), and the parapets renewed, probably in the mid-19th century. The Pennine Bridleway National Trail crosses the river at this point. It is also Grade II listed.
Penwortham Bridge over the River Ribble	Penwortham Old Bridge	Bridge	Penwortham 53.7487°N 2.7140°W	Preston	The original attempt to build a bridge directly from Preston to Penwortham was completed in 1755, only to collapse the following year. This bridge opened in 1759 and consists of five unequal segmental arches, rising toward the centre. The cutwaters rise to form refuges at the sides of the 5.49-metre (18.0 ft) wide, cobbled carriageway. The spandrels are of red sandstone. It is also Grade II listed.
Pike Lowe	Pike Low bowl barrow and site of beacon, Bonfire Hill	Burial mound	Briercliffe 53.8042°N 2.1618°W	Burnley	On the summit of Bonfire Hill is a bowl barrow thought to date from the Bronze Age. It is a 15-metre (49 ft) by 13-metre (43 ft) oval mound of earth and stones up to 0.6 metres (2 ft 0 in) high. The site was used as part of a system of warning beacons during the medieval period and the top of the mound has been flattened to create a platform for the bonfire. This is a rare example of such a combination.
Pikestones	Pike Stones chambered long cairn	Cairn	Anglezarke 53.6499°N 2.5657°W	Chorley	On a ridge on the lower part of Anglezarke Moor is a chambered long cairn thought to date from the Neolithic period. It consists of an up to 48-metre (157 ft) long mound of gritstones and glacial erratics up to 0.4 metres (1 ft 4 in) high, with a single internal chamber about 4.5 by 1 metre (14.8 by 3.3 ft) made of stone slabs.
	Pleasington alum works	Mining	Pleasington 53.7484°N 2.5555°W	Blackburn with Darwen	Remains of a quarry and alum works operated between 1609 and the end of the 18th century, south of Alum House Brook. Established by Sir Richard Hoghton of Hoghton Tower, the operation was of sufficient importance that King James I visited the mines in 1617. It is the only surviving example of an alum site from this period in north west England.
Portfield hillfort	Portfield Hillfort	Fort	Whalley 53.8151°N 2.3875°W	Ribble Valley	A small, possibly Iron Age, hillfort also known as Planes Wood Camp is on a slight promontory to the east of the River Calder. The summit is flat, possibly artificially levelled, over an irregularly shaped area measuring approximately 165 by 110 metres (541 by 361 ft). The defences have generally not survived well, but it is thought to be a univallate site, with a least one entrance on the northern side, subsequently modified to become multivallate. In 1966, workmen digging a trench here, discovered a hoard of nine Bronze Age artefacts including a gold bracelet and lock ring.
	Prehistoric defended enclosure and six adjacent hut circles at Tatham Park	Enclosure	Tatham 54.1106°N 2.5967°W	Lancaster	On a small hillock between the River Wenning and its tributary the Hindburn is a defended enclosure thought to date to between the seventh and fifth centuries BC. The roughly oval main enclosure is about 70 by 50 metres (230 ft × 160 ft) and is subdivided by an up to 1.5-metre (4 ft 11 in) high linear bank 2–3 metres (6 ft 7 in – 9 ft 10 in) wide. There are six hut circles outside the enclosure, with a 0.5-metre (1 ft 8 in) deep defensive ditch between 4 and 14 metres (13 and 46 ft) wide surrounding the base of the hillock on all sides except the south where a small stream runs.
	Prehistoric, Romano-British, medieval and early post-medieval settlements	Settlement	Burrow-with-Burrow 54.1978°N 2.5499°W	Lancaster	Across Leck Beck from Castle Hill prehistoric settlement is an extensive area of archaeological remains, the ages of which span a period of approximately 4500 years. East of Bindloss Farm, on both sides of Eller Beck, and crossing over the border with Cumbria, the area contains: nine burial cairns (late Neolithic/early Bronze Age), two prehistoric hut circle settlements, a coaxial type field system of similar age. There are also nine Romano-British settlements, seven medieval dispersed settlements, three medieval shielings, and an early-post-medieval dispersed settlement. Many of the settlements have associated field systems and the area was also within an early-15th-century deer park called High Park.
Coke ovens at Aspen Valley Colliery, Oswaldtwistle	Remains of Aspen Colliery	Mining	Oswaldtwistle 53.7523°N 2.3998°W	Hyndburn	A colliery on the Burnley Coalfield, thought to have been established after this section of the Leeds and Liverpool Canal opened in 1810, and closed in 1930. Alongside the canal are 24 brick and stone built beehive coking ovens arranged in three banks and a partially filled 21.3-by-4.3-metre (70 by 14 ft) canal basin. There are also the remains of two capped mineshafts and two stone-built engine beds. The coke ovens are said to be the best preserved 19th-century example in North West England.
Dolphinholme Worsted Mill	Remains of Dolphinholme Worsted Mill	Buildings	Nether Wyresdale 53.9737°N 2.7330°W	Wyre	In 1811 Dolphinholme Worsted Mill, on the banks of the River Wyre, was one of the first mills in England to be lit by gas. It is thought to be the oldest gas plant or gas work remains known to survive in the world. The listing covers the gas plant and also chimney, mill race and waterwheel pit.
Ribchester Roman Bath Buildings	Ribchester Roman fort (Bremetennacum)	Fort	Ribchester 53.8091°N 2.5346°W53.8112°N 2.5340°W53.8106°N 2.5330°W53.8118°N 2.5316°W53.8131°N 2.5312°W	Ribble Valley	On the north bank of the River Ribble, the Roman fort here covered an area of about 2.4 hectares (5.9 acres), but the south-east third has since been eroded by the river. Today St Wilfrid's Church stands at about the centre of it. The earliest fort was established in the early 70s AD, made of turf and timber. It was rebuilt in stone at the end of the century and a substantial vicus developed around it, covering almost the same area as the modern village. The most substantial stone-built construction so far discovered outside the fort is the Roman baths. The site is home to the only specialist Roman Museum in Lancashire.
	Ring cairn near Ell Clough	Cairn	Briercliffe 53.8035°N 2.1514°W	Burnley	25 metres (82 ft) east of Ell Clough, close to the saucer barrow, is a ring cairn also thought to date from the Bronze Age. The slightly oval circle of stones formed a ring bank approximately 17.6 by 16.8 metres (58 by 55 ft). Hollows at the centre of the ring are the site of an archaeological excavation, undertaken in 1887, during which an interment urn was removed from beneath a flagstone.
	Ring cairn on Slipper Hill	Cairn	Worsthorne-with-Hurstwood 53.7911°N 2.1767°W	Burnley	A short distance south west of Hell Clough on Slipper Hill, is a ring cairn thought to date from the Bronze Age. The slightly oval circle of stones formed a ring bank approximately 11.7 by 10.4 metres (38 by 34 ft). Only six stones survive today, the largest of which is 0.45 metres (1 ft 6 in) wide and protrudes just 0.2 metres (7.9 in) above the surface. A limited excavavation, undertaken in 1887, found human remains.
Lune valley at Over Burrow	Roman fort and civil settlement, Over Burrow	Fort	Burrow-with-Burrow 54.1780°N 2.5953°W54.1782°N 2.5892°W	Lancaster	Burrow Hall was built in the 18th century on the site of Over Burrow Roman Fort. A timber fort was established here probably in the late 1st century (during the Flavian dynasty) but little is known about it. Archaeological excavation of the clay-and-turf ramparts and defensive ditches also suggests a second period of occupation at a so far undetermined time. Probably in the late 3rd or early 4th century, a stone-built fort was constructed, apparently on a slightly different alignment. The fort had a rectangular plan with rounded corners, about 143 by 136 metres (470 by 445 ft) with an area of c.1.9 hectares (4.75 acres). A civil settlement is thought to have developed to the west, between the fort and the River Lune. The hall is a Grade I listed building.
Burscough Roman fort	Roman fort and sections of Roman roads	Fort	Burscough 53.5910°N 2.8358°W	West Lancashire	A Roman auxiliary fort with at least two construction phases and connecting roads. Finds from limited archaeological excavation indicate that the site was occupied, probably in the late 1st century. The stone-built fort had a rectangular plan with rounded corners, about 155 by 160 metres (509 by 525 ft) with an area of c.2.5–3 hectares (6.2–7.4 acres). An approximately 0.5 hectares (1.2 acres) enclosure overlaying the east rampart is thought to represent a second period of occupation.
	Roman kilns	Kilns	Quernmore 54.0277°N 2.7304°W	Lancaster	20 metres (66 ft) north-east of Fairyhill Cottage is the site of two Roman pottery kilns. One is an oval, stone-built, tile kiln, with its 1.4-metre (4 ft 7 in) high rear wall embedded into the hillside and the floor about 1.8 by 2.4 metres (5 ft 11 in × 7 ft 10 in). The second kiln has an approximately 2.0-metre (6 ft 7 in) diameter. After excavation in the early 1970s, when pottery from the period 80―170 AD was discovered, the first was left exposed while the other has been covered over.
	Roman milestone	Transport	Leck 54.1792°N 2.5681°W	Lancaster	A Roman Milestone on the line of the Roman road north from Ribchester fort (Margary 7c / RR 7c), 150 metres (490 ft) south-east of Overtown Farm. Made of stone, it has a cylindrical shaft now only approximately 0.61 metres (2 ft) high and any inscription is no longer visible.
	Roman road at Bottom o' th' Knotts Brow	Transport	North Turton 53.6352°N 2.3879°W	Blackburn with Darwen	Near Walves Reservoir, Bury Road briefly follows part of the line of the Roman road south from Ribchester fort (Margary 7b / RR 7b), the two deviating at Bottom o' th' Knotts Brow. The exposed section of the Roman road at this junction is protected by an entry on the schedule.
Winery Lane	Roman settlement and industrial area at Winery Lane	Settlement	Walton-le-Dale 53.7489°N 2.6816°W53.7473°N 2.6813°W53.7493°N 2.6806°W	South Ribble	At Walton-le-Dale, a Roman settlement and industrial area where the River Darwen joins the River Ribble. The site is on the route of the western Roman main road north from Wigan (Margary 70c / RR 70c), which continues on to Lancaster (Margary 70d / RR 70d). Its purpose is still not fully understood, but the foundations of many large buildings, apparently reconstructed several times over the centuries, have been discovered. Along with evidence of iron-working and pottery production and the site of a possible Roman villa.
Mellor Moor	Roman signal station on Mellor Moor	Building	Mellor 53.7769°N 2.5211°W	Ribble Valley	The summit of Mellor Moor was the location of a Roman signal station with the site providing extensive views, especially towards the fort at Ribchester (Bremetennacum). A building platform approximately 19 by 10 metres (62 by 33 ft), surrounded by a ditch and bank, is thought to have contained a central tower possibly originally constructed of wood and later replaced by a stone structure. Limited archaeological excavations have dated the construction to around 80 AD. A trig point at the western side is also included in the scheduling.
	Romano-British enclosed hut circle settlement	Settlement	Leck 54.1681°N 2.5551°W	Lancaster	375 metres (1,230 ft) ENE of Collingholme is the site of a settlement enclosure thought to date to the Roman period. The sub-rectangular enclosure contains five hut circles, the largest about 20 metres (66 ft) in diameter, along with a smaller enclosure, perhaps a stock pen. It has a turf-covered, rubble bank 1 to 1.5 metres (3 ft 3 in to 4 ft 11 in) high and 4 to 5 metres (13 to 16 ft) wide, along the north and south sides. The east side has been cut into the hillslope and the west end is less clearly defined.
Round cairn at Borwick	Round cairn at Borwick	Cairn	Borwick 54.1493°N 2.7306°W	Lancaster	230 metres (750 ft) east of Manor Farm is a round cairn thought to date from the Bronze Age. It is an up to 0.7-metre (2 ft 4 in) high, 19.5-by-31-metre (64 by 102 ft) oval mound of turf covered stones.
Round cairn on Bleara Moor	Round cairn at Earby	Cairn	Earby 53.9047°N 2.1167°W	Pendle	In the West Craven area historically in the West Riding of Yorkshire, 230 metres (750 ft) west of the Bleara Lowe round cairn, is another, also thought to date from the Bronze Age. It is a 23-metre (75 ft) by 21-metre (69 ft) oval mound of peat and heather-covered stones up to 1.2 metres (3 ft 11 in) high.
	Round cairn on Hameldon Pasture	Cairn	Worsthorne-with-Hurstwood 53.7896°N 2.1666°W	Burnley	On Hameldon Pasture, close to the bowl barrow, is a round cairn thought to date from the Bronze Age. It is a 13-metre (43 ft) wide, circular mound of earth and stones up to 0.3 metres (1 ft 0 in) high. Hollows at the centre of the barrow are the site of an archaeological excavation, undertaken in 1843, during which an interment urn was discovered.
Noon Hill summit	Round cairn on Noon Hill	Cairn	Rivington 53.6302°N 2.5353°W	Chorley	On the northern side of the summit of Noon Hill is a round cairn, thought to date from the Bronze Age. It is a 21-by-19-metre (69 by 62 ft) oval mound of stones and earth up to 1.3 metres (4 ft 3 in) high. Believed to have had a surrounding kerb of gritstone boulders, today only three can be seen of the south side of the cairn. There is another nearby on Winter Hill.
Parlick Pike summit	Round cairn on Parlick Pike	Cairn	Chipping & Bleasdale 53.8998°N 2.6167°W	Ribble Valley / Wyre	At the summit of Parlick Pike in the Forest of Bowland, there is a Bronze Age round cairn. It consists of a circular mound of mainly turf covered stones up to 1.4 metres (4 ft 7 in) high and 17 metres (56 ft) in diameter.
Cairn on Summerhouse Hill	Round cairn on Summerhouse Hill	Cairn	Yealand Conyers 54.1619°N 2.7650°W	Lancaster	On the eastern slope of Summerhouse Hill, toward the summit, is a round cairn, thought to date from the Bronze Age. It is a turf-covered, 12.5-by-9.4-metre (41 by 31 ft) oval mound of limestone rubble and earth up to 0.6 metres (2 ft 0 in) high, with a surrounding kerb of limestone blocks. An excavation undertaken in 1778, has left a 0.3-metre (1 ft 0 in) deep, 2.5-metre (8 ft 2 in) diameter circular depression at the centre of the cairn.
Round cairn on Thornley Hall Fell	Round cairn on Thornley Hall Fell	Cairn	Thornley-with-Wheatley 53.8592°N 2.5408°W	Ribble Valley	430 metres (1,410 ft) east of Meg Hall, at a local high point on Thornley Hall Fell, is a round cairn, thought to date from the Bronze Age. It is a 36-metre (118 ft) diameter circular mound of stones and earth up to 0.5 metres (1 ft 8 in) high. The cairn has been disturbed on the northern side and a pile of loose stones dumped on it.
Winter Hill cairn site	Round cairn on Winter Hill	Cairn	Rivington 53.6305°N 2.5220°W	Chorley	On the northern side of the summit plateau of Winter Hill is a round cairn, thought to date from the Bronze Age. It is a 19.2-metre (63 ft) circular mound of stones and earth up to 0.3 metres (1 ft 0 in) high, with a surrounding kerb about 0.4 metres (1 ft 4 in) high. Analysis of pollen retrieved during an excavation in the 1950s, suggests it was constructed between 1600 and 1400 BC. There is another nearby on Noon Hill.
Round Loaf Tumulus	Round Loaf bowl barrow on Anglezarke Moor	Burial mound	Anglezarke 53.6592°N 2.5493°W	Chorley	A bowl barrow thought to date from the late Neolithic or Bronze Age periods. It is a 73-metre (240 ft) by 66-metre (217 ft) oval mound, constructed of earth and small stones to a height of 3.6 to 5.5 metres (12 to 18 ft).
	Rufford moated site	Moated site	Rufford 53.6482°N 2.8217°W	West Lancashire	A medieval moated site at Longshaw Wood. The now tree covered 30-by-25-metre (98 ft × 82 ft) island and the surrounding moat 5–10 metres (16–33 ft) wide and 1.5 metres (4 ft 11 in) deep, with access causeways on two sides.
Ell Clough Saucer barrow	Saucer barrow near Ell Clough	Burial mound	Briercliffe 53.8033°N 2.1503°W	Burnley	90 metres (300 ft) east of Ell Clough is a saucer barrow thought to date from the Bronze Age. The approximately 0.4-metre (1 ft 4 in) high and 14-metre (46 ft) wide, circular mound of earth and stones is surrounded by an approximately 1.5-metre (4 ft 11 in) wide ditch up to 0.2 metres (7.9 in) deep. An outer bank flanks the ditch, about 2.5 metres (8 ft 2 in) wide and up to 1 metre (3 ft 3 in) high. A circular hollow at the centre of the mound is the site of an archaeological excavation, undertaken in 1887.
Sawley Abbey Ruins	Sawley Abbey	Building	Sawley 53.9117°N 2.3395°W	Ribble Valley	A Cistercian abbey operated here from 1149 until 1536, founded by William de Percy, originally as a colony of Newminster Abbey. As with Whalley, the last abbot was executed for his part in the Pilgrimage of Grace. The most visible remains today are the ruins of the church and attached buildings, which still retains walls standing up to 8 metres (26 ft) high. It is also a Grade I listed building.
	Scarisbrick Park holy well	Well	Scarisbrick 53.6012°N 2.9268°W	West Lancashire	A medieval holy well a short distance north of Scarisbrick Park wayside cross. Before to the construction of the park wall the well would have been accessible from both the road and the medieval wayside cross, for the benefit of travellers.
Scarisbrick Wayside Cross	Scarisbrick Park wayside cross	Cross	Scarisbrick 53.6010°N 2.926916°W	West Lancashire	A medieval wayside cross a short distance south of Scarisbrick Park holy well, on the edge of Scarisbrick Park. It is about 1.7 metres (5 ft 7 in) tall and 0.3 metres (1 ft 0 in) thick. and all of the cross arms have been partly damaged. It marked the route between Scarisbrick and Ormskirk.
	Sellet Bank prehistoric defended enclosure	Enclosure	Whittington 54.1902°N 2.6067°W	Lancaster	On the eastern slope of Sellet Bank near the River Lune is a defended enclosure thought to date to between the seventh and fifth centuries BC. The sub-circular enclosure is approximately 52 by 50 metres (171 ft × 164 ft). On the western side a steep slope has been formed by the enclosure having been cut into the hillside and on the south side there is a single 0.3-metre (1 ft 0 in) high bank approximately 6 metres (20 ft) wide perhaps with a ditch. The northern and eastern sides have double banks separated by about 6 metres (20 ft), the inner measuring up to 0.4 metres (1 ft 4 in) high and 6–9 metres (20–30 ft) wide, the outer measuring up to 0.8 metres (2 ft 7 in) high and 4–8 metres (13–26 ft) wide.
	Site of Newsholme Old Hall	Building	Newsholme 53.9581°N 2.2516°W	Ribble Valley	Newsholme was mentioned in the Domesday Book but little is known of the old hall's history. Next to the Ribble, north-west of Castle Haugh and next to Demesne Farm, the site now has shallow ditches around a level earth area 80 by 100 metres (260 by 330 ft), containing the hall's foundations.
Skerton Bridge over the River Lune in Lancaster	Skerton Bridge	Bridge	Lancaster 54.0545°N 2.7965°W	Lancaster	This bridge over the River Lune was designed by Thomas Harrison and was completed in 1787. It consists of five shallow semi-elliptical arches with semicircular cutwaters, and was the first major public bridge in England to have a flat deck. The east end has been altered to make a passage for a railway which opened in 1849. It is also a Grade II* listed building.
Stone circle on Delf Hill	Small stone circle on Delf Hill	Henge	Briercliffe 53.7998°N 2.1523°W	Burnley	About 80 metres (260 ft) east of the summit of Delf Hill there is a small stone circle, thought to date from the late Neolithic to the middle Bronze Age. Seven stones, some of which are still standing, have been arranged in a 7-metre (23 ft) circle. In the centre is a 0.2-metre (7.9 in) high, 2.4-metre (7 ft 10 in) diameter cairn surrounded by a shallow ditch. Limited archaeological excavation on the cairn was undertaken in 1842, during which three interment urns were discovered.
	Spigot mortar (Blacker Bombard) position	Military	Hapton 53.7853°N 2.3129°W	Burnley	At the north end of the village is a position for a 'Blacker Bombard' anti-tank 29mm spigot mortar dating to World War II. It comprises two 3-metre (9.8 ft) diameter sunken firing emplacements, each with a concrete thimble to mount the weapon and a ready-use ammunition locker, along with an Anderson shelter style store. Only a handful of these emplacements are known to exist in the North West.
St. Patrick's Chapel, Heysham	St Patrick's early Christian chapel and associated cemetery	Building	Lower Heysham, Lancaster 54.0475°N 2.9028°W	Lancaster	On the headland above St Peter's Church is the ruin of an earlier chapel, dedicated to Saint Patrick, itself built over the foundations of an even older building. The scheduling also includes the cemetery, with six rock-cut graves to the west of the chapel and a further two to the south east. Excavations at the site suggest it has been a Christian place of worship since possibly the 8th century.
Reversing triangle	Steam tramway reversing triangle	Transport	Darwen 53.6804°N 2.4589°W	Blackburn with Darwen	A reversing triangle originally constructed in 1881 as the terminus of the Blackburn and Darwen tram system, one of the first to be authorized to run solely on steam power in the UK.
Stock Beck	Stock medieval settlement	Settlement	Bracewell and Brogden 53.9358°N 2.2026°W	Pendle	In the valley of Stock Beck, north of Barnoldswick, was a settlement of unknown age, thought to have been abandoned during the 14th century. Evendence remains of enclosures or paddocks, hollow ways, house platforms, allotments or crofts, and wells. To the south, a communal, medieval open-field system spreads over Hawber Hill, which is topped by a square building platform. The site is unusual as it appears not to have a defined form and seems to represent a less structured, piecemeal development.
Summerhouse Hill	Stone circle on Summerhouse Hill	Henge	Yealand Conyers 54.1626°N 2.7679°W54.1627°N 2.7666°W54.1620°N 2.7655°W	Lancaster	On the summit of Summerhouse Hill there is a stone circle, thought to date from the late Neolithic to the middle Bronze Age. Four stones remain, arranged in a 140-metre (460 ft) circle, their sizes 1.3–1.6 metres (4 ft 3 in – 5 ft 3 in) high by 2.1–3.3 metres (6 ft 11 in – 10 ft 10 in) long by 0.9–1.8 metres (2 ft 11 in – 5 ft 11 in) wide. A further 13 small hollows have been located, thought to be the socket holes of stones which previously formed part of the circle. There are also two outlying stones situated to the east and west. The circle was largely surrounded by a ditch, except on the eastern side.
Cheetham Close	Stone circle, ring cairn and two round cairns on Cheetham Close	Henge	North Turton 53.6385°N 2.4302°W	Blackburn with Darwen	A stone circle, ring cairn and two round cairns in a cluster on a gentle slope, below the summit of Cheetham Close on the border with Greater Manchester. Presumed to be Bronze Age in origin.
Thieveley Lead Mine, Cliviger	Thieveley lead mine	Mining	Cliviger 53.7466°N 2.2015°W53.7462°N 2.1937°W	Burnley	Mining at Thieveley commenced shortly after lead was discovered here in 1627, but is only thought to have continued for about a decade, with parts of the area reworked for another short period sometime after 1753. The original smeltmill is believed to have utilised foot-powered bellows, but was soon superseded by a larger mill at the bottom of the valley. The eastern end of the site, 330 metres (1,080 ft) south-west of Buckleys, includes several shafts, an ore processing area and the buried remains of the early smelt mill. 910 metres (2,990 ft) WSW of Buckleys, close to Black Clough there is another a shaft, a leat, and the remains of a buddle.
One of three high crosses at Whalley	Three high crosses in St Mary's churchyard	Cross	Whalley 53.8478°N 2.4512°W	Ribble Valley	In the churchyard of St Mary's Church are three decorated pre-Norman cross shafts thought to date to the early 11th century. They are constructed of local sandstone with the tallest being approximately 2.9 metres (9 ft 6 in). Less than 50 high crosses survive in England and, although partly weathered and damaged, they have survived reasonably well and as a group are unparalleled in Lancashire.
Torrisholme Barrow	Torrisholme bowl barrow	Burial mound	Morecambe 54.0713°N 2.8272°W	Lancaster	On top of a small hill to the north east of Torrisholme is a bowl barrow thought to date from the late Neolithic or Bronze Age periods. It is a flat topped 32-metre (105 ft) circular mound, constructed of earth and small stones to a height of up to 2.3 metres (7 ft 7 in). A trig point on the barrow is also included in the scheduling.
Twist Castle Romano-British farmstead	Twist Castle Romano-British farmstead	Castle	Briercliffe 53.7995°N 2.1705°W	Burnley	At the western end of Twist Hill, with extensive views over the surrounding area. An earth and stone rampart surviving up to 1 metre (3 ft 3 in) high, around a rectangular farmstead enclosure about 44 by 40 metres (144 by 131 ft), with an entrance on the eastern side. There would also have been an outer ditch but little trace now remains. Attached to the south eastern side of the enclosure, next to the entrance, is a c.18-metre (59 ft) square annexe also with an earth and stone wall.
Large roadside limekiln at Twiston	Twiston lime kiln and associated tramway	Kilns	Twiston 53.8955°N 2.2920°W	Ribble Valley	On the roadside, 250 metres (820 ft) east of Twiston Mill, is a disused 19th-century lime kiln and the earthwork remains of a short tramway from the adjacent quarry. The single-pot, draw hole type kiln is about 7 metres (23 ft) high with a segmental draw arch approximately 2 metres (6 ft 7 in) high and 4 metres (13 ft) wide. To the south west c.30-metre (98 ft) long embankment carried the tramway up to the 6-metre (20 ft) diameter charge hole on top of the kiln.
Ring Stones Camp	Two Romano-British farmsteads known as Ring Stones	Settlement	Worsthorne-with-Hurstwood 53.7932°N 2.1738°W	Burnley	South of Twist Castle, across Swinden Water, Ring Stones Camp is the site of two Romano-British farmsteads, a later one built partially over the earlier. The older farmstead was about 50 metres (160 ft) square and part of the flanking ditch is still faintly visible. Some time after a replacement was constructed offset and less square, the earth and stone rampart surviving up to 0.5 metres (1 ft 8 in) high, with a 3-metre (9.8 ft) wide outer ditch of similar depth. The enclosure measuring 48 by 33 by 39 by 37 metres (157 by 108 by 128 by 121 ft), with entrances on the east and west sides. Attached to the north eastern side of the enclosure, is a c.10-metre (33 ft) square annexe also with an earth and stone wall, utilising part of the earlier farmstead.
	Univallate prehistoric defended enclosure, hollow way and secondary enclosure	Enclosure	Claughton 54.0910°N 2.6547°W	Lancaster	Overlooking the River Lune, 250 metres (820 ft) north of Claughton Hall is a D-shaped univallate defended enclosure c.58 by 57 metres (190 ft × 187 ft) across, surrounded by an up to 9-metre (30 ft) ditch and bank. An oval terraced area at the centre of the enclosure is thought to be a hut circle or hut platform. An entrance in the north-west side aligns with a 10–15-metre (33–49 ft) wide hollow way which descends the hill. On the west side of the enclosure is a 70-by-45-metre (230 ft × 148 ft) sub-rectangular secondary enclosure also with a slight ditch.
The Church of St Thomas the Martyr, Upholland	Up Holland Priory	Building	Up Holland 53.5400°N 2.7212°W	West Lancashire	The remaining standing ruins of the Benedictine priory are on the South side of the present Church of St Thomas the Martyr at Up Holland, which served as the priory's church in the Middle Ages. A religious college existed on the site before the priory was built.
	Warren at Everage Clough	Earthwork	Cliviger and Habergham Eaves 53.7684°N 2.2303°W 53.7664°N 2.2288°W 53.7672°N 2.2284°W	Burnley	On either side of Everage Clough, 450 metres (1,480 ft) north-east of New Copy Farm, is a medieval rabbit-breeding warren. It consists of eight pillow mounds, the longest 20.7 metres (68 ft), each surrounded by a shallow ditch. No records are known to exist about the warren, but it is presumed to be connected with Towneley Hall a little way to the north-east.
Warton Crag Quarry	Warton Crag small multivallate hillfort	Fort	Warton 54.1492°N 2.7789°W	Lancaster	The summit of the hill is the site an ancient, approximately 3.2-hectare (7.9-acre) enclosure. It was defended by rock scarps and steep slopes to the south and west with triple stone ramparts forming an arc on the other sides. The scheduling classifies it as a small Iron Age multivallate hillfort, however in 2016, research by Historic England proposed that the structure was instead a non-defensive in nature, possibly dating to the Late Bronze Age.
The Old Rectory at Warton	Warton Old Rectory	Building	Warton 54.1443°N 2.7683°W	Lancaster	Across the street from St Oswald's Church are the ruins of an early 14th-century stone house that was formerly the rectory. It was a ruin by 1721, but considered to be well preserved with the gables surviving to almost full height. It is also a Grade I listed building.
Whalley Bridge	Whalley Bridge	Bridge	Billington and Langho & Whalley 53.8187°N 2.4072°W	Ribble Valley	Whalley Bridge spans the River Calder and its core is thought to be ancient. First mentioned in 1317, in 1634 an order to rebuild the bridge was made. A major overhaul was completed in 1917 when it was widened on both sides and the traditional pointed cutwaters replaced with rounded ones.
Whalley Abbey near Billington	Whalley Cistercian abbey	Building	Whalley 53.8212°N 2.4131°W53.8201°N 2.4103°W	Ribble Valley	In 1296 the Cistercian monks from the unfortunate Stanlow Abbey moved to this site, next to the River Calder. Construction of the abbey slowly continued through 12th and 13th centuries, and it was dissolved at the Dissolution of the Monasteries. Like Sawley, the last abbot was executed for his part in the Pilgrimage of Grace. Afterward a large house was built on the site and many of the abbey's buildings were demolished, however remains of the two gateways, the north wall, the east and south ranges of the cloister, the abbot's lodging, and a chapel survive. It is also a Grade I listed building.
The site of Whittington Castle	Whittington motte and bailey castle	Castle	Whittington 54.1806°N 2.6151°W	Lancaster	St Michael's Church has been constructed within the bailey of a Norman motte-and-bailey castle, overlooking the floodplain of the River Lune. The oval-shaped motte survives within the churchyard, its diameter approximately 52 metres (171 ft) at the base and it is 3.6 metres (12 ft) high. There are burials on the motte and it is surmounted by a sundial. The castle was one of several similar fortifications along the Lune valley. The church, sundial and graves are all excluded from the schedule.
	Witton Old Hall medieval lordly residence	Building	Blackburn 53.7407°N 2.5105°W	Blackburn with Darwen	The ruins of a manor house and associated farm, on the north bank of the River Blakewater downstream of the Feniscliffe Bridge in the south-west corner of Witton Country Park. The building is believed to date from around to 1544, however as the manor (part of the Honour of Clitheroe) dates to the 13th century, the site could contain earlier remains.
Clapper Bridge Over Wycoller Beck	Wycoller Bank House Bridge	Bridge	Trawden Forest 53.8463°N 2.0989°W	Pendle	Also called the Clam Bridge, it is formed from a single 3.65-metre (12 ft) slab of millstone grit. It spans Wycoller Beck, supported by rudimentary piers in each bank. The bridge is not possible to accurately age, it could be over 1,000 years old, but a 15th- or 16th-century date is more probable. It is also a Grade II* listed building.
Wycoller Hall Ruins	Wycoller Hall	Building	Trawden Forest 53.8490°N 2.1038°W	Pendle	Wycoller Hall dates back to the end of the 16th century, and was extended several times. The Cunliffe family settled at the estate in the early 17th century and after the last member of the family died, heavily endebted, in 1819 it was abandoned as a residence. It is also a Grade II* listed building.
Hall Bridge over Wycoller Beck	Wycoller Hall Bridge	Bridge	Trawden Forest 53.8490°N 2.1044°W	Pendle	Also known as Druids’ Bridge or Weavers’ Bridge. It is a basic clapper bridge structure of two big gritstone slabs supported by a central pier and the banks of Wycoller Beck. Also undateable, it may have been originally constructed in the 16th or 17th century. To repair the bridge after a fracture of the eastern clapper, an additional pier has been added. It is also Grade II* listed.
Packhorse Bridge over Wycoller Beck	Wycoller packhorse bridge	Bridge	Trawden Forest 53.8494°N 2.1043°W	Pendle	Double-arched packhorse bridge over Wycoller Beck, from the 17th century or earlier. Also known as Sally's Bridge (named after a member of the Cunliffe family who lived in Wycoller Hall in the 1900s). It is also a Grade II* listed building.

== See also ==
- Grade I listed buildings in Lancashire
- Grade II* listed buildings in Lancashire
- Scheduled monuments in Greater Manchester
