= Portfield Hillfort =

Hillfort in Lancashire, England

Coordinates: 53.8151°N 2.3875°W

Portfield
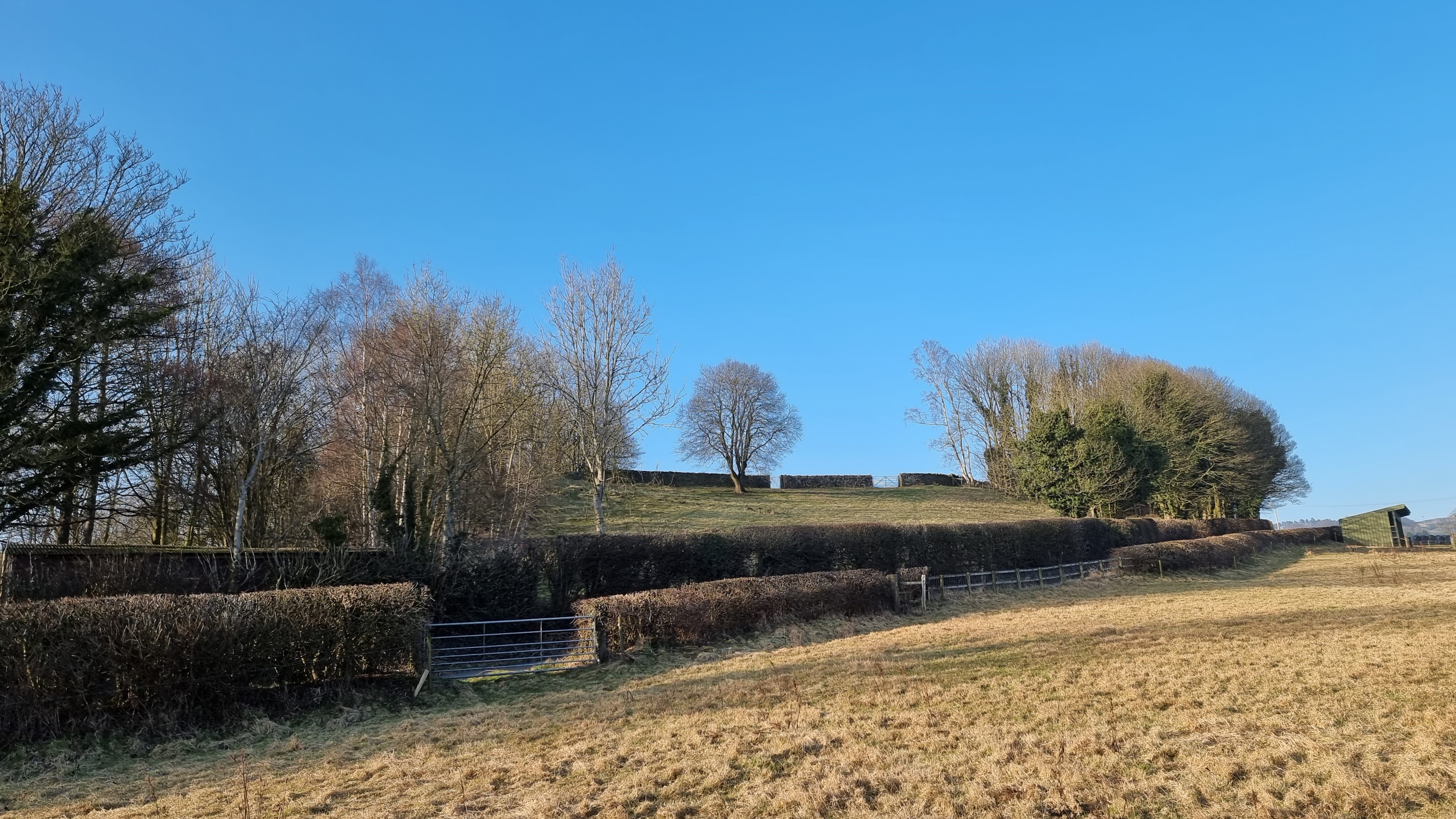
- viewed from the southeast

- Location within the Borough of Ribble Valley
- Type: Hillfort
- Location: Ribble Valley, Lancashire, England

Site notes
- Height: 1.5 m (4 ft 11 in)
- Length: 165 m (541 ft)
- Width: 110 m (360 ft)
- Area: c.1.4 ha (3.5 acres)
- Excavation dates: 1957, 1960s, 1970s

Scheduled monument
- Official name: Portfield hillfort
- Designated: 9 October 1981
- Reference no.: 1013608

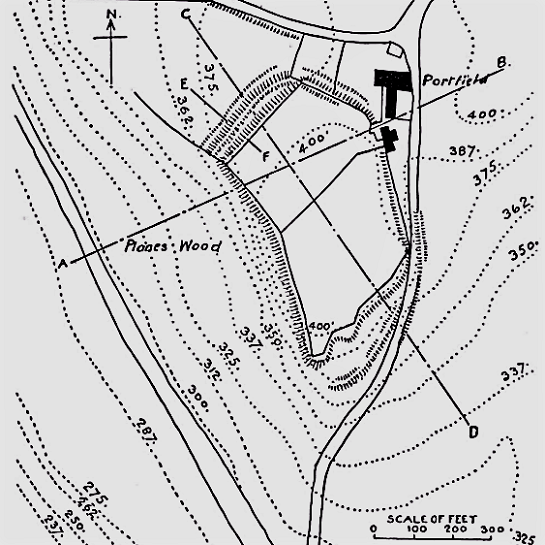
Published in The Victoria History of the County of Lancaster Vol 2 (1906)

Portfield also known as Planes Wood Camp is a late Bronze Age or Iron Age hillfort situated close to the town of Whalley in Lancashire, Northern England. It is thought to have originally been constructed as a univallate structure and then modified into a small multivallate one sometime after.

It is located on a slight promontory overlooking the valley of the River Calder, with the ground falling particularly rapidly to the west. A flat, possibly artificially levelled area measuring approximately 165 by 110 metres (541 by 361 ft), appears to have originally enclosed by a single rampart, with a least one entrance on the northern side. The irregularly-shaped site, with an area a little over 1.4 hectares (3.5 acres), is 120 metres (400 ft) above sea level. The surrounding land slopes fairly steeply on the southeast, and little less so on the northwest sides, while to the northeast the drop is only slight. No evidence remains of a bank on the western side and it could be that the slope here, which is most extreme on the upper 15 metres (50 ft), may have been considered defence enough.

Generally the defences have not survived well, but at the northwest corner where they are best preserved, there is a section of triple bank and ditch up to 1.5 metres (4 ft 11 in) high, thought to represent later modifications.

Today the site is protected as a scheduled monument, but it was not until 1981. Starting in the 1950s, the Haweswater Aqueduct was constructed through the site. As part of the work, limited archaeological excavation undertaken in 1957, discovered a section of cobbled pavement at the entrance and pottery dated to the second century AD. In 1966, workmen laying an additional pipeline across the hillfort, discovered a hoard of nine Bronze Age artefacts including a gold bracelet and lock ring. Additional small digs in the 1960s and 70s recovered finds dating from the Neolithic period through to Middle Ages.

Planes Wood is an area of woodland on the steep slope to the west. Since at least the 16th century, the name Portfield has been attached to a farm at the northeast edge of the site. The English word 'port' may have been borrowed from the Latin portus, a possible meaning of which is haven or refuge.

Historic England consider Portfield to be a rare example in north west England of a univallate hillfort subsequently modified to become multivallate.

== See also ==
- Scheduled monuments in Lancashire
