= Castercliff =

Hillfort in Lancashire, England

Coordinates: 53.8417°N 2.1823°W

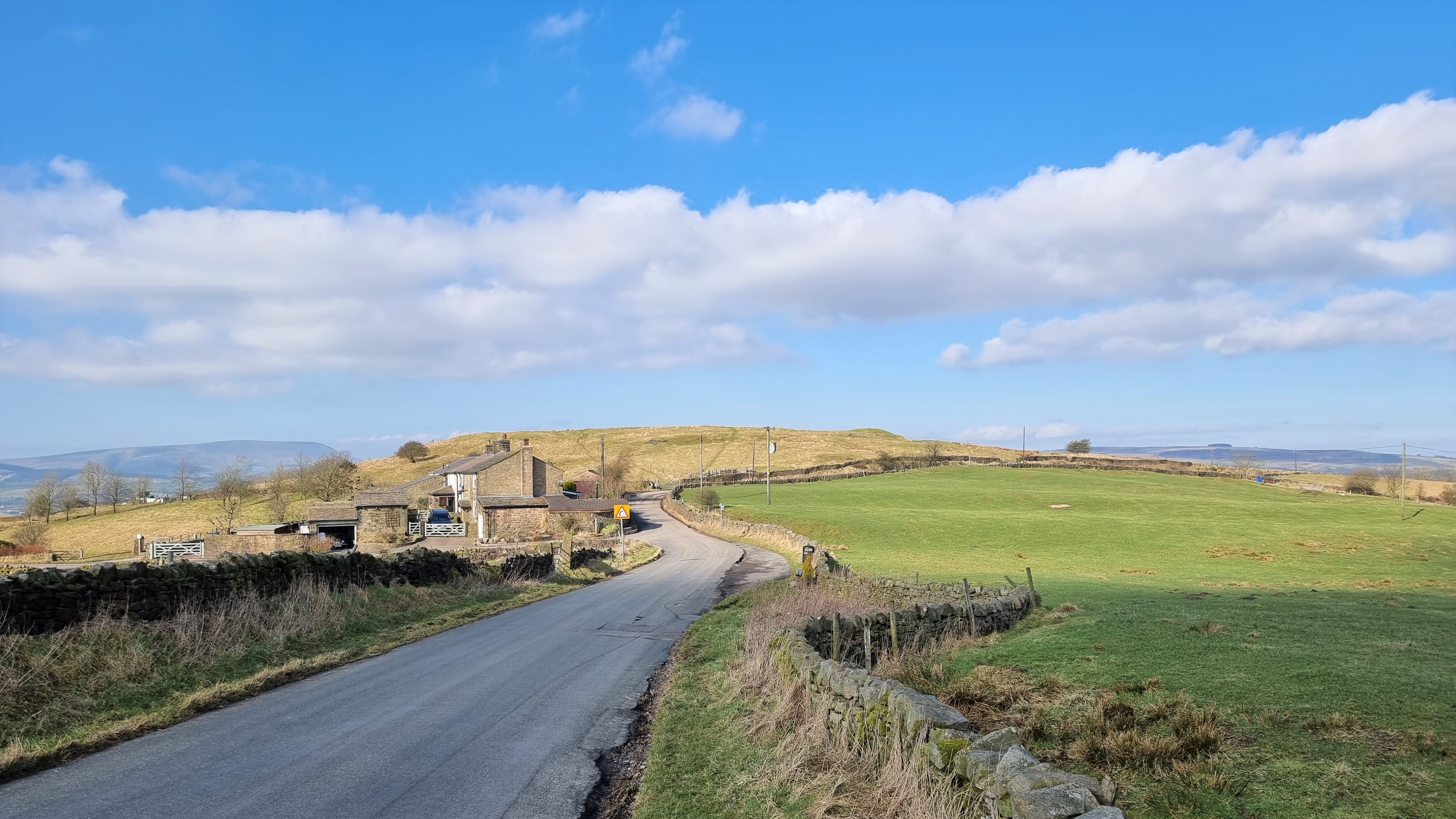
- Viewed from Back Lane

- Location within the Borough of Pendle
- Type: Hillfort
- Location: Pendle, Lancashire, England

History
- Built: 510±70 BC

Site notes
- Height: 1.5 m (4 ft 11 in)
- Length: 115 m (377 ft)
- Width: 76 m (249 ft)
- Area: 0.80 ha (2.0 acres)
- Excavation dates: 1971

Scheduled monument
- Official name: Castercliff Small Multivallate Hillfort
- Reference no.: 45247

Castercliff is an Iron Age multivallate hillfort situated close to the towns of Nelson and Colne in Lancashire, Northern England.

== Setting ==
It is located on a hilltop overlooking the valley system of the River Calder and its tributaries, on the western edge of the South Pennines. On the upper part of the hill, triple rubble ramparts up to 1.5 metres (4 ft 11 in) high, separated by ditches of similar depth, surround the site on all sides except the north. On this side the defences consist mainly of a single rampart and ditch, but some short lengths of triple rampart and ditch are also found here. The inner rampart may have been timber-laced and revetted with stone and enclosed an oval area measuring approximately 115 by 76 metres (377 by 249 ft).

The summit of the hill is 280 metres (920 ft) above sea level and the surrounding ground falls rapidly on all sides except the south east. Here a neck of land, dropping 18 metres (60 ft) from the summit, connects it to similarly high ground about 370 metres (1,200 ft) away. Streams spring from either side of the ridge and the deep valleys which they have cut, especially on the south, offer additional defence.

== Excavations ==
Excavations during the 1970s appear to show that the site was not completed, and no evidence of occupation was unearthed. However, in the past, evidence of Roman occupation has been found and in 1898, Harry Speight was in no doubt that the site was the Roman Colonio.

== Status ==
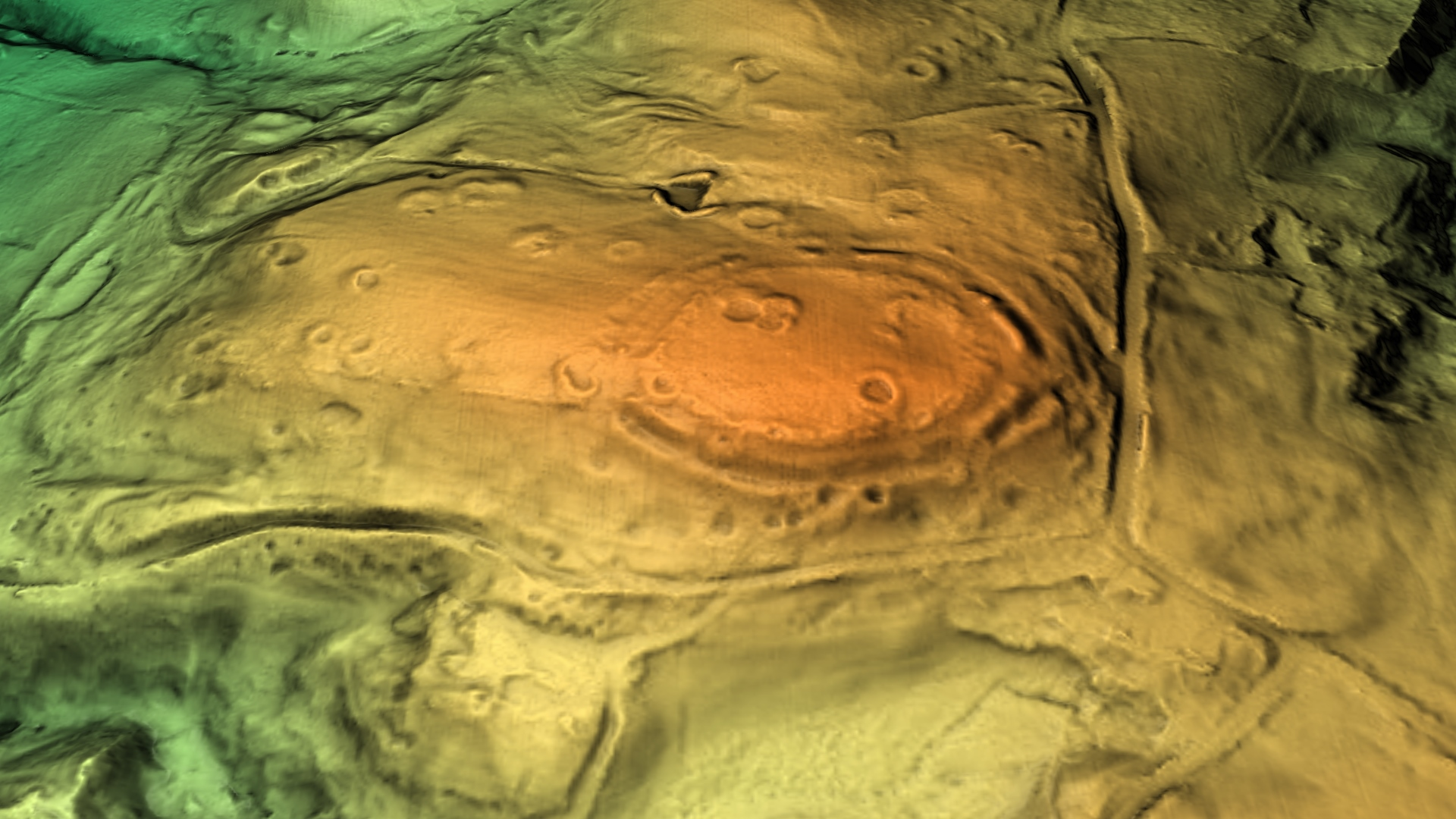
3D view of the digital terrain model

The hillfort has been damaged by coal mining with old bell pits evident both inside and around the site.

The site is a Scheduled Ancient Monument.

== Media gallery ==
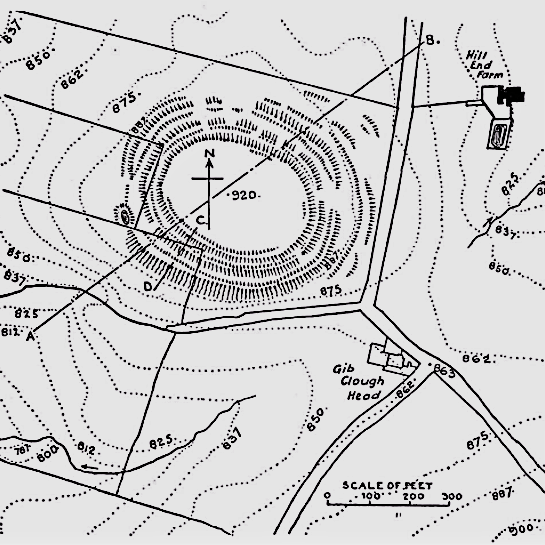
Published in The Victoria History of the County of Lancaster Vol 2 (1906)

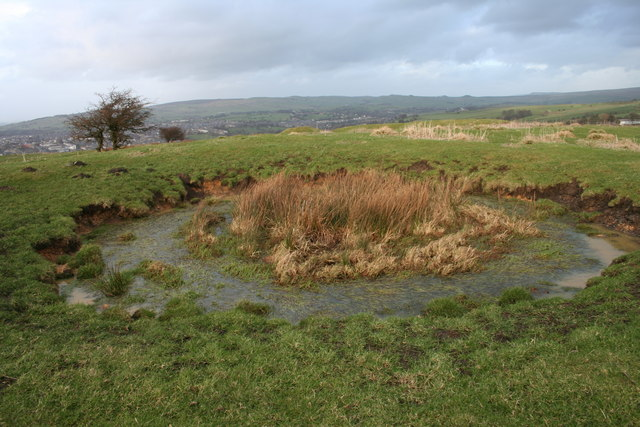
One of the many bell pit circles on top of the fort

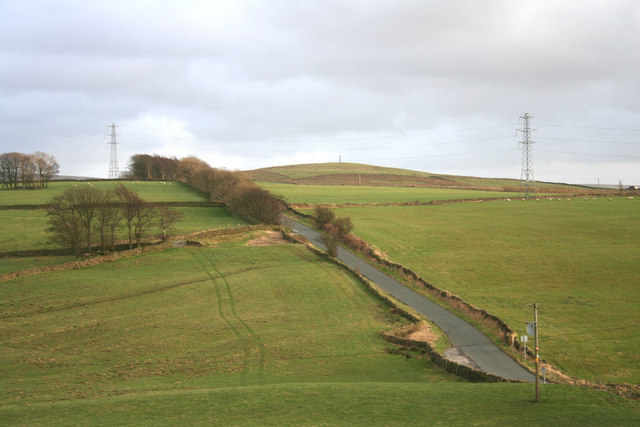
The view from the summit toward Walton's Spire to the southeast

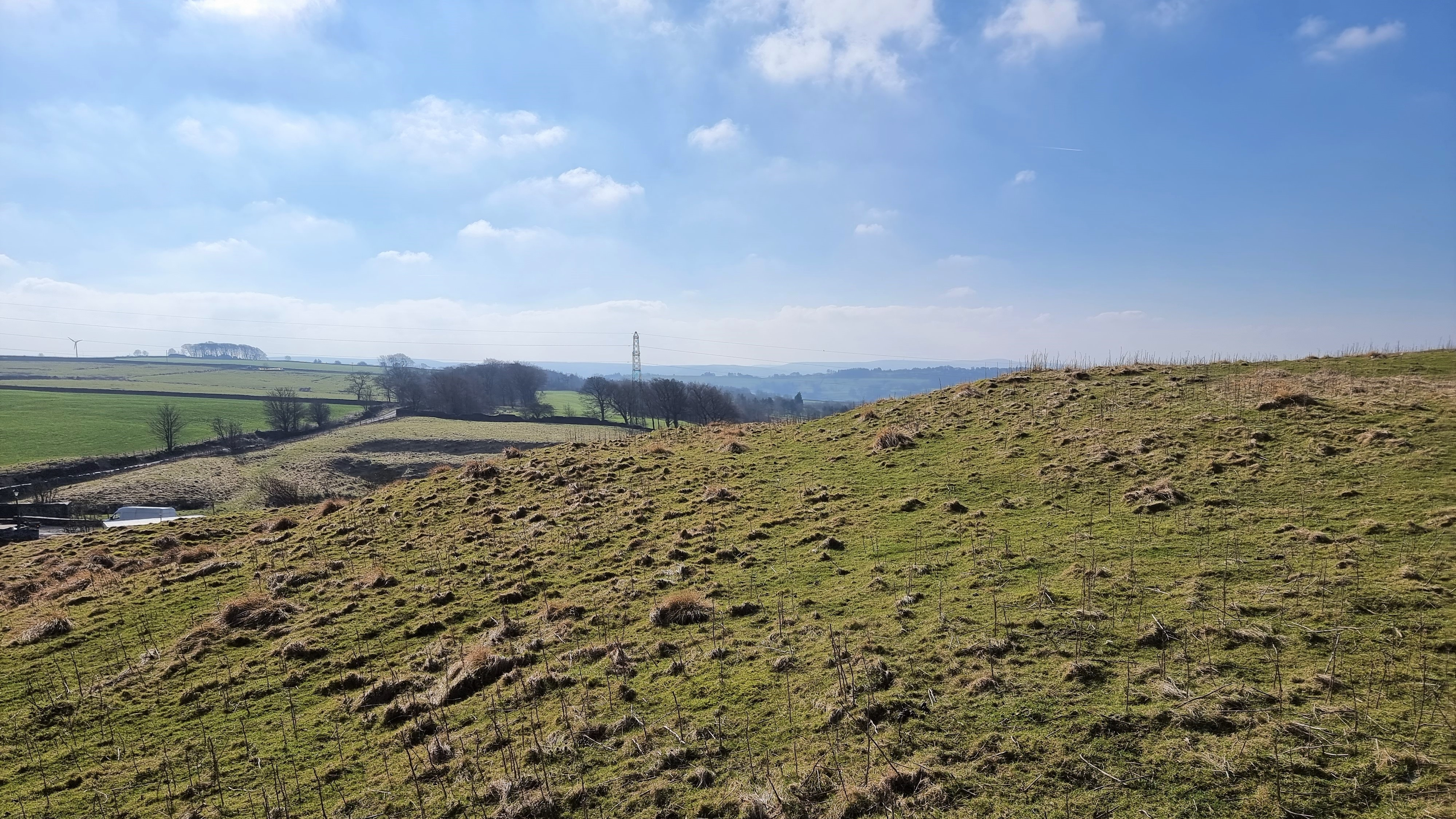
On the eastern slope looking southwest, showing a section of the ramparts

== See also ==
- Scheduled monuments in Lancashire
