= Samuel Clegg =

English civil engineer (1781–1861)

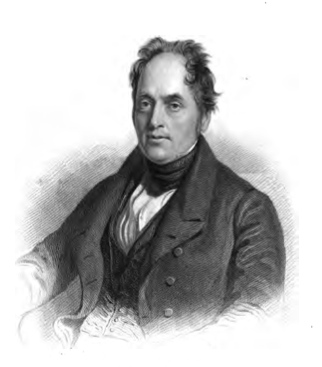
- Portrait of Clegg,The Mechanics' Magazine, 1835.
- Born: 2 March 1781; Manchester, England
- Died: 8 January 1861 (aged 79); Haverstock, London
- Resting place: Highgate Cemetery
- Children: Samuel Clegg (born 1814)

Samuel Clegg (2 March 1781 – 8 January 1861) was a British engineer, known mostly for his development of the gas works process.

== Biography ==
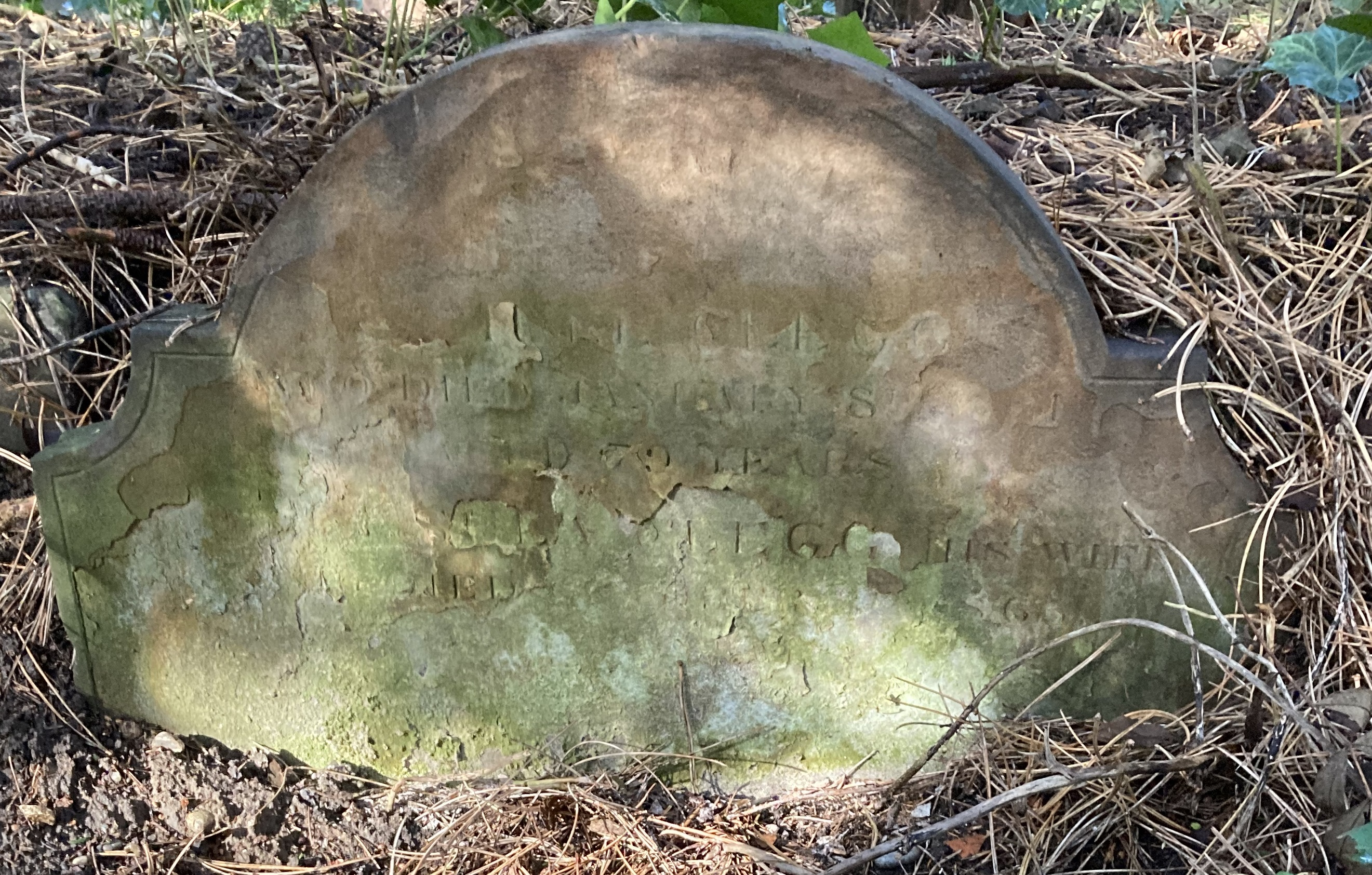
Grave of Samuel Clegg in Highgate Cemetery

Clegg was born at Manchester on 2 March 1781, received a scientific education under the care of Dr. Dalton. He was then apprenticed to Boulton and Watt, and at the Soho Manufactory witnessed many of William Murdoch's earlier experiments in the use of coal gas. He profited so well by his residence there that he was soon engaged by Henry Lodge to adapt the new lighting system to his cotton mills at Sowerby Bridge, near Halifax; and finding the necessity for some simpler method of purifying the gas, he invented the lime purifiers. He installed gas lighting at Thomas Hinde's worsted mill in Dolphinholme, Lancashire.

After removing to London, he lighted in 1813 with gas the establishment of Rudolph Ackermann, printseller, 101 Strand. Here his success was so pronounced that it brought him prominently forward, and in the following year he became the engineer of the Chartered Gas Company. He made many unsuccessful attempts to construct a dry meter which would register satisfactorily; but in 1815 and again in 1818 he patented a water meter, — the basis of all the subsequent improvements in the method of measuring gas.

For some years he was actively engaged in the construction of gasworks, and in advising on the formation of new gas companies; but then joined an engineering establishment at Liverpool, in which he lost everything he possessed, and had to start he career again.

He was afterwards employed by the Portuguese government as an engineer, and in that capacity reconstructed the mint at Lisbon, and executed several other public works. On his return to England railway works engaged his attention, but unfortunately he became involved with the atmospheric system of propulsion with the Samuda Brothers. The failure of their system as a practicable plan of locomotion was a great blow to him, and he never after took any very active part in public affairs.

He was appointed by the government one of the surveying officers for conducting preliminary inquiries on applications for new gas bills, and he occupied his spare time in contributing to the elaborate treatise on manufacture of coal gas published by his son Samuel in 1850. He became a member of the Institution of Civil Engineers in 1829, and took a prominent part in the discussions at its meetings.

He died at Fairfield House, Adelaide Road, Haverstock Hill, Middlesex on 8 January 1861 and was buried on the western side of Highgate Cemetery.
