= Samuel Clegg (born 1814) =

British civil engineer (1814–1856)

- Born: 2 April 1814
- Died: 22 July 1856 (aged 42); Putney
- Occupation: Civil engineer
- Father: Samuel Clegg

Samuel Clegg (2 April 1814 – 22 July 1856) was a British civil engineer.

Clegg was the only son of Samuel Clegg. He was employed as an assistant engineer on the Greenwich, Great Western, and Eastern Counties (afterwards the Great Eastern Railway) lines, and as resident engineer on the Southampton and Dorchester Railway in 1844. In 1836, he had made a trigonometrical survey of part of the Algarve Region in Portugal. In 1849, he was appointed professor of civil engineering and architecture at the College for Civil Engineers in Putney, and in the same year lecturer on civil engineering to Royal School of Military Engineering, the latter post he held until his death in 1856.

In 1855, the British Government sent Clegg to Demerara in British Guiana to report on the sea walls there, and to superintend their restoration. He was author of a treatise on coal gas, 1850.

Cleg died in Putney, Surrey, 25 July 1856 at age 42. He had a wife and young children. At the time of his death, Clegg was devising a plan for removing all the gas manufactories in London to a location on the Essex shore.
