= Dolphinholme Worsted Mill =

Dolphinholme Mill
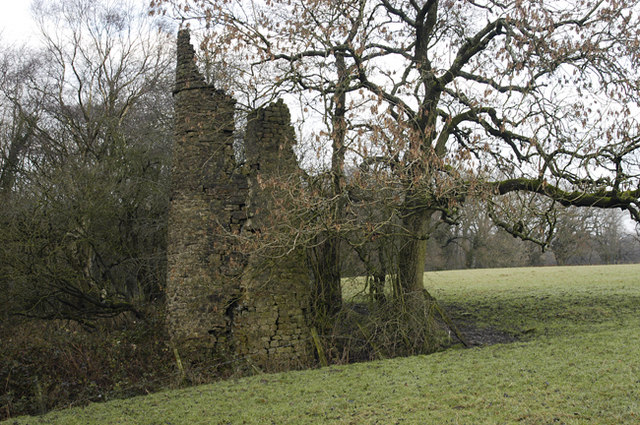
- Remains of the chimney

- Location within the Borough of Wyre Location within the City of Lancaster district

Spinning mill
- Location: Dolphinholme, Nether Wyresdale, Wyre, Lancashire, England
- Coordinates: 53.9737°N 2.7330°W

Construction
- Built: 1795
- Completed: 1795

Dolphinholme Worsted Mill is a textile mill located in the village of Dolphinholme, Lancashire. The Worsted Spinning Mill was built in 1795 by Thomas Hinde (junior), a slave trader who had followed his father, Thomas Hinde (senior), into that business before establishing the mill. Samuel Clegg installed gas lighting in the mill in 1811. The remains of this are considered the oldest remnants of a water-filled gas holder tank.

In 2020 the remains of the building received scheduled monument status.

== Gallery ==
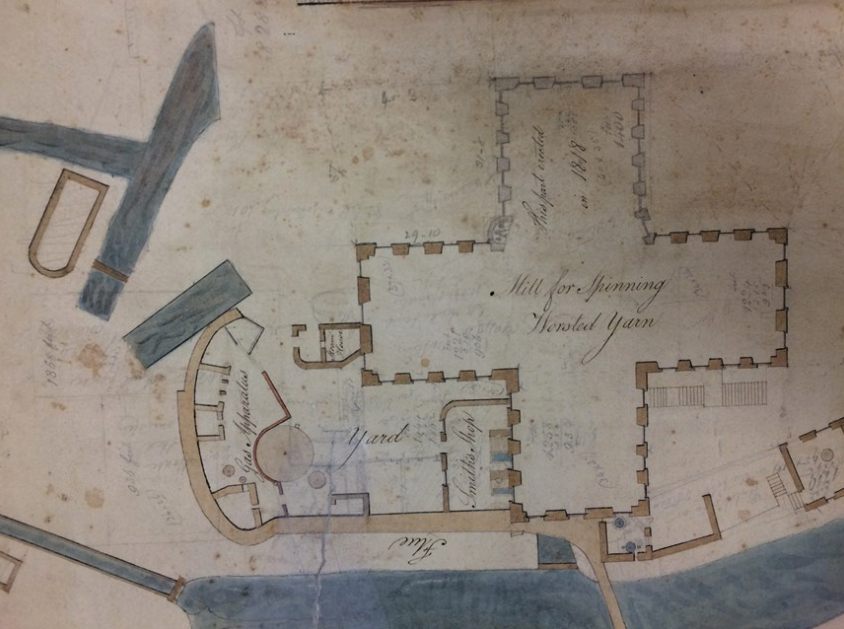
Plan of the mill

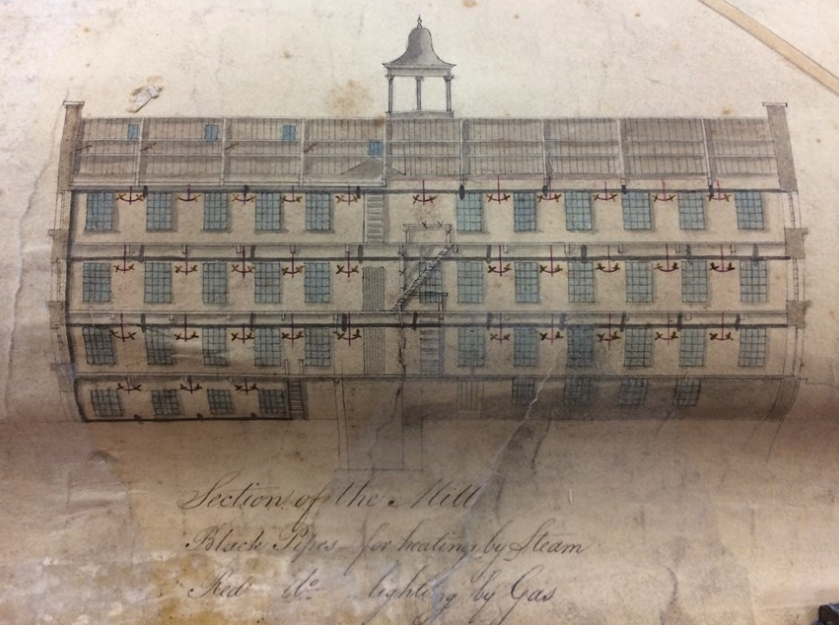
Section diagram

== See also ==
- Scheduled monuments in Lancashire
