= Lock ring =

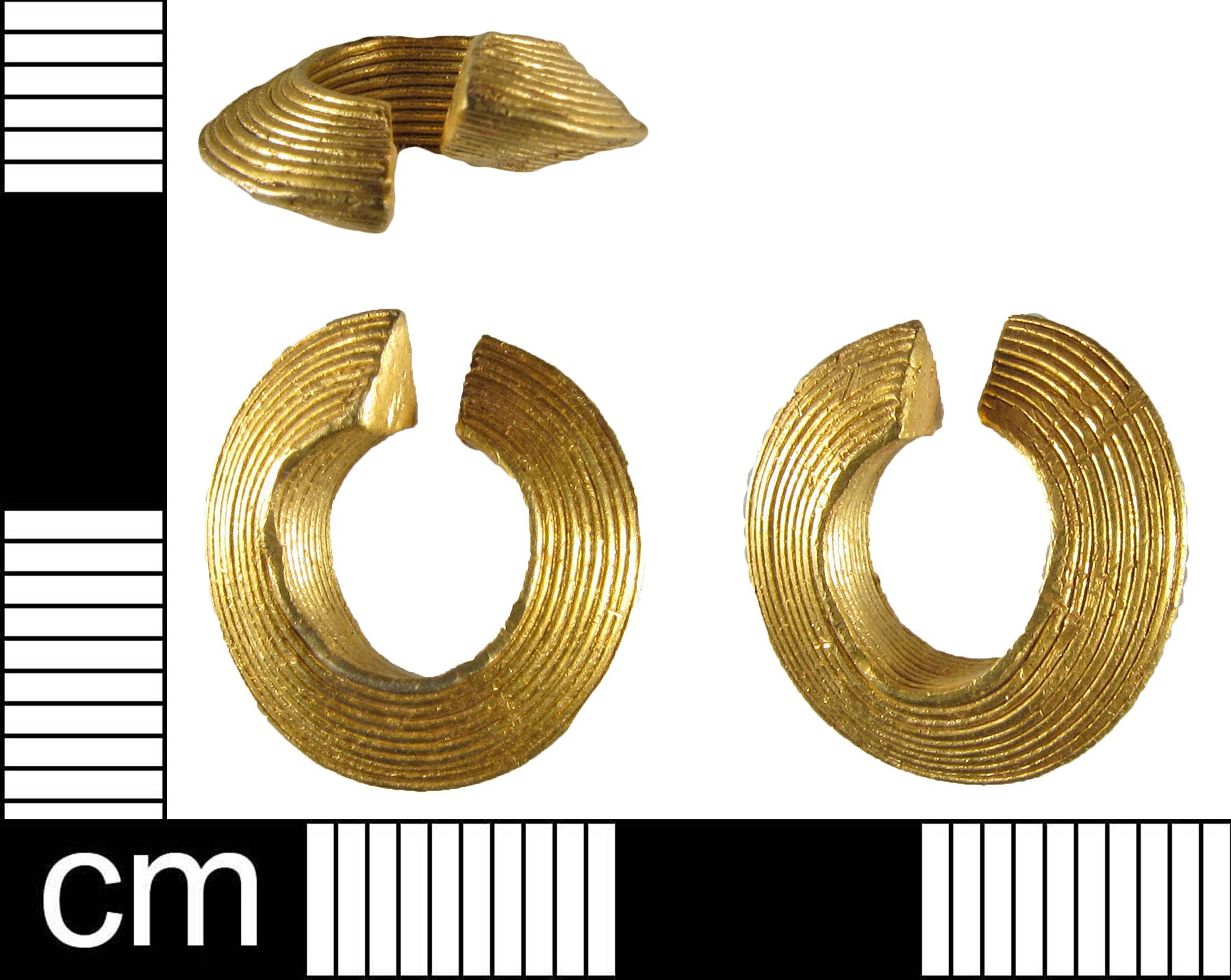
A lock ring found in Rutland, Britain, c. 1150 - 800 BC. Weight: 4.12g

A lock ring, also spelled lock-ring, is a late Bronze Age penannular (incomplete ring) hair ornament. Typically in gold, the intricate, decorative jewellery is recognized for its highly skilled workmanship. The name is derived from its suggested use as a hair fastener. Lock rings most likely originated in Ireland in the mid-eighth century B.C. They continued to be manufactured in Ireland, primarily in the River Shannon area into the seventh century B.C. Lock rings from the late Bronze Age have also been found in Great Britain and France.

== Description ==
A lock ring is a hollow, penannular metal ornament with a central opening. The ring consists of a triangular cross-section, closed with a binding-strip. The ring was typically constructed from four pieces: a split metal tube, two gapped triangular shaped face-plates and a circular binding strip. Most lock rings are made in gold, although some rings are crafted in bronze or composite materials. Bronze lock rings are primarily found in France, and were generally manufactured locally.

The face-plates are plain or decorated with concentric lines, hatching or triangles. Many of the face-plates are made from sheet gold, a small number have been made from individual gold wires soldered together. The outer edge of the face-plates are typically held together by a binding strip made of the same material as the face-plate. The diameter of the ornament varies from 18mm to 100mm.

== History ==
The late Bronze Age gold ornaments known as 'lock rings' were first recognized by archaeologists in the mid-19th century. They were described in scholarly publications as 'objects of unknown use', 'bullae', 'hair pendants', 'double-conical beads', 'hair-rings' and 'lock-rings'. The lock ring most likely originated in Ireland by the middle of the eighth century B.C. and continued to be produced in Ireland into the seventh century B.C. Several lock rings, along with other highly crafted gold objects, have been found in the River Shannon area in Ireland, in north Munster. The distribution of lock rings is divided into four major geographical groups: Ireland, North Britain, South Britain and France. Distribution of lock-rings outside of Ireland occurred by two different routes: northwards to Wales and northeast England and Scotland, and south-eastwards to southeast England. The lock rings found in Europe were concentrated in northwestern France.

During the late Bronze Age, finely made gold objects were important items of status and wealth. They are of particular interest to scholars because of the intricacy and skilled workmanship used by Bronze Age goldsmiths. According to archaeologist, George Eogan, "Like the gold bar torcs of an earlier phase, the lock-rings demonstrate the innovating tendency of the goldsmith, and the strength of the insular, especially the Irish, late Bronze age industry during its mature and final phase."

== See also ==
- Torc
- Gold lunula
- Gold working in the Bronze Age British Isles
- List of Bronze Age hoards in Britain
