= Naeem Ashraf =

Pakistani cricket umpire and former player

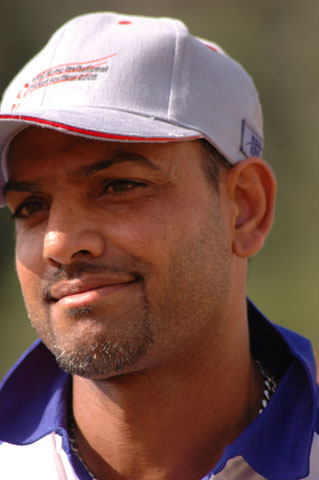

Personal information
- Full name: Naeem Ashraf
- Born: 10 November 1972 (age 54); Lahore, Punjab, Pakistan
- Batting: Left-handed
- Bowling: Left-arm fast-medium
- Relatives: Jasmine Naeem (wife)

International information
- National side: Pakistan (1995)
- ODI debut (cap 97): 07 April 1995 v India
- Last ODI: 11 April 1995 v Sri Lanka

Domestic team information
- Years: Team
- 1987/88–1989/90: Lahore City
- 1992/93—1999/00: National Bank of Pakistan
- 1993/94–1998/99: Lahore City
- 2000/01: Lahore Whites

Umpiring information
- FC umpired: 16 (2023–present)
- LA umpired: 33 (2022–present)
- T20 umpired: 23 (2023–present)

Career statistics
Competition	ODI	FC	LA
Matches	2	86	92
Runs scored	24	3,009	1,047
Batting average	24.00	26.16	19.38
100s/50s	0/0	5/10	0/4
Top score	16	139	65*
Balls bowled	42	14,375	4,271
Wickets	0	289	97
Bowling average	–	24.12	30.27
5 wickets in innings	0	17	0
10 wickets in match	0	3	0
Best bowling	–	7/41	4/45
Catches/stumpings	0/–	47/–	27/–
- Source: Cricinfo, 05 October 2026

Naeem Ashraf (نعیم اشرف) is a Pakistani cricket umpire and former cricketer who played two One Day International matches in 1995. Naeem is a left-arm fast-medium bowler and a left-handed batsman.

Naeem now plays for Clitheroe Cricket Club in Lancashire, England. Naeem is a fully qualified cricket coach and coaches on behalf of the Lancashire Cricket Board. In 2010, Naeem became a qualified ACO Umpire a step which he was very proud of achieving. Naeem enjoys being part of Cricket, whether it is being a Cricketer, Coach or an Umpire.

== Family, education, and personal life ==
Naeem is married to Jasmine Naeem, who is also an umpire, the pair officiated together in a match between Western Storm and Loughborough Lightning in 2022.

== Cricket career ==
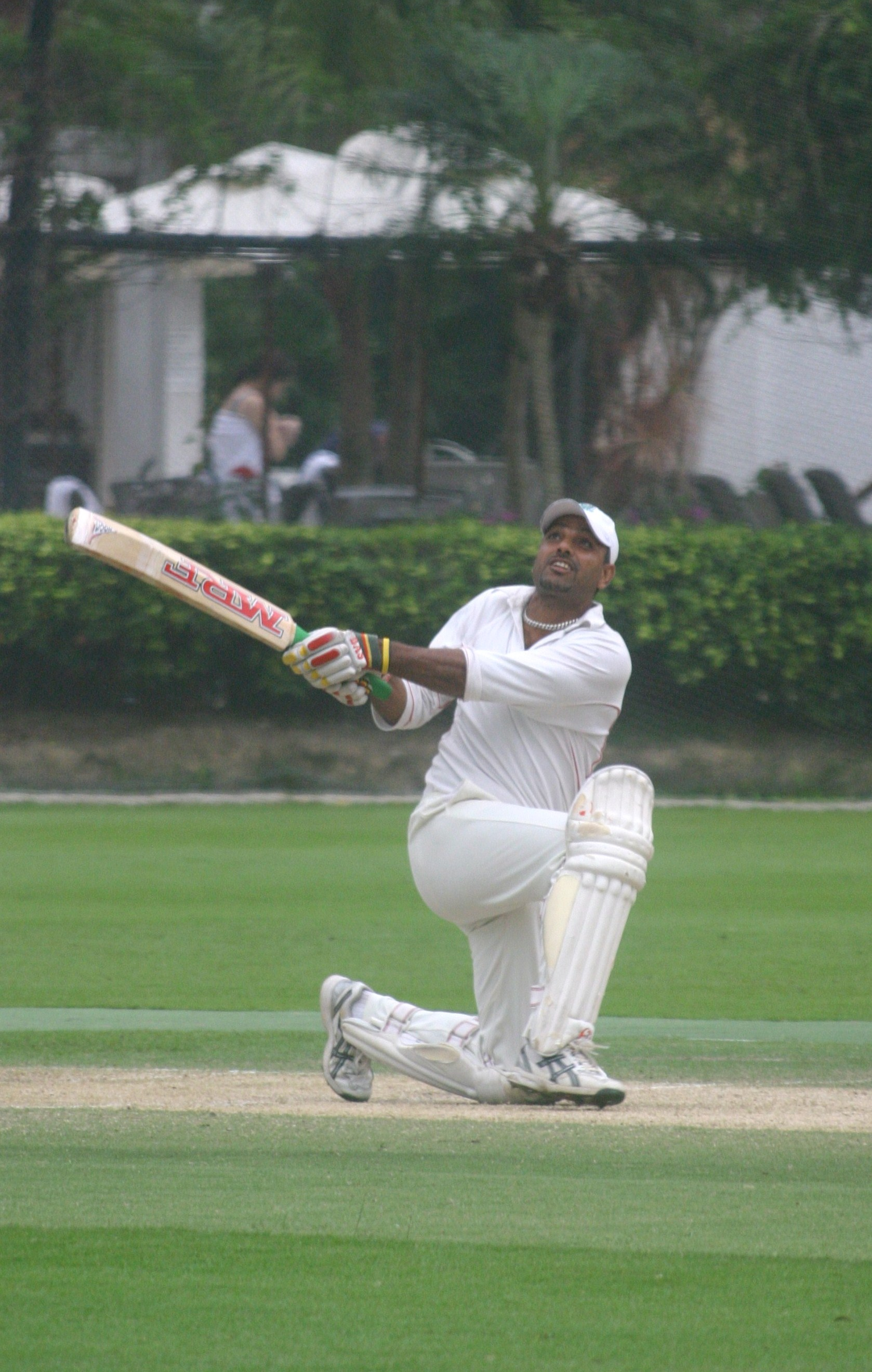
Naeem Ashraf while batting

In 1995, Naeem joined Read Cricket Club in Read as their professional cricketer. Then in 1997 Naeem joined Cherry Tree Cricket Club in Blackburn as their professional. He then went on to play for CTCC for over seven years, departing in 2003. Naeem even helped CTCC in winning their first double League and Cup win making it in the history book for CTCC in 1997 . During the seven years CTCC played six cup finals, winning three finals and two League Championships .

In 2004, Naeem joined Little Lever Cricket Club in Bolton. Following on, in 2005 and 2006 Naeem joined Clitheroe Cricket Club in Clitheroe. They went on to become Treble Winners in 2006, winning the League Championship, the Twenty20 and the Ramsbottom Cup. They were also the runners up for the League championship in 2005. Naeem also got the opportunity to play alongside his dearest friend Shahid Nawaz.

Naeem then joined Blackburn Northern Cricket Club in Blackburn in 2007. Naeem became the captain of the team and helped BNCC in winning their first League Championships and Ramsbottom Cup ever. At the annual Ribblesdale League's Senior League Trophy and Ramsbottom Cup presentation night Naeem was awarded the Senior League player of the year and best batting award, a night which Naeem always remembers .

Then in 2008, he went on to join Blackrod Cricket Club in Bolton a season which Naeem adored very much. In 2009, for a second time Naeem joined Blackburn Northern Cricket Club again.

Then in 2010 and 2011 Naeem joined Clitheroe Cricket Club. In 2010 Clitheroe CC went on to win the Ribblesdale Cricket League once again . The win was a great achievement for Naeem, who was very proud of the determination of his team. In 2011, Naeem was asked to be the captain of Clitheroe Cricket Club a proposal which Naeem was delighted with, Naeem gratefully accepted , . Naeem knew that the season was going to be a difficult and demanding one but Naeem was always up for the challenge , . Clitheroe CC came in sixth position but Naeem was still pleased and very proud of his team, saying "We never won but there is always next season".

in 2011, he was asked to go and play the USA Open T20 cricket tournament in Miami, Florida . Accompanied with his team the Sixer Sports they headed out for the tournament. This opportunity gave Naeem the chance to meet some old friends and make some new ones along the way. Naeem played with all his heart that he was asked to take part again in 2012 in the 2nd Annual International Weekend at Palm Beach, Miami . Naeem adored the time he was given to play in Miami that he is hoping to play again in the near future.

In 2009 Naeem attended a refresher course, which assisted him to go onto do a Level 1 in Umpiring. The course inspired Naeem to progress and achieve his Level 1A in 2011. In 2013 Naeem completed Level 2 in umpiring, making him more determined to go on and complete his Level 3 in 2014.

In 2010, Naeem was given the opportunity to go and umpire in his home country of Pakistan. Naeem umpired 8 matches, which included LCA – Lahore Cricket Association matches and Inter-League cricket championships. Naeem also umpired in the Lancashire Cricket league from 2010 – 2013, These matches include umpiring for the Bolton Associations, Lancashire League, Lancashire U13/ Youth 16, 2 Day Match for U19, LCB Knock Out Cup as well as Naeem's first ECB Inter-University match. Naeem is going onto umpire in the Lancashire Cricket League in 2014.
