= Skipton bus station =

Bus station in North Yorkshire, England

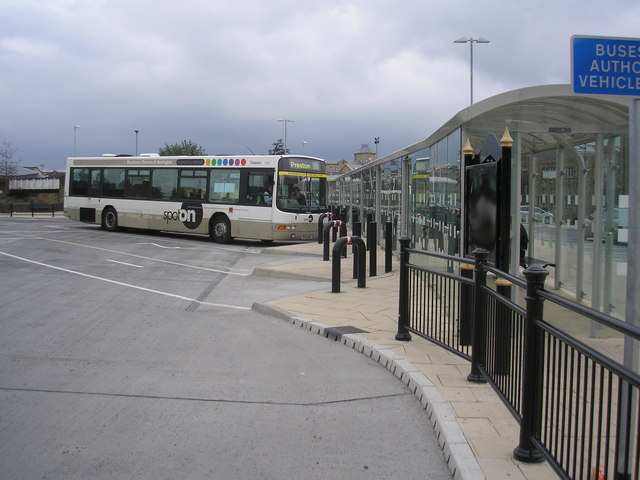
- The current bus station.

General information
- Location: Keighley Road, Skipton, Craven, England
- Coordinates: 53.95952°N 2.01904°W
- Bus routes: M6 Burnley; 66 Keighley; 75 Settle; 280 Clitheroe, Preston; 580 Settle, Kirkby Lonsdale, Lancaster; 864 Bradford, Malham; Local NYC buses
- Bus stands: 8
- Bus operators: Lonsdale Buses, North Yorkshire Council, Stagecoach Cumbria and North Lancashire, Transdev
- Connections: Skipton railway station (550 yards [500 m])

History
- Opened: 2009 (Note: Opened on the site of the old bus station.)
Location

Skipton bus station serves the town of Skipton, in North Yorkshire, England. It is situated in the town centre, just off Keighley Road, and has eight stands. The main bus operators are Transdev Blazefield, (Note: Transdev Blazefield operates locally under the Burnley Bus Company, Harrogate Bus Company and Keighley Bus Company brands.) Stagecoach Cumbria and North Lancashire, and Lonsdale Buses; services that are not sustainable on a commercial level are provided by North Yorkshire Council (NYC) minibuses.

== History ==
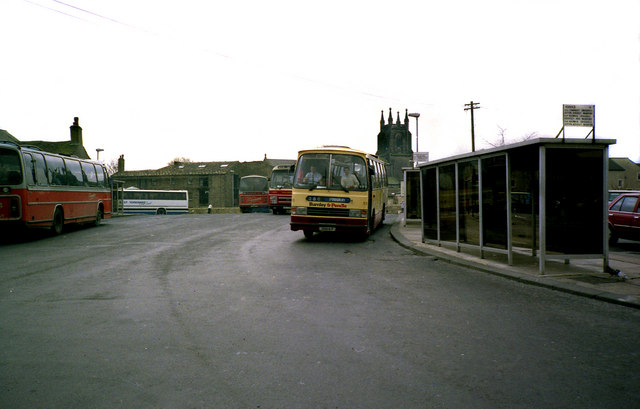
Skipton bus station prior to its redevelopment.

The original bus station was opened on 8 May 1950; (Note: Old bus timetables can be found at www.timetableworld.com/timetables.php. Search for 'West Yorkshire Road Car' and find a timetable with 'Skipton' on it.) it was named after Waller Hill Beck, a stream that runs beneath it.

A replacement was built on the same site, which opened in January 2009; North Yorkshire County Council and Craven District Council invested £1.2 million in the facility.

Pride of the Dales, Pennine Motor Services, First Leeds, National Express and Megabus formerly operated services here.

== Services ==
Skipton bus station is served by multiple routes and operators; key routes include:

- M6 is operated by Burnley Bus Company; this replaced the short lived Pendle Wizz, itself a replacement for service X43. The service is operated using a fleet of Optare Versa vehicles and connects Skipton with Barnoldswick, Colne, Nelson and Burnley.
- 12, 14, 16, 16A, 72A, 73, 78A, 210 and 211 serve the bus station and operate to local areas such as Embsay and Malham. These routes are operated by North Yorkshire Council, using minibuses.
- 59 to Harrogate is operated by Harrogate Bus Company on Saturdays; this is a DalesBus contract intended to replace service X59.
- 64 and 66 connect Skipton with Ilkley and Keighley respectively; both of these services are operated by Keighley Bus Company. Route 64 was launched as the replacement for the 784, which was first operated by First Leeds during the pandemic, but transferred to Yorkshire Coastliner in late 2020. The service was the replacement for service X84 which now runs between Leeds and Ilkley. The 66 is usually operated using a dedicated fleet of Wright Gemini 2 bodied Volvo B9TLs which transferred from Burnley Bus Company in 2021. The first vehicles dedicated to the service were a fleet of Optare Versas, which were new in 2016; these vehicles are now used on Flyer services from Leeds Bradford Airport which do not serve Skipton.
- 72 is also operated by Keighley Bus Company, connects the town with the Grassington Yorkshire Dales National Park Centre.
- 280 is the town's only daily bus link to a city, which is operated by Stagecoach Cumbria and North Lancashire; it connects the town with Earby, Barnoldswick, Clitheroe and Preston. The service used to operate to Southport before being cut back to Preston. The service would transfer from Transdev Lancashire United to Preston Bus, before passing to Stagecoach in 2019.
- 580 connects Skipton with Gargrave, Hellifield, Long Preston and Settle. Some services continues through to Kirkby Lonsdale and Lancaster.
- 864 serves the town on Sundays, connecting it with Ilkley, Guiseley, Shipley and Bradford.
- 873 runs through local villages and also connects the town to Ilkley.
