= Ultraframe =

Roofing products manufacturer

- Company type: Limited
- Founded: 1983
- Founder: John Lancaster
- Headquarters: Clitheroe, Lancashire
- Website: www.ultraframe-conservatories.co.uk

Ultraframe (UK) Ltd is a Clitheroe, Lancashire, based roofing products manufacturer. Ultraframe also use independent third party accreditation and testing agencies such as Wintech, Exova (Warringtonfire) and the British Board of Agrément. Ultraframe's conservatory roofing system carries a 25-year BBA (British Board of Agrement) life expectancy certificate and was the first in the industry to hold this accreditation.

== History ==
Established in 1983, by entrepreneur John Lancaster MBE, Ultraframe was the first conservatory company to develop a conservatory roofing system with no onsite manufacture. In 1996 Ultraframe was the first roofing system to obtain the British Board of Agrément approval for their products and in 1998 Ultraframe was floated on the London Stock Exchange.

In July 2006 Ultraframe was acquired by Latium Plastic Holdings, including the Wendland Roofing system. Latium Enterprises (LE) is the hub based in Manchester, England and New York City, US. Latium owns a number of companies in the US and UK, all of which were either wholly or materially controlled by Brian Kennedy working with partner companies.

In 2007 the Ultraframe factory was awarded UK’s Best Engineering Plant by the Cranfield Institute, and in 2009 the company won a Shingo Bronze Medallion for operational excellence.

In 2012 Ultraframe acquired the Quantal Aluminum Roofing System and launched the Loggia Premium Conservatory range that won Retail Campaign of the Year at the G Awards in the same year. In 2013, its 30th anniversary, the company launched their first solid roof product. Livinroof won Best New Product in 2014. In 2016 Ultraframe launched Ultraroof a tiled solid roof at Fitshow, this is the lightest tiled roof on the market weighing only 38 kg/m2.

In 2017 Ultraframe launched the Ultrasky Orangery, a build extension and orangery product which combines a glazed roof with insulated columns and pelmets and an integrated structural goalpost.

Ultraframe currently have over 80 patents registered.

The company currently employs around 400 people at their Clitheroe head office. Ultraframe is a member of the Glass and Glazing Federation.
