= St Michael and St John Church, Clitheroe =

Coordinates: 53.8713°N 2.3906°W

St Michael and St John Church
- St Michael and St John the Evangelist Church, Clitheroe
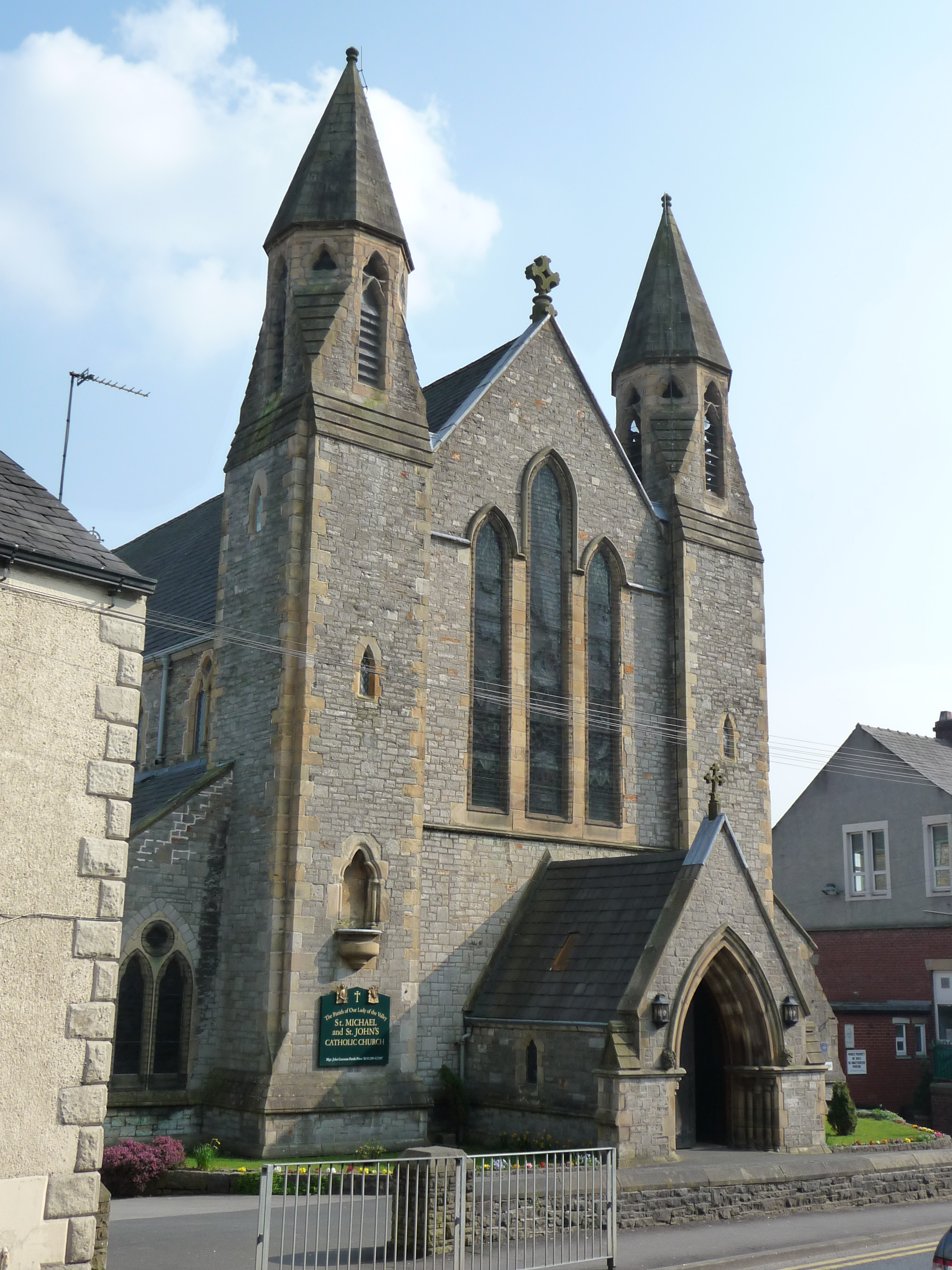
- Front entrance

- Location in Ribble Valley
- OS grid reference: SD 74412 41702
- Location: Clitheroe
- Country: England
- Denomination: Roman Catholic
- Website: OLOTV.org.uk

History
- Status: Active
- Founded: 1799; 227 years ago
- Founder: Fr John Laurenson SJ
- Dedication: St Michael, John the Evangelist
- Events: Church rebuilt 1850

Architecture
- Functional status: Parish church
- Heritage designation: Grade II

Administration
- Province: Liverpool
- Diocese: Salford
- Deanery: St John Southworth
- Parish: Our Lady of the Valley

St Michael and St John the Evangelist Church is a Roman Catholic parish church in Clitheroe, Lancashire, England. It is situated on Lowergate road close to the centre of the town. It was endowed in 1799 by the Catholic philanthropist Thomas Weld (of Lulworth) and staffed by members of the Society of Jesus. When the original building became St Michael and St John's Catholic Primary School in 1850, the church moved next-door to the school. The church is recorded in the National Heritage List for England as a designated Grade II listed building.

== History ==
=== Foundation ===
Fr John Laurenson SJ first came to Clitheroe in 1794. There he started a mission to the local Catholics in the area. He resided in the nearby Stonyhurst College which was the great gift of Thomas Weld of his family seat to the recently returned English Jesuits from 200 years of European exile, and it was from there they did most of their work in the area. In 1798, Thomas Weld presented them with land on Lowergate so that they could build a church and a school. In 1799, a small chapel was built on the site. A letter was found in the 21st century in which Thomas Weld requested that the parish priest at Clitheroe say Mass annually for the repose of his and his wife Mary's souls.

=== Extensions ===
By the nineteenth century, the Catholic population was increasing so the chapel had to be extended and a school was built attached to the chapel. In 1850, a larger church was built next door for the increasing congregation and the chapel was given entirely over to the school. Twenty years later, both the school and the church was again extended. In 1897, a new school was built on the same site, but next to the original one, so that the old chapel and school building were converted into a social centre for the parish. The original 1799 church building, now part of St Michael's Primary School, is a Grade II listed building.

== Parish ==
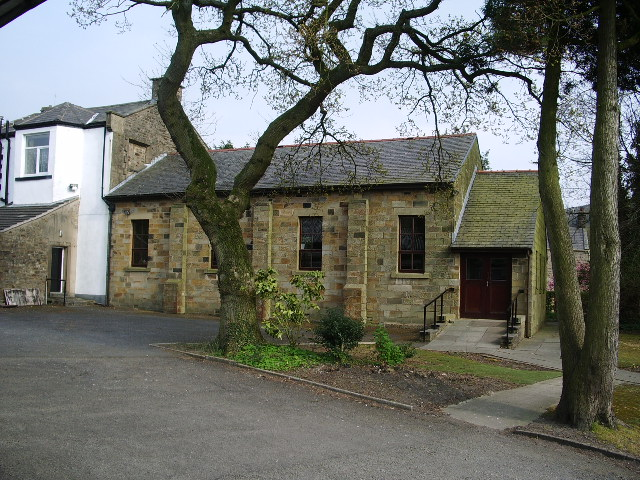
St Mary's Church, Sabden

In September 2008, the Jesuits handed the church over to the Diocese of Salford who continue to serve the parish. Two years later, the parish merged with St Mary Queen of Peace Church in Sabden to form the parish of Our Lady of the Valley. St Mary's was built in 1877 and it was made into a parish in 1909, so that the parishioners did not have to travel the sizeable distance to attend Mass in Clitheroe.

The parish has two Sunday Masses at St Michael and St John Church, one on Saturday evening at 6:00pm and the other at 9:30am on Sunday morning. There is one Sunday Mass at St Mary's Church at 11:00am.

The parish has close relationships with St. Mary's R.C. Primary School in Sabden and St. Michael and St. John's R.C. Primary School in Clitheroe, both schools state that "a good Catholic education is a partnership between home, school and parish".

== Interior ==
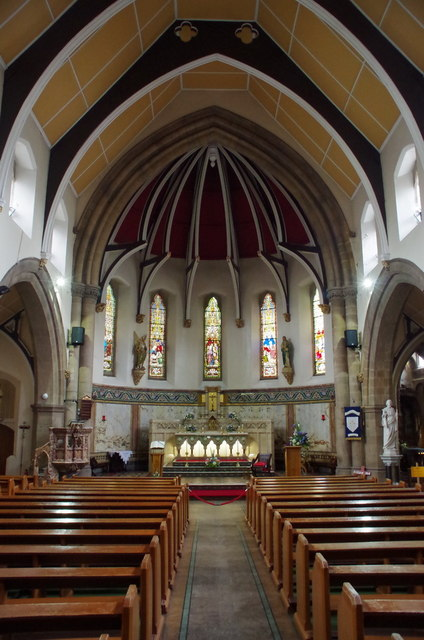
Interior

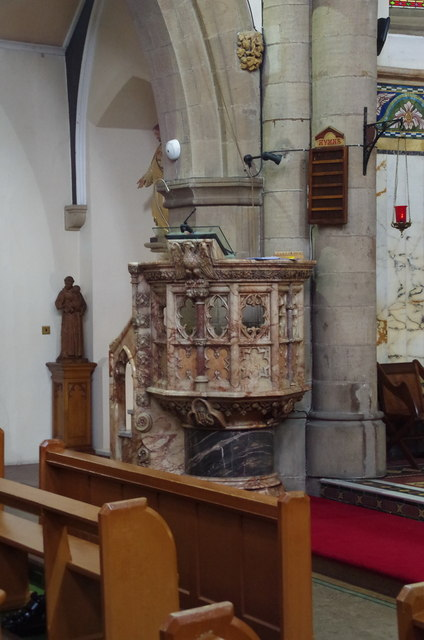
Pulpit

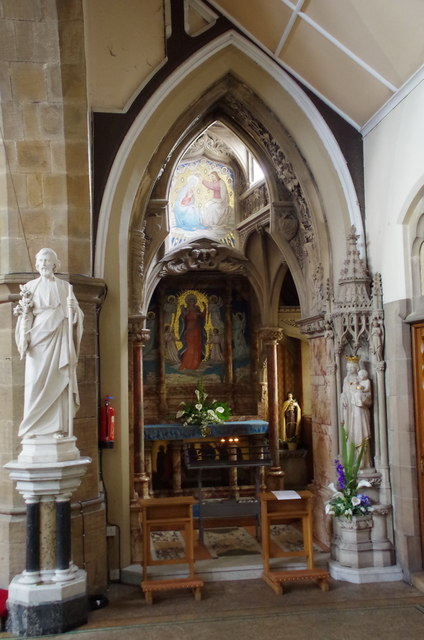
Lady chapel

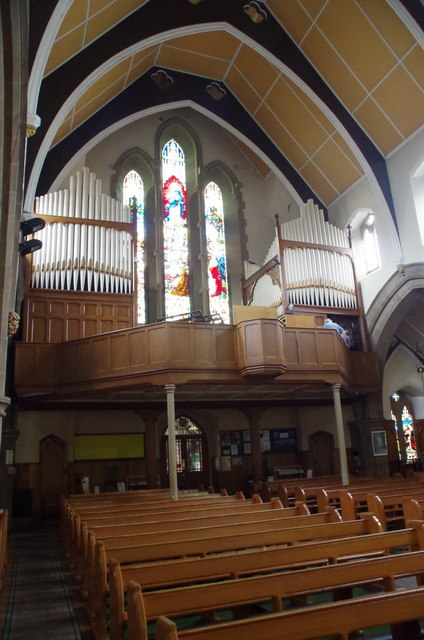
Organ

== See also ==
- Jesuit repatriation to England and Wales
