= 280 Preston–Skipton =

Bus route in England

280
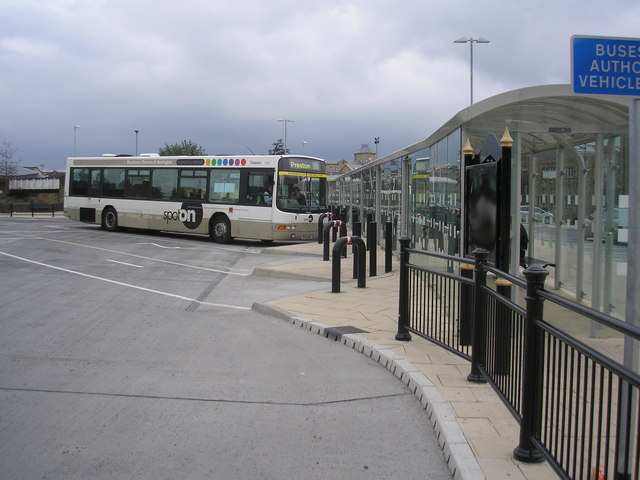
- A 280 bus at Skipton bus station

Overview
- Operator: Stagecoach Merseyside & South Lancashire
- Status: Operating

Route
- Start: Preston bus station
- End: Skipton bus station

Route 280 is a bus route in England that operates between Preston and Skipton.

== History ==
In March 2016, Transdev Blazefield withdrew from operating the route due to the withdrawal of subsidies. It was taken over by Preston Bus on a commercial basis who operated the route until June 2019. The route was taken over by Stagecoach Merseyside & South Lancashire with a £80,000 yearly subsidy from Lancashire County Council.

== Route ==
The route operates hourly between Preston and Skipton via Clitheroe.
