= Robert de Cliderhou =

Robert de Cliderhou (d. 1339?), was a Chancery clerk and pastor who was allegedly involved in the rebellion against Edward II by Thomas, Earl of Lancaster.

== Offices held ==
Cliderhou belonged to a family which had been for one or two generations settled at Clitheroe in Lancashire, and he held the manor of Bayley near that town. In 1302 some land at Aighton was conveyed to him by W. de Mitton, and in 1307 he brought an action against three brothers, Ralph, William, and Geoffrey, of Bradenull, who had assaulted him when on the king's service, and had beaten him until they left him for dead. The offenders were ordered to pay him compensation. During the reigns of Edward I and Edward II he was one of the clerks of the Chancery. When he ceased to hold that office is not stated, but from the abstract of the proceedings at his trial in 1323 (Parl. Writs, i. pt. ii. 240) we learn that he had occupied it for thirty years. In 1311 he acted as one of the itinerant justices for the counties of Kent, Surrey, and Sussex, and in the following year he was summoned, as one of the clerks of the king's counsel, to a parliament held at Lincoln. Subsequently (in 1316?) he was appointed the king's escheator north of the Trent, and seems to have retained that position for about two years.

== Support for Lancaster ==
=== Trial ===
In 1321, at the time of the outbreak of hostilities between Thomas, Earl of Lancaster, and Edward II, Cliderhou was parson of Wigan, and seems to have been an active supporter of the earl's cause. After Lancaster's defeat and execution, the king appointed Sir Robert de Malberthorpe, Sir John Stonor, Sir Hervey de Stanton, and Robert Ayleston, as commissioners to make inquisition respecting those who had been guilty of abetting the rebellion (Rolls of Parliament, ii. 406; the matter is curiously misunderstood in Baines' 'Lancashire,' ed. John Harland, ii. 172). Cliderhou was one of those who were accused by the commissioners, and he was brought to Nottingham to take his trial at Michaelmas 1323. The charges against him were that he had preached in the church of Wigan in favour of the rebel cause, telling his parishioners that they owed allegiance to the earl, and promising absolution to all who supported him; and, further, that he had sent his son, Adam de Cliderhou, and another man-at-arms, with four footsoldiers, to join the rebel army. Cliderhou is said to have met both charges with a full denial. The jury, however, found him guilty, and he was imprisoned, but afterwards released on bail, the name of his son Adam appearing in the list of sureties. In November of the same year he presented himself for judgement, and agreed to a fine of three hundred Marks.

=== Redress ===
He, however, retained his benefice, and in the reign of Edward III (the date is not stated) presented a petition for redress of his grievances. He did not on this occasion deny having furnished military aid to the earl, but pleaded that in this respect he had only done what was required of him by his duty to his feudal superior. With regard to the charge of advocating rebellion in the pulpit, he asserted that he had merely exhorted the people to pray for a blessing on the earl and the other barons of the kingdom, and for the deliverance of the king from "poisonous counsel". He further stated that in order to raise money to pay the penalty imposed upon him he had had to sell his land; he had paid two hundred Marks into the exchequer, besides thirty Marks to the queen's treasury, and Sir Robert de Leyburn, the High Sheriff of Lancashire, had levied upon him the remaining hundred Marks, but had never paid over the sum into the exchequer. The answer to this petition was that as Cliderhou had voluntarily agreed to the fine ("fit fin de gre") nothing could be done.

== Later career ==
In another petition in parliament (also of unknown date) Cliderhou asks that the burgesses of Wigan may be restrained from holding unlicensed markets, which competed injuriously with the market on Mondays, from which the parson was authorised by royal charter to receive tolls. It was answered that the parson had his remedy at common law.

In 1331 he assigned to the monks of Cockersand Abbey his manor of Bayley, where he had built a chapel dedicated to St. John the Baptist. He died in or before 1339, in which year a chantry was founded at Bayley by Henry de Clyderhowe "for the repose of the soul of Robert, late rector of Wigan". Edward Foss says that in 1334 he recovered possession of some land at Clitheroe and Dinkley; but the person to whom this statement refers is another Robert de Cliderhou, who is frequently mentioned in documents belonging to the locality. As Robert was clearly a priest, it is singular that he should have had a son bearing his surname; possibly, as Foss suggests, Adam de Cliderhou may have been born before his father took orders.
