= Swan Court Shopping Arcade =

Open-air shopping centre in Lancashire, England

Coordinates: 53.8718°N 2.3915°W

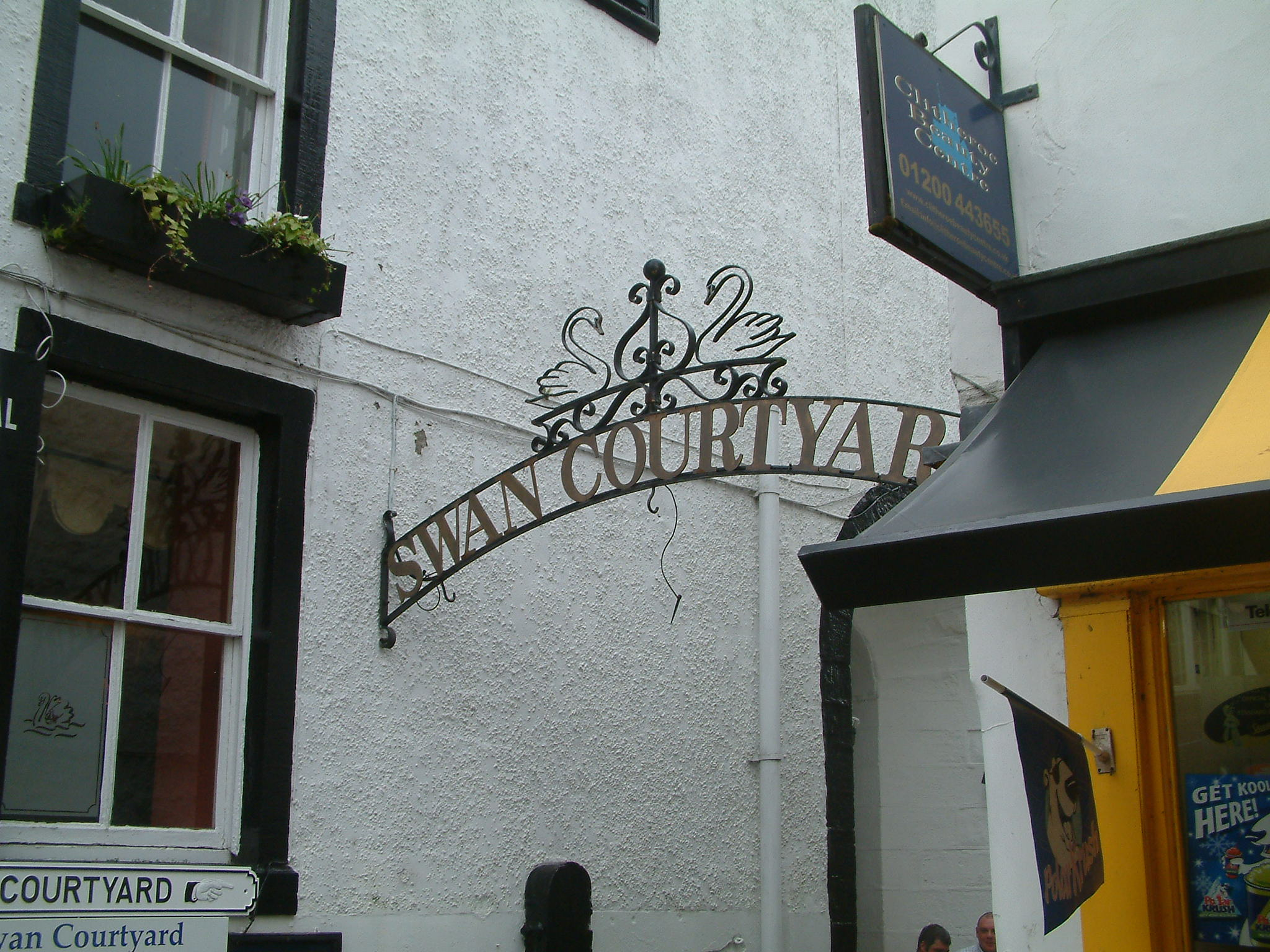
- The shopping centre in 2008
- Location: Clitheroe, Lancashire, England
- Owner: Ribble Valley Borough Council
- Num. of stores: 10
- Floors: 1

Swan Court Shopping Arcade or Swan Courtyard is an open-air shopping centre in the town of Clitheroe in Lancashire, England.

== Swan & Royal Hotel ==
The Swan & Royal Hotel is an ancient coaching inn. The Swan Courtyard used to be the stables for the Swan & Royal.

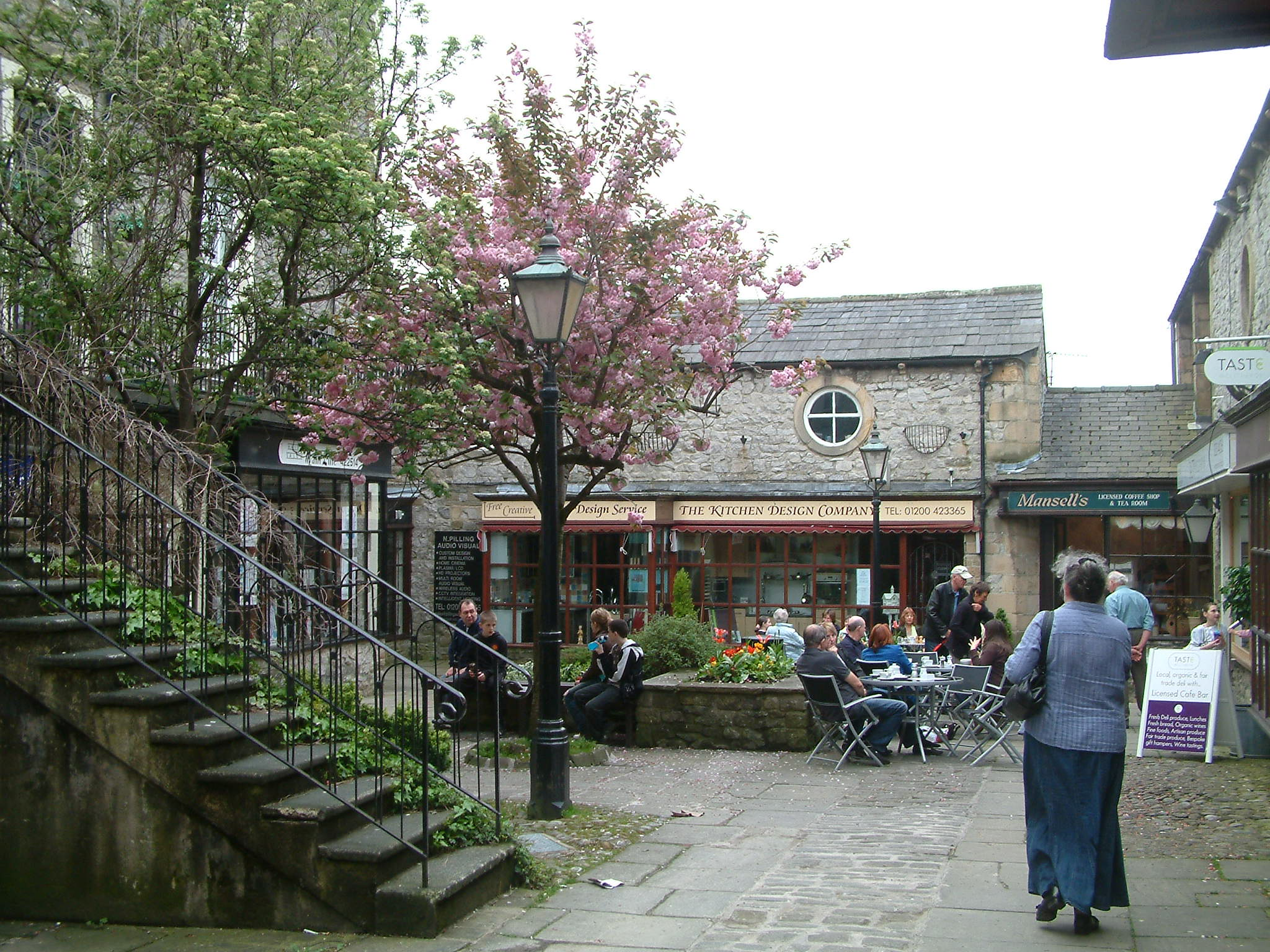
The main square inside the shopping arcade.

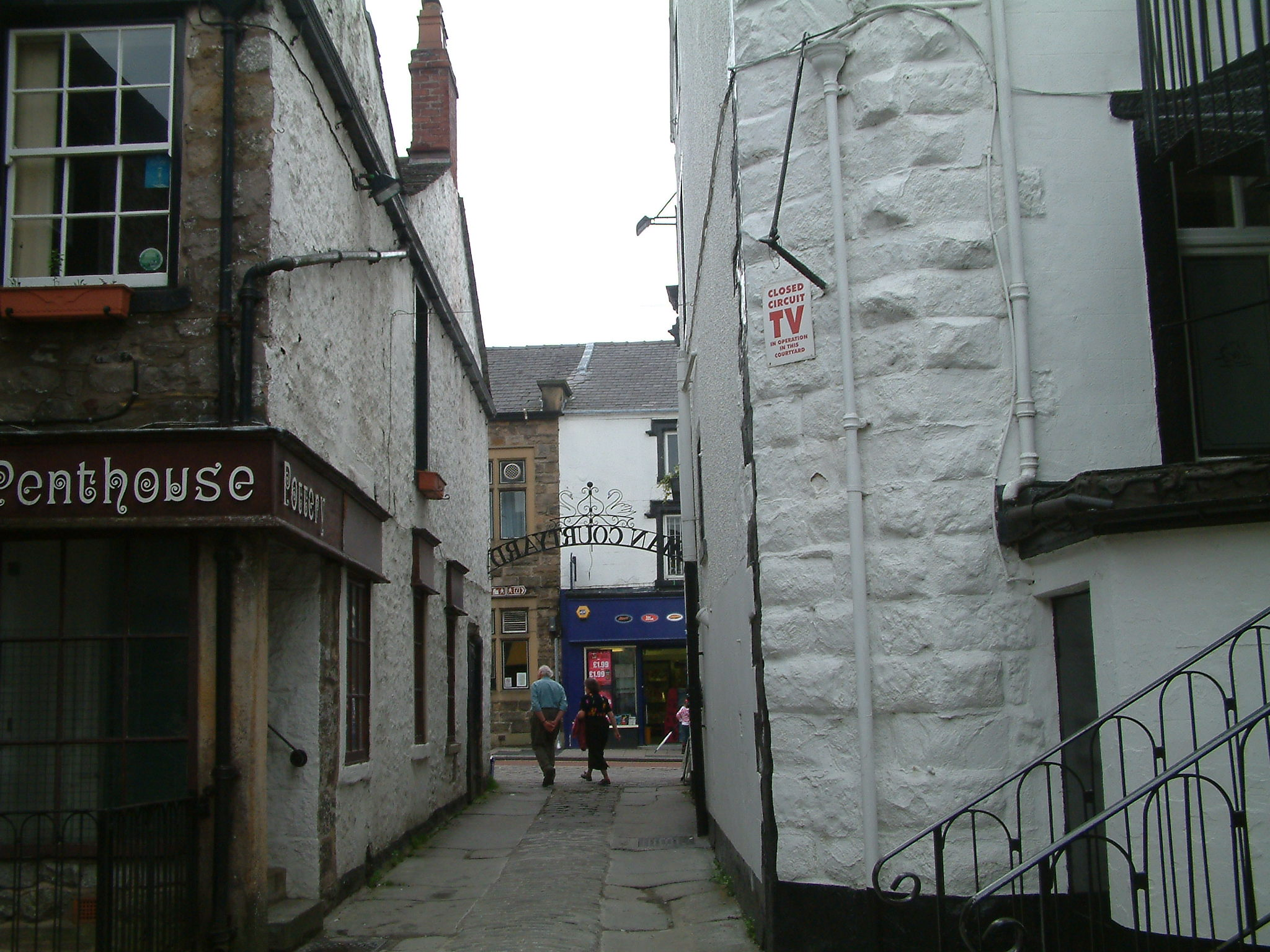
The exit out to the main street and the Swan & Royal Hotel.

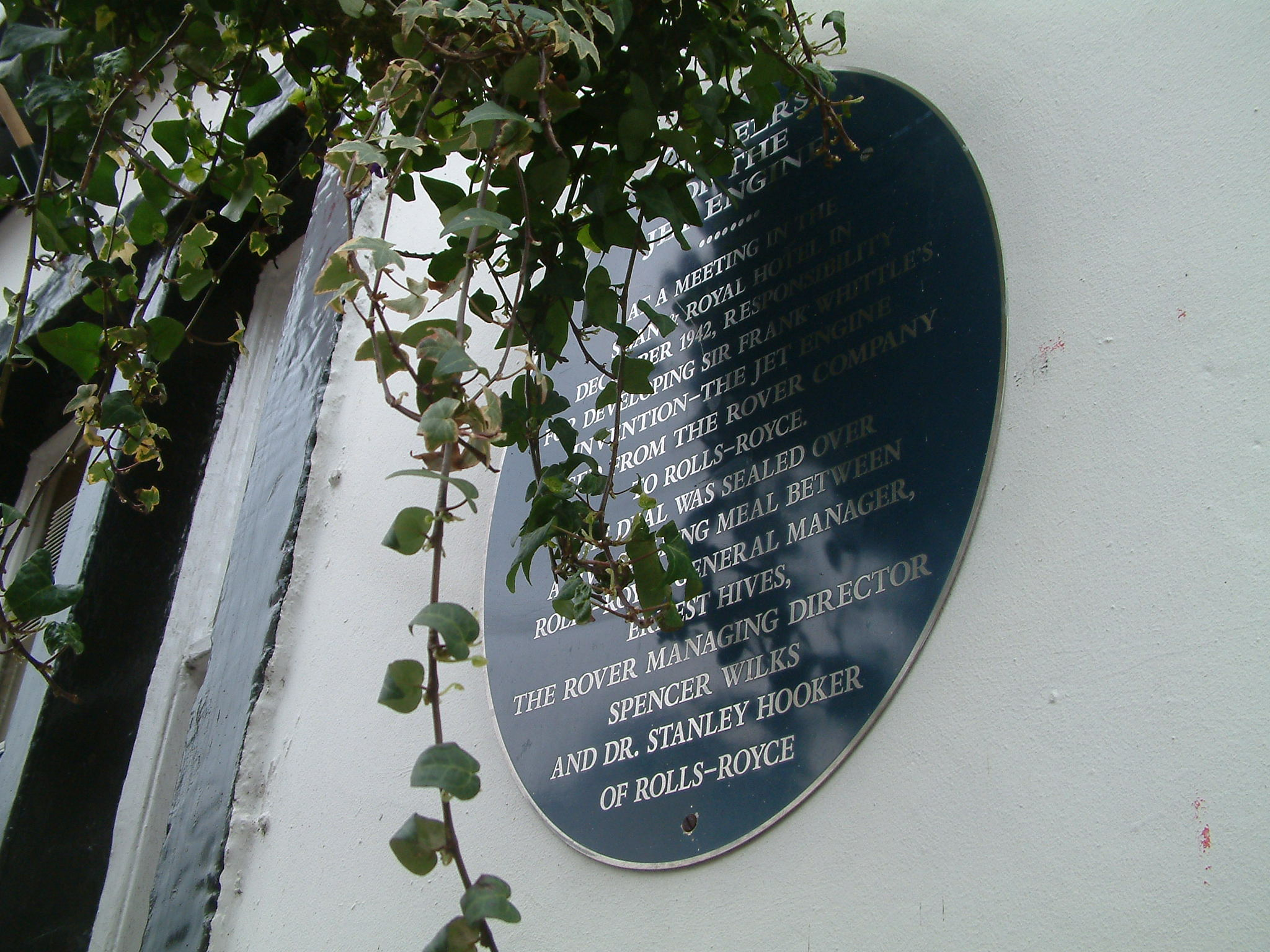
The plaque to commemorate the day Rover and Rolls-Royce came to Clitheroe.
