= British Board of Agrément =

The British Board of Agrément (BBA) is a UK body issuing certificates for construction products and systems and providing inspection services in support of their designers and installers.

== Agrément certificate ==
This is an authoritative document proving the fitness for the purpose of a construction product and its compliance or contribution to compliance with the various building regulations applying in the United Kingdom. It is commonly referred to as a 'BBA Agrément Certificate'.

== History ==
The forerunner of the BBA, the Agrément Board, was modelled on an arrangement operating in Belgium, hence the French word agrément, which translates literally as 'approval'.

The British Board of Agrément (BBA) is a construction industry approvals body, originally set up in 1966 (60 years ago) by government and offering product and installer approval. Agrément certificates cover 200 different product sectors and the largest of these are insulation and roofing. In the former the BBA has run an Approved Installer Scheme for more than 30 years, linking installations of injected cavity wall insulation to BBA approval of the systems and dealing with both the system supplier and installer. BBA approvals show compliance with Building Regulations and other requirements, including installation quality.

The BBA also inspects for the Fenestration Self Assessment Scheme (FENSA), the Federation of Master Builders and for some certificate holders to check that installers demonstrate good practice on site. The BBA also run the Highways Authorities Product Approval Scheme (HAPAS) for Highways England, County Surveyors Society and other agencies in the UK. This is similar to the Agrément Certificate process but applied to highways products. Some of these have Approved Installer schemes linked to them and the BBA also inspects those.

In March 2026, the BBA's accreditation was suspended by the UK government-appointed UKAS accreditation body and it could not issue safety certificates to building products manufacturers. BBA said the issue concerned company documentation, and said the suspension would be temporary.

== Structure and ownership ==
The BBA consists of three main operations, Product Approval and Certification, Inspection and Test Services. Ownership of the BBA is held by its Governing Board, consisting of three executive and four non-executive directors. Inspection activities are a key element of the planned business growth and recent restructuring of the BBA's Technical operation has been undertaken to focus effort and attention on it. Hardy Giesler is the BBA's CEO.

The BBA employs approximately 185 people, most of whom are based at their offices and testing facilities near Watford, and the remainder are inspectors geographically located around the UK with access to the BBA's electronic systems allowing them to work remotely.

The BBA is a company limited by guarantee - equivalent to a non-profit status used in other countries, any profits made by BBA used for the benefit of the construction industry or the public good.

== Coverage ==
The organisation has inspectors based around the United Kingdom capable of returning completed reports within 24 hours of receipt.

== Environmental policy ==
The BBA is accredited by UKAS to provide Environmental Certification to the ISO 14000 series and operates appropriate internal controls.
