= Clitheroe Cricket Club =

English cricket club

Clitheroe Cricket Club
League	Lancashire League
Ground	Chatburn Road, Clitheroe, Lancashire
Web	clitheroecricket.com
1st XI Captain	2026 - Ali Ross
Professional	2026 - Diego Rosier (SA)

Clitheroe Cricket Club is an English cricket club which plays its home games at the Clitheroe Cricket Bowling & Tennis Club ground on Chatburn Road in Clitheroe, Lancashire, England. From 2017, it plays in the Lancashire League, having resigned from the Ribblesdale League at the end of the 2016 season.

Currently there are 4 senior sides, and a junior section which fields 9 teams.

== History ==
Clitheroe cricket club had its origins in the Alhambra CC which was formed in 1860, the first organisation to call itself the towns club. The Alhambra club was so named because a circus with that title was accustomed to install itself on the field that became the cricket ground, believed to be behind the Wheatsheaf Inn on Whalley Road. In 1862, the Alhambra club joined with the local junior club – the Rifle Corps – to form Clitheroe Cricket Club. This followed a meeting at the Brownlow Arms (now the Yorkshire bank building) where the title of Clitheroe Cricket Club and a code of rules were agreed upon.

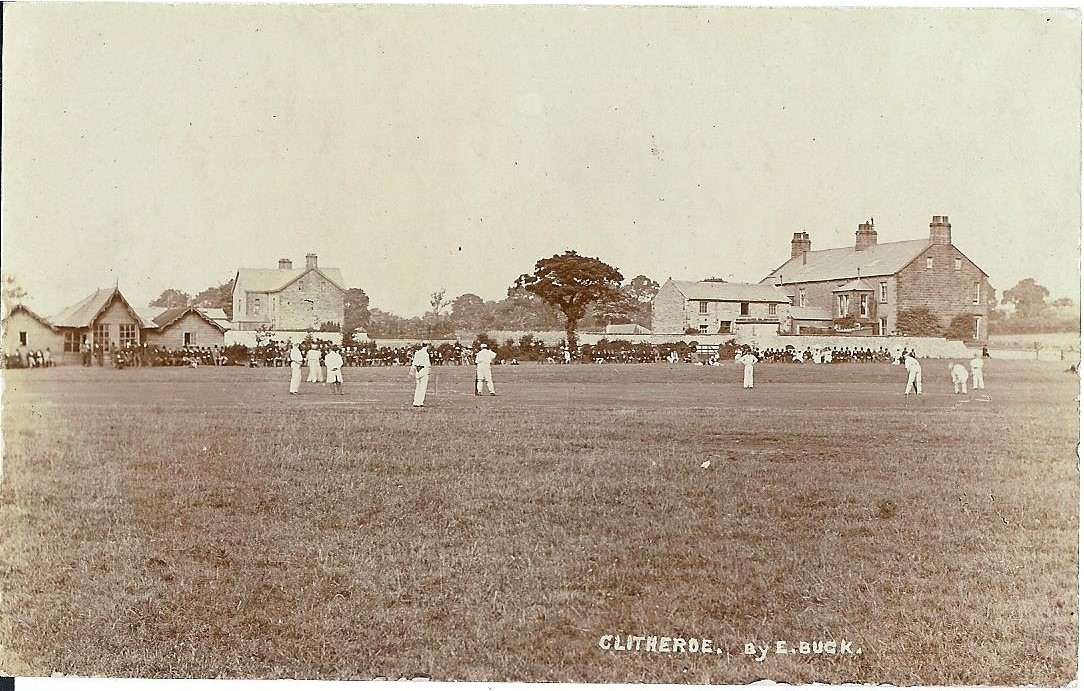
Early Photo of Clitheroe cricket club circa 1904.

A new ground was secured in Chatburn Road, not the present field, but one immediately below. The club did so well in gathering subscriptions, that after a year or two they were able to aspire to a real playing pitch, not a rented meadow, which was laid in the next field. This has been the clubs home ever since.

In the early days fixtures were against Great Harwood, Settle, Leyland, Haslingden, Bacup, Rishton, Church, Whitefield Stand (Manchester), Cob Wall (Blackburn), Eagley, Whalley, Skipton, Keighley, Sabden, Gargrave, Egerton and Calder Vale. Wickets were pitched early at 11:00am and consisted of two innings. Cricket at the time were friendly games but nevertheless, keenly fought. In 1892, the idea of league cricket with points and a championship at stake came about, due mainly in an attempt to increase crowds and revenue. Clitheroe reluctantly joined with other clubs to form the Ribblesdale League.

In 1920, the Chatburn road site was purchased by the Southworth family, who bestowed it to the club forever. In the unhappy event of the clubs extinction, the ownership of the field passes to the citizens of Clitheroe as a recreational area. The first pavilion was erected in 1862, in the form of a big tent. There were two more wooden pavilions before the present facilities were completed in 1981.

The club won the Ribblesdale League title four years in a row between 2013 and 2016. From start of the 2017 season Clitheroe, along with local rivals Great Harwood, moved to the Lancashire League.

== Honours ==
Ribblesdale League

- 1st XI -

League champions – 1899, 1901, 1904(tied), 1907, 1953, 1954, 1958, 1986, 1994, 2006, 2010, 2013, 2014, 2015, 2016
Ramsbottom cup Winners – 1965, 1986, 1987, 1988, 1993, 2006, 2016
Twenty20 winners - 2006, 2016

- 2nd XI-

League champions - 1922, 1953, 1960, 1961, 1984, 1986, 1994, 1996, 1998, 2015, 2016
Div. 2 Winners - 1968, 1971, 1981
Lawrenson Cup Winners - 1978, 1983, 2012

- 3rd XI –

Div. 3 champions – 1981, 1982, 1984, 1985, 1990, 1997, 2001, 2014, 2016

Lancashire League

- 1st XI League Winners - 1 - 2017.
- 20/20 Cup Winners - 2 - 2017. 2022
- Ron Singleton Colne Trophy Winners - 1 - 2017 (shared).
- 2nd XI League Winners - 1 - 2019.
- 3rd XI League Winners - 1 - 2017.

== Junior Section ==
Recent years have seen increased interest in junior cricket at Clitheroe and the club recognised the need for a more structured coaching programme. This needed to be delivered by appropriately qualified coaches, equipped with the latest resources and teaching aids. Consequently, over the past ten years a concentrated effort has been made to increase the number of ECB qualified coaches, in addition to adopting all the relevant Child Protection legislation and appointment of Child welfare and Protection Officers. Coaching is held every Thursday during the season.

In 2017, the club had over 150 junior members and 9 teams playing in the Lancashire League from under 9's to under 19's; The under 19's group, captained in 2017 by 1st XI opener Charlie Dewhurst, became county champions for the 3rd time, having previously achieved that honour at u13's and u15's level.
