= Clitheroe Castle Museum =

Museum in Lancashire, England

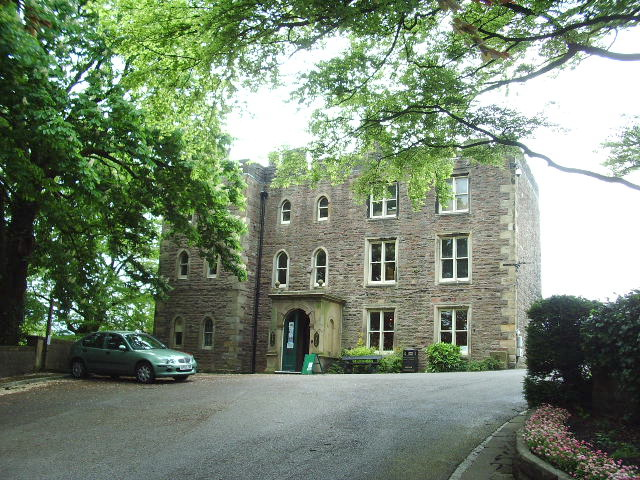
- Clitheroe Castle Museum in 2007

- Location within the Borough of Ribble Valley
- Coordinates: 53.8702°N 2.3931°W
- Website: Official website

Clitheroe Castle Museum is located in Clitheroe, Lancashire, England, in the former Steward's House, a Grade II listed building that was built in the 18th century to house the steward of Clitheroe Castle. It is a museum showing the history of the local area.

== History ==
The museum was originally opened in 1954 in the Steward's Gallery, later moving to the Steward's House.

The Clitheroe Castle Museum underwent a £3.5-million refurbishment and redevelopment and re-opened on 23 May 2009. It was officially opened on 23 June 2009 by Prince Richard, Duke of Gloucester. As part of the redevelopment, a cafe and shop were added adjacent to the museum, and the Steward's Gallery was also refurbished as an exhibition area.

The museum was named as a "Quality Assured Visitor Attraction" by VisitEngland in November 2009. The museum is owned by Ribble Valley Borough Council and operated by the Lancashire County Council. The museum is now located below the keep, and it charges only for adults to enter. The castle is freely open to the public.

Surviving original features, such as gas lights, servant's bells and fireplaces, in the Steward's House remain in place.

The museum has displays on geology, natural history, the history of the castle, Clitheroe, and the local area, as well as folklore and life in Clitheroe. It has period rooms of "The Collector's Study", based on the activities of a local collector, Frank B. Mitchell, who was one of the museum's founders; and the Victorian Kitchen. Its collection includes the locally found Mitton Hoard. The North West Sound Archive was located on the third floor of the museum; this was founded in Manchester in 1979 and relocated to Clitheroe in 1982; however it was closed in 2015.

== Paintings on display in Clitheroe Castle Museum ==
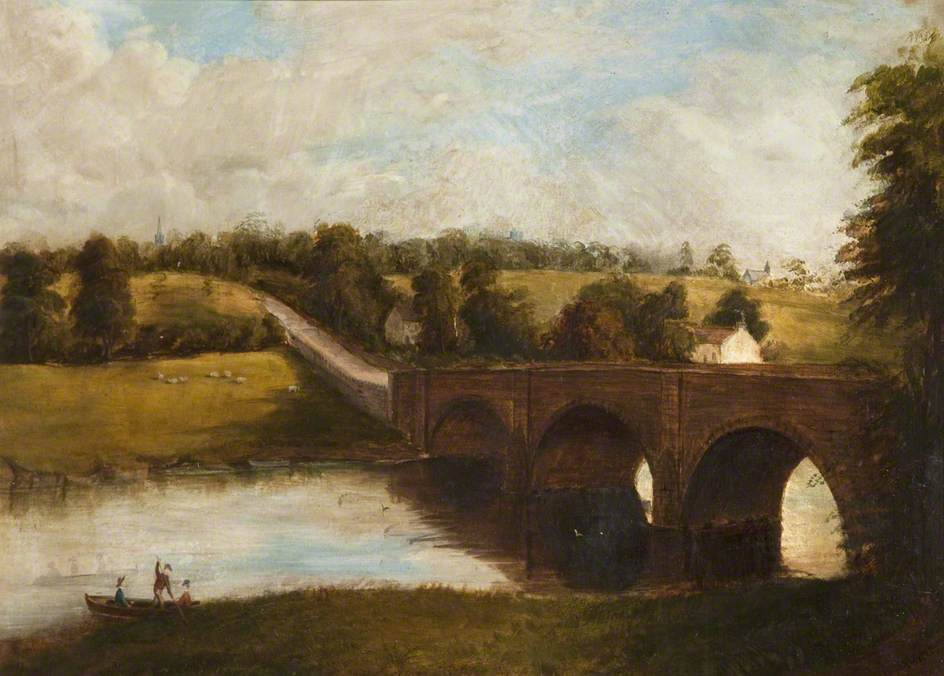
Boating at Brungerley by Benjamin Satterthwaite

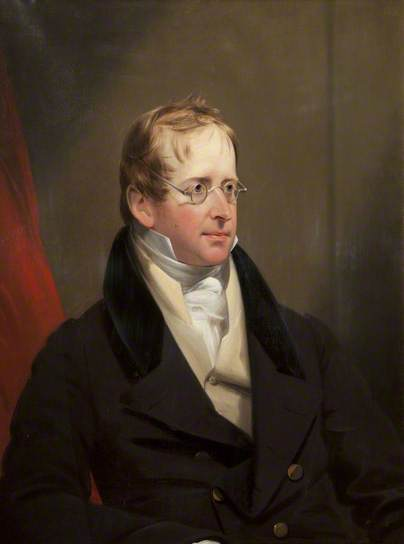
James Thomson, Unknown artist

=== The Study ===
Three small landscapes of riverside scenes and an armorial hatchment:

Boating at Brungerley by Benjamin Satterthwaite (1848–1923). Oil on canvas, 50 x 60 cm (approx). Gift from Captain R.C. Musson. Satterthwaite depicts three people in a boat at the bank of the River Ribble close to Brungerley Bridge. The three-span stone bridge is believed to have been built around 1814 after the previous stone bridge had been destroyed by floods. It is located between Waddington and Clitheroe. This painting is one of three works by Satterthwaite in the museum's collection, the other two feature Downham and Whalley Abbey.

Mytton Flatt and River by F.C. Cawthorne. Oil on canvas, 48 x 36 cm (approx). Gift from J. Moon. The painting depicts the River Ribble, possibly at Great Mitton, around three miles from Clitheroe, The church in the background appears to be All Hallows.

A Man Fishing on a River. Attributed to Edward Cawthorne (1849–1914). Oil on canvas, 39 x 60 cm (approx). The painting depicts a man fishing at a riverbank, probably on the River Ribble near Clitheroe. In the background at the right hand side there is a church tower, which appears similar to the church depicted in the previous painting.

An armorial hatchment which belonged to General Monk (1608–1670), a professional soldier who fought both for the Royalists and the Parliamentarians during the Civil Wars. A hatchment is a panel bearing a coat of arms, this would have been hung on the front of a building to inform visitors that a death had taken place.

=== Inhabiting the Landscape ===
A painting of a game bird by the Morecambe artist William Woodhouse:

Grouse Shot in Flight by William Woodhouse (1857–1939). Oil on canvas, 50 x 60 cm (approx). On loan from Lancaster City Museum. Woodhouse was born near Morecambe, his father was a fisherman. Around 1871 he began attending art classes at the Mechanics Institute in Lancaster and by 1881 he had begun exhibiting his work, mainly in the North West. Woodhouse had a good eye for detail and specialised in painting animals, especially horses and dogs. He was frequently commissioned to paint sporting scenes of game birds and gun dogs at grouse and pheasant shoots. The artist also exhibited three paintings at the Royal Academy in London, in 1889, 1896 and 1911.

=== Industrial Clitheroe ===
Two portraits by an unknown artist, depicting a former Mayor of Clitheroe and his wife:

James Thomson. Unknown artist. Oil on canvas, 60 x 50 cm (approx). Donated by Mrs. Thornton.

Cecilia Thomson. Unknown artist. Oil on canvas, 60 x 50 cm (approx). Donated by Mrs Thornton.

James Thomson (1779–1850) was born in Blackburn. An industrial chemist, he worked at Joseph Peel and Co., a London Calico printing firm, then managed their branch at Church, near Accrington. Thomson married Cecilia, the eldest daughter of the Rev Thomas Starkie, vicar of Blackburn, in 1806. They had four sons and two daughters.

In 1810, Thomson set up a successful calico printing business in Clitheroe, in partnership with a Blackburn cotton merchant, John Chippendale. During the 1840s, the firm registered around 500 fabric patterns per year. Thomson was elected a Fellow of the Royal Society in 1821. He was the Mayor of Clitheroe from 1836 to 1837 and became a justice of the peace in 1840. He died in 1850 while preparing his firm's display for the Great Exhibition of 1851.
