= Listed buildings in Great Mitton =

Great Mitton is a civil parish in Ribble Valley, Lancashire, England. It contains 17 listed buildings that are recorded in the National Heritage List for England. Of these, one is listed at Grade I, the highest of the three grades, one is at Grade II*, the middle grade, and the others are at Grade II, the lowest grade. The parish contains the village of Great Mitton and is otherwise completely rural. It is bounded by the Rivers Hodder and Ribble, and bridges crossing them are listed. The other listed buildings include houses, farmhouses, a barn, a church with associated strictures, public houses, a cross base, and a milestone.

== Key ==
Grade	Criteria
I	Buildings of exceptional interest, sometimes considered to be internationally important
II*	Particularly important buildings of more than special interest
II	Buildings of national importance and special interest

== Buildings ==
Name and location	Photograph	Date	Notes	Grade
All Hallows Church; 53.84613°N 2.43396°W		Late 13th century	The tower dates from the early 15th century, and the north chapel from the late 16th century. The church consists of a nave, a chancel, a north chapel, a south porch, and a west tower. The tower has three stages, diagonal buttresses, a west doorway with a pointed head, a west window, and an embattled parapet. Inside the church are memorials to members of the Shireburn family.	I
Churchyard cross 53.84605°N 2.43374°W		14th century	The cross is in the churchyard of All Hallows Church. The oldest part is the head, the rest dating from 1897. It is in sandstone on a square base that broaches to a tapering octagonal shaft. The head is circular, and each side is carved with a depiction of the Crucifixion. There is an inscription on the base.	II
Edisford Bridge; 53.86847°N 2.41767°W		Medieval	The bridge carries the B6243 road over the River Ribble. It is in stone and consists of four arches with cutwaters. The main arch is larger and segmental, and the others are pointed. The bridge is also a scheduled monument.	II
Cross base 53.85226°N 2.43888°W		Medieval (probable)	The cross base is in sandstone, and has a square plan and sloping sides. On the top is a rectangular socket. The cross base is set on a square block of sandstone.	II
Old Bridge; 53.84779°N 2.45129°W		1562	A disused bridge crossing the River Hodder, it is in sandstone, and consists of three segmental arches, the middle arch being the widest. It has triangular cutwaters, but no parapet. The bridge is also a scheduled monument.	II*
Thirty Acres Farmhouse; 53.86633°N 2.42861°W	—	1591	The house is in stone with a stone-slate roof, and has two storeys. The central part has one bay, with a one-bay cross wing to the right, and an outshut to the left. Some of the windows are mullioned, and others are modern. In the outshut is a porch that has a doorway with a chamfered surround, and a Tudor arched head with an inscription.	II
Great Mitton Hall; 53.84574°N 2.43424°W		c.1600	A stone house, partly pebbledashed, with a slate roof, in two storeys with an attic and cellar. The windows are mullioned or mullioned and transomed. At the right end is a single-storey extension projecting forward. On the south front is a gabled porch with a re-used outer doorway. At the northeast is a gabled turret, and near the centre of the north front is a gabled dormer. Other features include buttresses at the right gable end, and finials on the gables.	II
Barn, Mitton Old Hall Farm; 53.84572°N 2.43507°W	—	c.1600 (possible)	The barn is in sandstone with a slate roof. Its openings include a wide entrance, windows, and a pitching door. Inside the barn is an aisle with five trusses making six bays.	II
Sundial; 53.84605°N 2.43390°W		1683	The sundial is in the churchyard of All Hallows Church. It is in sandstone on a square base. The sundial has a square shaft, and is fluted in the lower part, and tapered above, with a moulded cap. On the top are a brass plate and a gnomon. The plate and the shaft have inscriptions.	II
Milestone; 53.86791°N 2.45468°W		1766	The milestone is in sandstone, it has a square plan and a shaped top. On it are inscribed the distances in miles to Preston, Gisburn, Lancaster, and Whalley.	II
Edisford Bridge Inn; 53.86878°N 2.42002°W		Mid to late 18th century	The public house is rendered with sandstone dressings and a slate roof. It has two storeys and three bays, the right bay having been added in the 19th century. The windows in the first two bays are mullioned, and those in the right bay and in the right gable wall are sashes. The windows and doorway have plain surrounds.	II
Edisford Hall Farmhouse and two cottages 53.86779°N 2.42073°W	—	Late 18th century	The building contains material from the 17th century and from the later medieval period. It is in pebbledashed stone with sandstone dressings, a stone-slate roof, and two storeys. The cottages have one bay each and sash windows in surrounds with ogee heads. The doorways are paired and have plain surrounds. Above them is a re-set stone carved with inscribed shields. The house has four bays and mullioned windows. There are two re-set carved stones on the front.	II
Higher Hodder Bridge; 53.86530°N 2.46174°W		Late 18th century (probable)	A road bridge crossing the River Hodder, it is in sandstone, and consists of two elliptical arches. The bridge has triangular cutwaters, and a solid parapet with coping.	II
Edisford Bridge Farmhouse and Cottage; 53.86870°N 2.42071°W		Early 19th century	The houses are in sandstone with a slate roof, and in two storeys. On the right of the south front is a modern porch. To its left are two bays containing sash windows with ogee heads, and between them is a former semicircular-headed doorway that has been converted into a window. In the right gable end the windows include a Venetian window.	II
Mitton Bridge; 53.84401°N 2.43347°W		Early 19th century (probable)	The bridge carries the B6246 road over the River Ribble. It is in sandstone, and consists of three segmental arches with rounded cutwaters. The bridge has a solid parapet, a string course, and weathered coping. There is an inscription on the southern parapet.	II
The Old Vicarage; 53.84719°N 2.43207°W	—	Early 19th century (probable)	A stone house with sandstone dressings, quoins, and a slate roof. The southwest front has three bays. There is a central single-storey porch that has corner pillars with pinnacles and an embattled parapet. The outer doorway has a Tudor arched head. The southeast front has two bays, a canted bay window with an embattled parapet, and a mullioned and transomed window. The other windows in the house are sashes.	II
Three Fishes Inn; 53.84663°N 2.43562°W		Early to mid 19th century	The public house is in pebbledashed stone with a modern tile roof, and has two storeys. The part to the left has three bays, sash windows, and a central doorway with a plain surround. Above the doorway are three re-set medieval stones. The part to the right has been converted from a barn, and contains a wide opening with a segmental head, now glazed, a sash window, a modern window, a doorway, and two circular pitching holes, also glazed.	II
