= River Blakewater, Lancashire =

River in Lancashire, England

Coordinates: 53.7383°N 2.5134°W

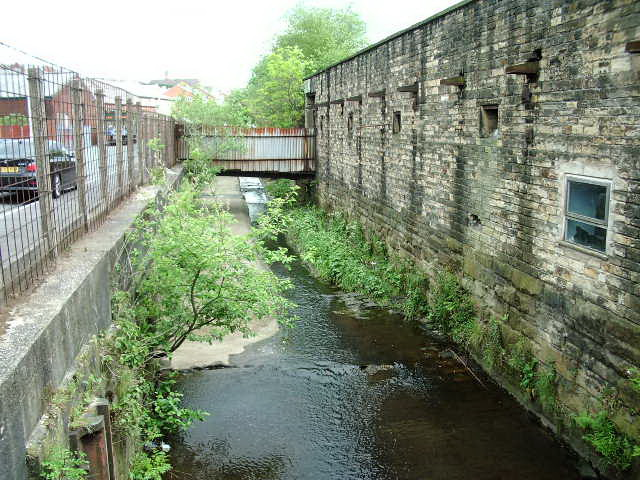
River Blakewater in Blackburn

The River Blakewater is a river running through Lancashire, originally giving the name to the town of Blackburn, which meant dark coloured stream. However, the river gradually became known as Blackwater.

The Blakewater rises on the moors above Guide near Blackburn as Knuzden Brook and runs through the hamlet of that name, before taking the name Blakewater (meaning either "black water" or "clear water," the latter deriving from Old English blæc) near the village of Whitebirk.

From there, the river runs through the Blackburn areas of Little Harwood, Cob Wall and Brookhouse to Blackburn town centre.

The section of the Blakewater running through Blackburn town centre was culverted during the Industrial Revolution, and now runs underground. The culvert was extensively modified in the 1960s during the redevelopment of the town centre - it now runs underneath Ainsworth Street and between Blackburn Cathedral and Blackburn Bus Station. In recent years, the town has undergone a phase of regeneration with future proposals to open up parts of the culverted river so that the Blakewater will once again flow openly through areas of the town centre.

On the western side of the town centre the Blakewater continues under Whalley Banks and through the Redlam area.

The Blakewater joins the River Darwen outside Witton Country Park in Blackburn, which continues on to join the River Ribble at Walton-le-Dale.

In addition to the aforementioned Knuzden Brook, the waters of the Blakewater are swelled by Little Harwood Brook (coming from Sunny Bower), Audley Brook (from the region of Queen's Park to the confluence near Darwen Street) and Snig Brook (which rises near Lammack and runs through Corporation Park).

== Tributaries ==
Snig Brook rises near Pleckgate and flows southwards, behind Lammack and close to Four Lane Ends, before feeding the lakes in Corporation Park. From there, Snig Brook flows down to the west of Montague Street through a culvert, meeting the Blakewater near Nab End.

The entirely culverted Audley Brook rises close to the former site of Audley Hall north of the Queen's Park area of Blackburn. From there, it flows westward, meeting the Blakewater near Darwen Street Bridge, where the railway between Blackburn and Preston crosses Darwen Street.

Little Harwood Brook joins the Blakewater at Bastwell (recorded in the 13th century as Baddestwysel the latter part deriving from an Old English term meaning place where two brooks meet), having risen close to Mickle Hey and running through Brownhill, as well as having been fed itself by Seven Acre Brook (running east from Rough Hey and joining by Blackburn Cemetery near Roe Lee, for much of its course marking the boundary between Blackburn with Darwen to the south and the Ribble Valley) and Royshaw Clough (running east from near Four Lane Ends).
