= River Darwen =

River in Lancashire, England

Coordinates: 53.7489°N 2.6849°W

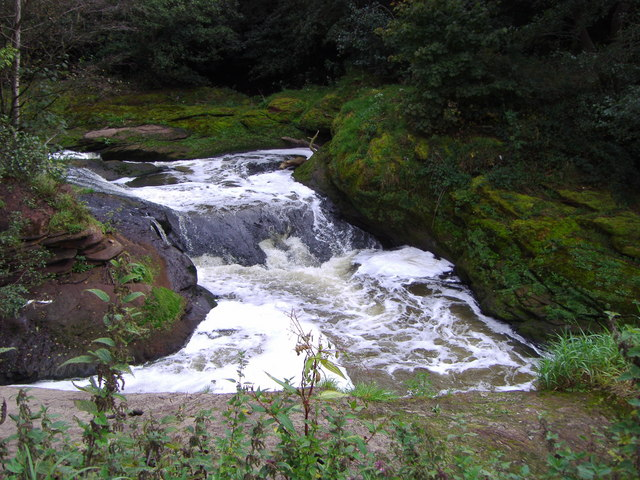
Waterfall on the River Darwen near Coup Green

The River Darwen runs through Darwen and Blackburn in Lancashire, England, eventually joining the River Ribble at Walton le Dale south of Preston on its way to the Ribble Estuary.

== Course ==
Originating at Jack's Key Clough where Grain Brook and Grainings Brook meet, the two streams from Bull Hill and Cranberry Moss respectively, the river flows through the town of Darwen, continuing into the suburbs of Blackburn past Ewood Park. The river passes below the Leeds and Liverpool Canal at Ewood Aqueduct and is culverted again at Waterfall and near Griffin Park. It is joined by the River Blakewater near Witton Country Park in Blackburn and leaves the mostly urban landscapes of the towns behind, flowing through parklands and valleys. A further tributary, the River Roddlesworth, joins the Darwen at the bottom of Moulden Brow on the boundary between Blackburn with Darwen and Chorley Borough Council (the name Moulden Brow being associated with Moulden Water, an alternative name for this stretch of the river). From there, the Darwen flows past Hoghton Tower through Hoghton Bottoms and Samlesbury Bottoms, finally combining with the River Ribble at Walton-le-Dale.

== Places of interest ==
- A small Memorial Garden for Kathleen Ferrier is on the river bank at Higher Walton, Lancashire.
- Parkway and Higher Croft Woods, south of Blackburn, is a Biological Heritage Site (BHS) which also received a Local Nature Reserve status in 2005
- Walton-le-Dale, location of the Battle of Preston during the Second English Civil War, captured a Parliamentarian army victory in a poem "To Cromwell" by John Milton: -

" While Darwent Streams with Blood of Scots imbru'd..."

The poem names the river "Darwent," giving us evidence of its derivation from a Brythonic dialect form similar to the Old Welsh derwenyd (Modern Welsh derwenydd), meaning "valley thick with oaks".

== History ==
The river was polluted with human and industrial effluent during the Industrial Revolution, and this contamination continued until the early 1970s. The river often changed colour dramatically as a result of paper and paint mills routinely using the river water to flush out dye and paint tanks. This process has now ceased, and as a result the river water is now relatively clear which has resulted in the return of trout and small fish. In 2012 a section of the river which had remained in a culvert for 100 years was uncovered at an area of Darwen known as Shorey Bank. Throughout the course of the river many improvements have resulted in improved water quality.

== Tributaries ==
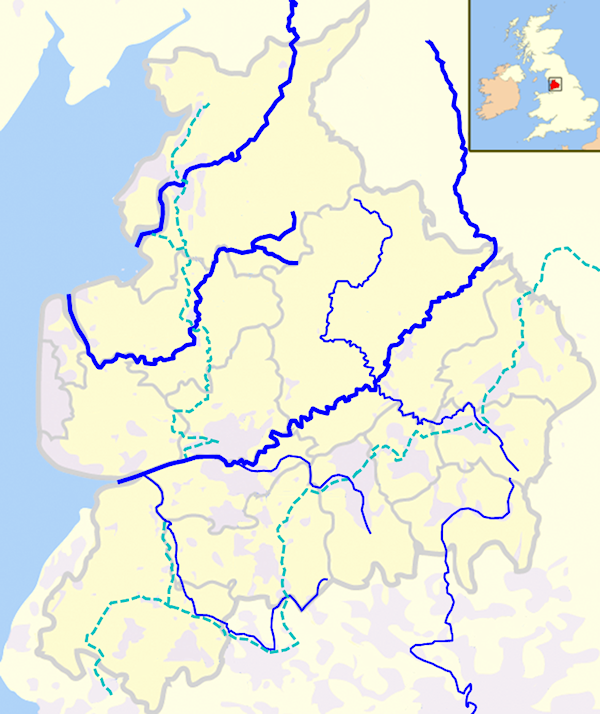
Shown with other rivers and canals in Lancashire
- Hennel Brook
  - Cockshott Brook
- Many Brooks
  - Black Brook
    - Hatchwood Brook
  - Fowler Brook
    - Drum Head Brook
      - Gorton Brook
      - Mill Brook
    - Bank Head Brook
- Old Darwen
- Beeston Brook
  - Quaker Brook
- Hole Brook
  - Huntley Brook (North)
  - Huntley Brook (South)
- Alum House Brook
  - Arley Brook
- Trout Brook
- River Roddlesworth
  - Finnington Brook
  - Stockclough Brook
    - Whitehalgh Brook
      - Shaw Brook
      - Chapels Brook
      - Sheep Bridge Brook
  - Rake Brook
  - Calf Hey Brook
  - Ferny Bed Springs
- River Blakewater
  - Snig Brook
  - Audley Brook
  - Little Harwood Brook
    - Royshaw Clough
    - Seven Acre Brook
  - Knuzden Brook
- Scotshaw Brook
  - Moss Brook
  - Badger Brook
- Higher Croft Brook
  - Newfield Brook
- Davy Field Brook
  - Flash Brook
  - Grimshaw Brook
    - Waterside Brook
      - Mean Brook
        - Sapling Clough
      - Hoddlesden Moss Brook
        - Far Scotland Brook
      - Pickup Bank Brook
        - Moss Brook
        - Twitchells Brook
- Sunnyhurst Brook
  - Stepback Brook
- Bold Venture Brook
  - High Lumb Brook
    - Livesey Brook
- Kebbs Brook
  - Green Lowe Brook
- Bury Fold Brook
  - Old Briggs Brook
    - Duckshaw Brook
- Grainings Brook
- Grain Brook
  - Bent Hall Brook
  - Deadman's Clough

Next confluence upstream	River Ribble	Next confluence downstream
Stydd Brook (North)	River Darwen	Savick Brook (North)
