= Low Moor =

Low Moor may refer to:

- Low Moor, Bradford, England
  - Low Moor railway station
  - Low Moor Ironworks
  - Low Moor Explosion
- Low Moor, Lancashire, England
  - Low Moor F.C., football club from Clitheroe, England
- Low Moor, Iowa, USA
- Low Moor, New Jersey, USA
- Low Moor, Virginia, USA
