= Freckleton Pool =

River in Lancashire, England

Coordinates: 53.748°N 2.857°W

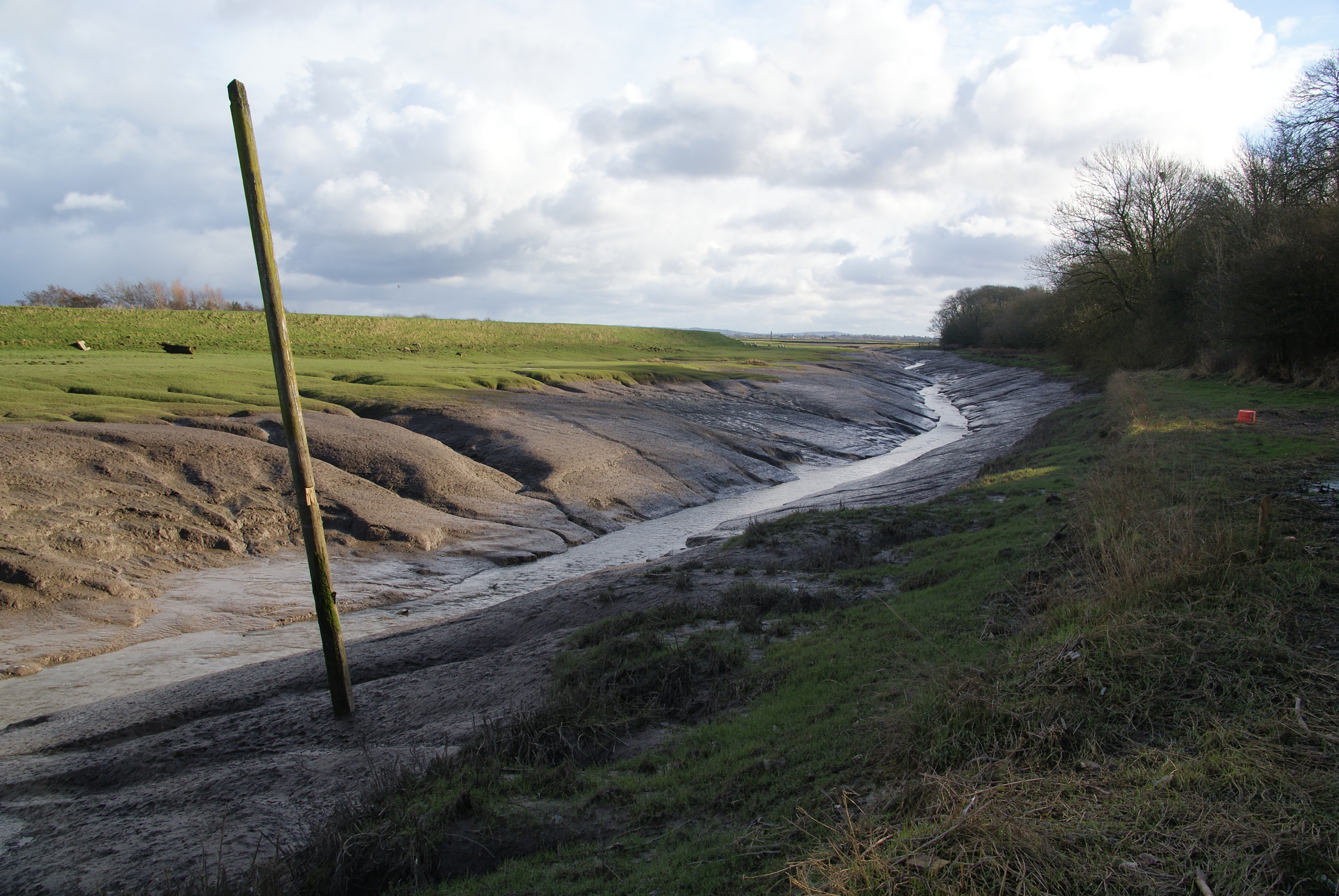
Freckleton Pool at low tide

Freckleton Pool or Dow Brook is a tributary of the River Ribble running through the Fylde plain in Lancashire, England, flowing for 7.8 kilometres (4.8 mi) past the towns of Kirkham and Freckleton west of Preston.

Next confluence upstream	River Ribble	Next confluence downstream
Savick Brook (North)	Freckleton Pool	River Douglas (South)
