= National nature reserves in Lancashire =

Coordinates: 53.969°N 2.628°W

National nature reserves in Lancashire in England are established by Natural England.

There are two national nature reserves in Lancashire, both of which are managed by Natural England, as opposed to some counties where some nature reserves are managed by non-governmental organisations such as the Royal Society for the Protection of Birds or the National Trust.

== List of reserves ==
- Gait Barrows NNR: limestone habitat
- Ribble Estuary NNR: wintering wildfowl

== National nature reserves in other areas of England ==
- National nature reserves in England
- Natural England
