= Mitton Hoard =

Coin hoard in Britain

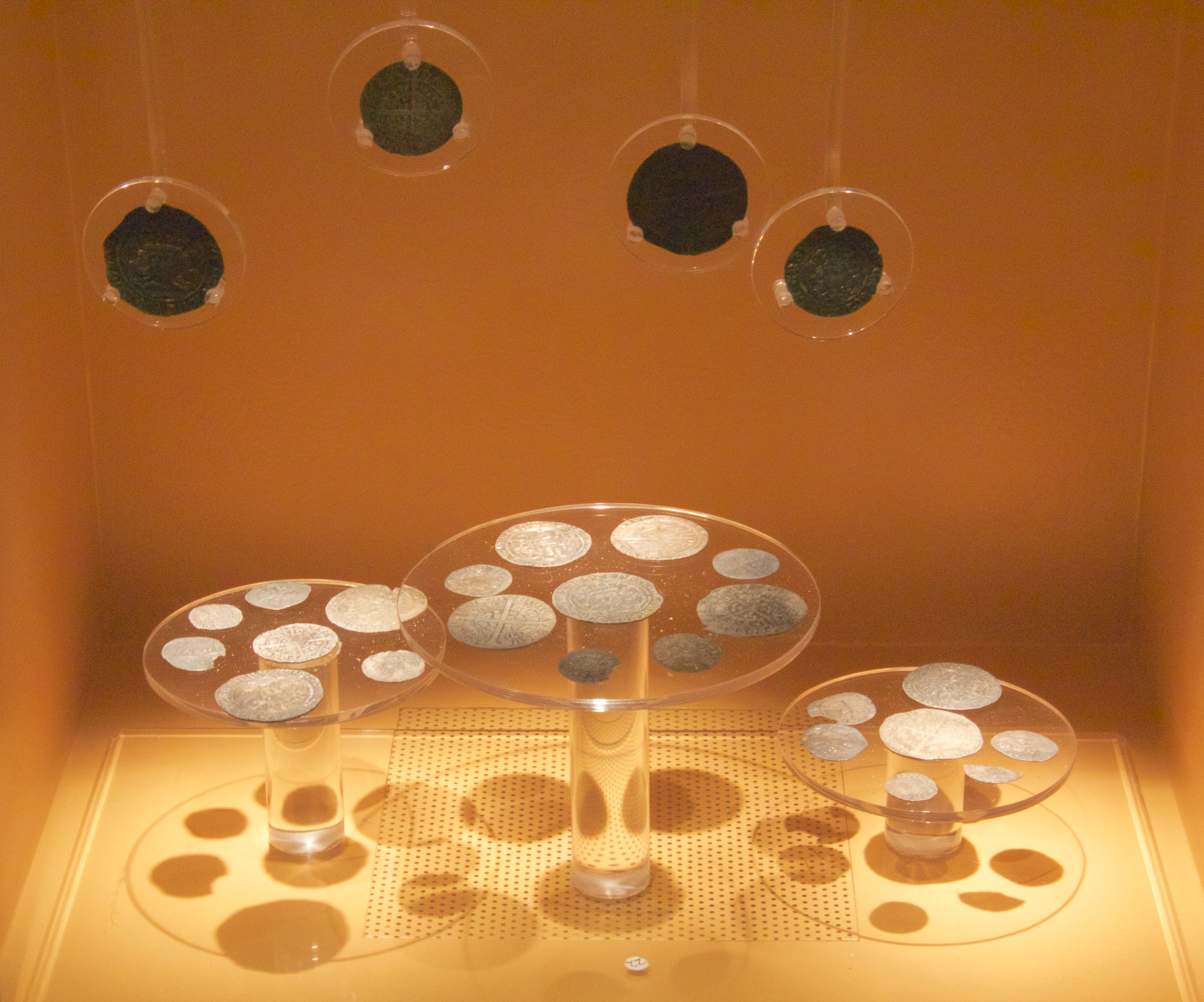
- The Mitton Hoard on display at Clitheroe Castle
- Material: silver
- Created: Late 1420s
- Discovered: 2006 or 7 September 2009; Mitton, Clitheroe; 53°50′47″N 2°26′32″W
- Present location: Clitheroe Castle Museum

The Mitton Hoard is a hoard of silver coins found near Clitheroe in Lancashire, England, in 2006 or 2009. The hoard is now in Clitheroe Castle Museum. The documented treasure consisted of 11 silver coins or parts of coins.

== Local history ==
Mitton is divided into two villages, Great Mitton and Little Mitton. This find was first detected to the west of Great Mitton between the River Hodder and the River Ribble. The find was near a bend in the River Hodder. One source says that these coins were found in 2006 whilst another says that the coins were found using a metal detector on Monday 7 September 2009. The treasure was declared to be treasure and it was obtained by the museum services. The hoard is now on display in the Clitheroe Castle Museum.

== The hoard ==
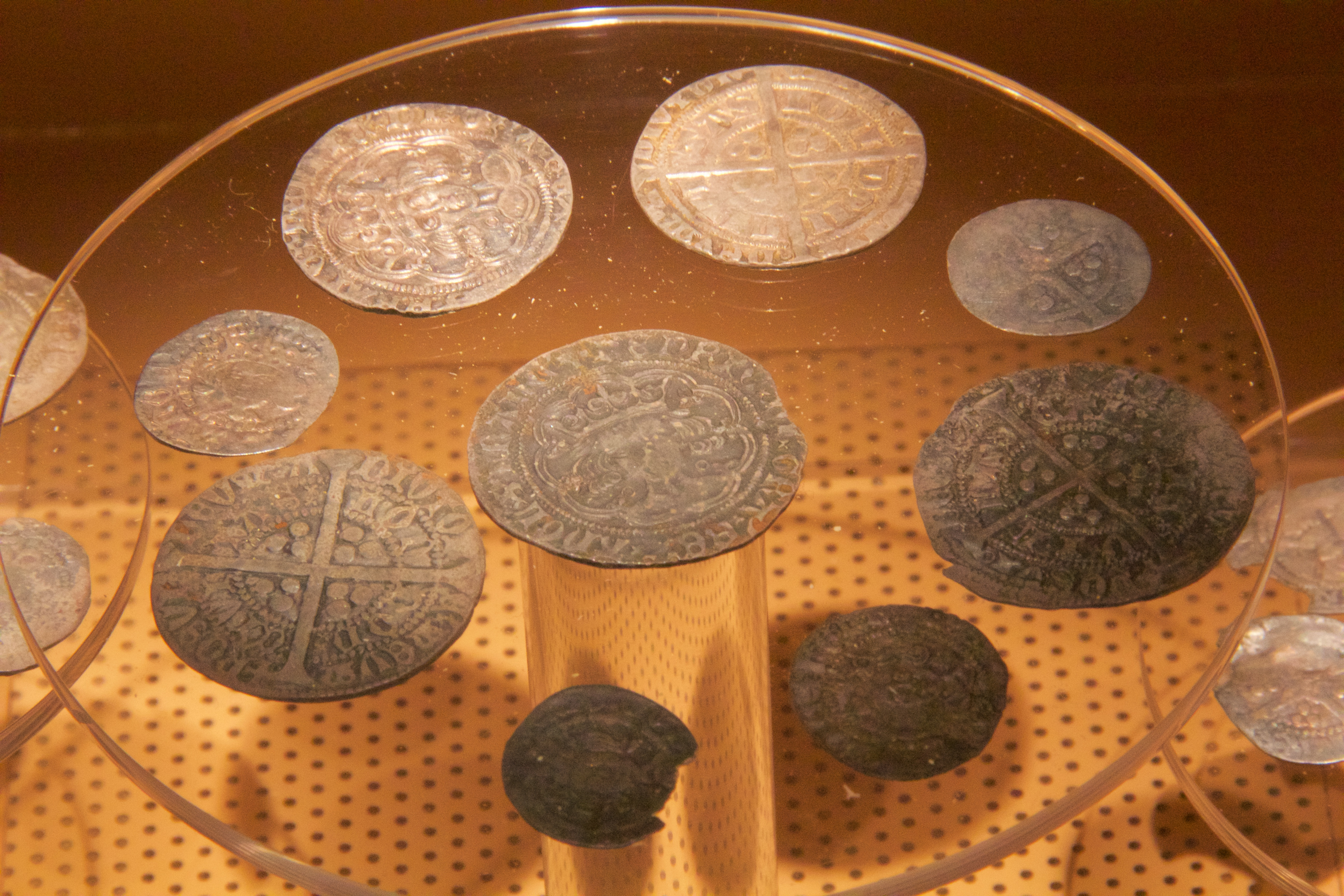
A selection of coins from the Mitton Hoard on display at Clitheroe Castle Museum

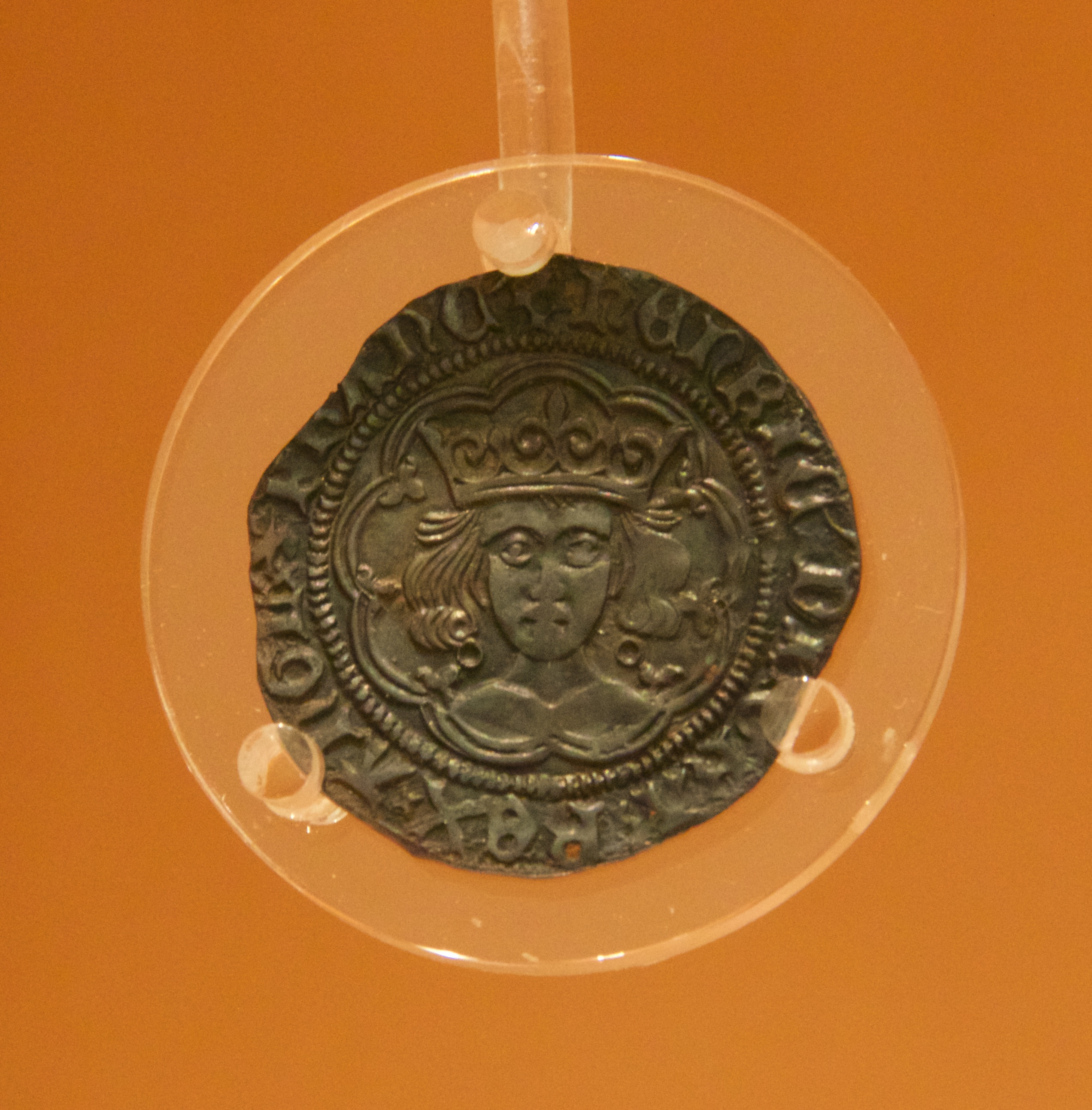
A close-up of one of the coins from the Hoard

The hoard can be dated from the date of the last coin that was included in the hoard and this came from the 1420s. Three of the coins were the oldest and they dated to the reign of Edward I or Edward II. The English silver is 97.5% pure whilst the French fragments are 80% pure silver. With the exception of the farthing these coins represent all the small value coins. It is thought that these coins could all be in circulation at the same time. The hoard was probably either accidentally lost, or deliberately hidden, in the late 1420s.

== Artefacts ==
The documented treasure consisted of 11 silver coins or coin fragments. The coins were:

- Three pennies from Edward I or Edward II of England
- Two half-groats from Edward III of England
- A halfpenny from Richard II of England
- Three groats from Henry VI of England
- There are also two small fragments made for Gaucher V de Châtillon between 1313 and 1322. Gaucher V de Châtillon held one of five highest officers of state as he was the Constable of France from 1302 to 1329.

Note: Eleven of the coins are documented however there are twenty-seven on display at the Clitheroe Castle Museum.

== See also ==
- List of hoards in Britain
- History of the English penny (1154–1485)
