= Ribble Rivers Trust =

Ribble Rivers Trust project banner, Hoghton, 2018

Ribble Rivers Trust is an environmental charity based in Lancashire, England. It works to protect and restore the ecology of the River Ribble, its tributaries and the wider Ribble catchment. Established in 1998, its work includes river restoration, habitat improvement and improving fish passage. Its Ribble Life Together programme won the catchment-scale category of the 2022 UK River Prize.
