= North West Sound Archive =

The North West Sound Archive, founded in Manchester in 1979, was the largest archive of sound recordings in the UK outside of London, with over 140,000 items. It was relocated to Clitheroe in 1982, where it occupied the third floor of the Clitheroe Castle Museum. 53.8702°N 2.3931°W It was closed in 2015 for financial reasons, and its materials relocated to the Manchester Central Library, Liverpool Central Library, and the Lancashire Archives, according to the location to which the material related.
