= Savick Brook =

River in Lancashire, England

Savick Brook is a watercourse in Lancashire, England, which runs from the outskirts of Longridge westward north of Preston to the River Ribble.

== Overview ==
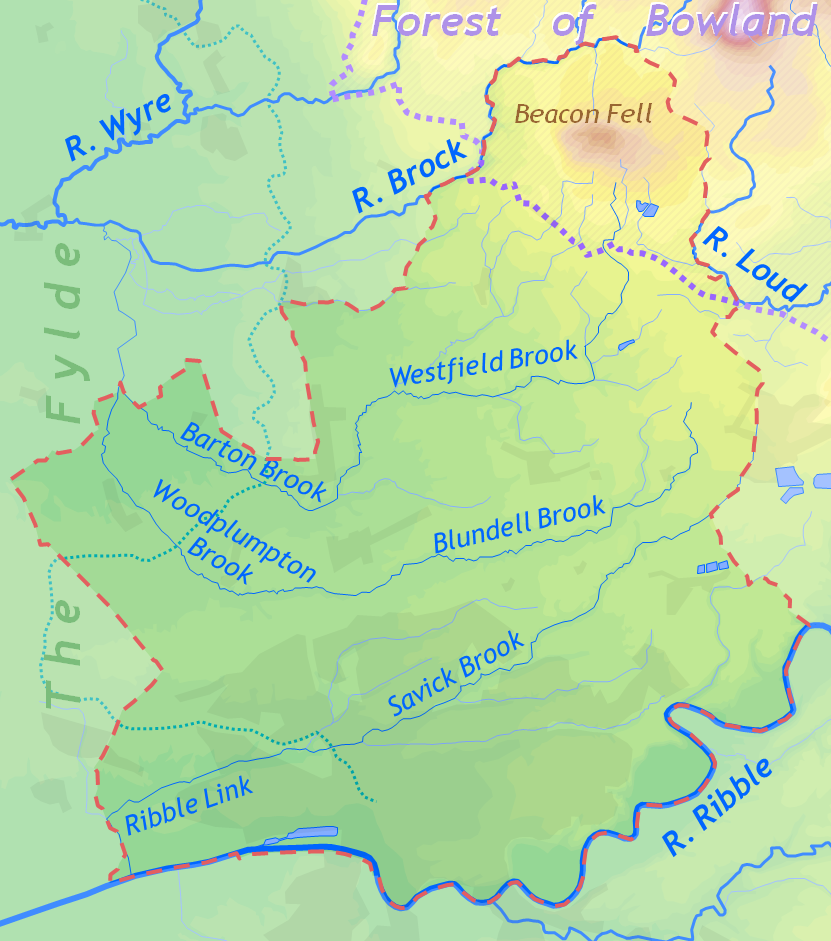
Topography of the City of Preston showing the course of Savick Brook

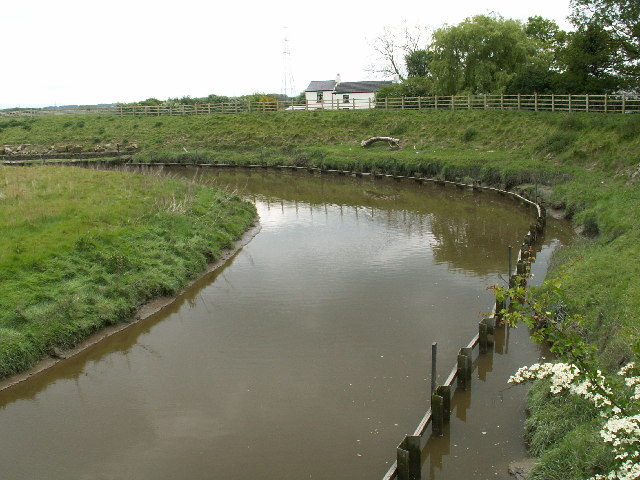
The Ribble Link along the course of Savick Brook

The brook is a tributary of the lower Ribble, with its source on the outskirts of Longridge (around 53.826934°N 2.610376°W), approximately 8 mi (13 km) to the northeast of Preston. It flows westward though the suburb of Fulwood towards and to the south of the village of Lea, where it makes a sharp turn to the south. It then continues on a southerly course and enters the Ribble from the north bank (at 53.7531°N 2.7880°W) approximately 1.5 mi (2.4 km) west of the tidal basin that marks the entrance to Preston Dock.

== Geology ==
Most of the underlying geology for the brook's water basin is Triassic rock consisting of red Sherwood sandstone, with a faulted boundary with the carboniferous rocks to the east of Preston. The upper part of Savick Brook around Longridge lies in a carboniferous area of Millstone Grit. Glacial drift deposits, principally till (boulder clay) also cover much of the area.

== Tributaries ==
A number of smaller waterways flow into the brook, including:

- Deepdale Brook
- Eaves Brook
- Sandy Brook
- Sharoe Brook

== Ribble Link ==
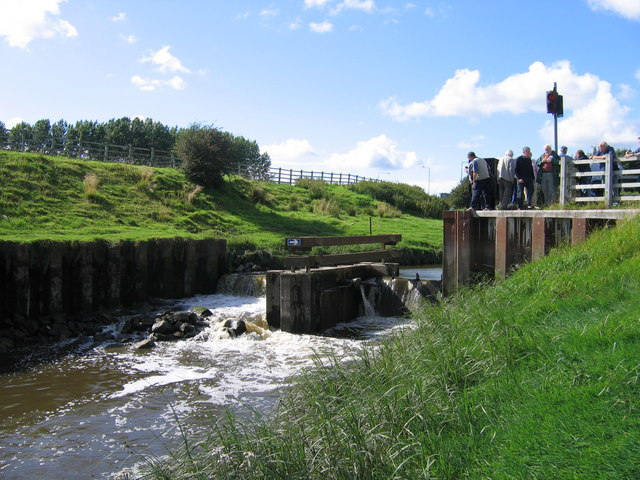
Savick Brook navigation weir; Ribble Link, near Lea

In December 2000 construction began to turn a 4 mi (6.4 km) section of the brook west of Cottom Mill bridge into a navigation canal as part of the Ribble Link, a scheme to connect the previously isolated Lancaster Canal to the River Ribble. Opened in July 2002, the Link has a series of nine locks to allow small craft and narrowboats up to 61.8 ft (18.8 m) in length and 7.5 ft (2.3 m) in width to transit between the two waterways.

== Water Level and Quality ==
There are a number of monitoring stations along the brook which measures its water level and at which samples are taken to determine water quality:

=== Level ===
At the Savick Brook Monitoring Station near Highgate Wood, the brook has had an average depth of between 0.77 m (2.5 ft) and 1.26 m (4.1 ft) for 90% of the time since monitoring began. In the twelve months to 19 October 2020, the water level has been between 0.76 m (2.5 ft) and 1.37 m (4.5 ft) for at least 151 days.

=== Quality ===
A survey by the Environmental Agency in May 2001 determined that the waters of the brook were of a poor quality (River Ecosystem Classification 3 and 4 and General Quality Assessment (GQA) grades D and E)(section 4.2), particularly from sewer discharges and overflows. As a result, United Utilities were committed to carrying out a series of improvements to the Preston Sewerage System over the subsequent years to improve water quality through fewer discharges from combined sewer overflows.

A study by the Department for Environment, Food & Rural Affairs (defra) in August 2012 found that the water quality of the brook was:

- upper waters - moderate to bad for biological quality, and for chemical quality, good for ammonia and poor for phosphate
- lower waters - moderate to bad for biological quality, and for chemical quality, mostly good but occasionally poor for ammonia and moderate to poor for phosphate

The study also found a noticeable decrease in water quality in wet periods, further deteriorating in the brook's downstream waters. Furthermore, in the May 2001 to September 2011, there was a significant decline in the numbers of rheophillic fish (i.e. barbel, chub and dace). It was defra's belief that the primary contributing factors were agricultural outflows (mostly dairy farming) and sewerage discharges, with a noted rise in consensual sewerage discharges.

=== Pollution Incidents ===
As the brook runs through farmlands and industrial estates there have been historic problems of industrial waste, phosphate and bacteria such as E-Coli and Enterococcus entering the waterway.

In early May 2013 a large quantity of waste oil was dumped into the brook and another nearby waterway. On 1 November 2019 it was reported to the Environmental Agency that the brook had been contaminated with what appeared to be a large quantity of cow effluent, polluting 3 km (1.9 mi) of the brook and resulting in a noxious smell being reported in Fulwood. Such incidents have been noted as having an adverse effect upon the fish stocks in the brook.

== Fishing ==
Sections of the brook, especially around the confluence with the Ribble, are popular with recreational anglers. A survey by the Environmental Agency in May 2001 determined that the waters of the brook are of a suitable quality for self-sustaining populations of coarse fish, with eleven (11) different species identified:

- barbel
- chub
- dace
- eel
- flounder (juvenile)
- gudgeon
- minnow
- perch
- roach
- stickleback
- stoneloach

The survey noted that the brook has a surprisingly high number of fish populations despite the pollution risks from the adjoining farmlands and urban areas, and seems particularly well suited to sustaining chub. Furthermore, it stated that flounder, which is a marine species, utilises the brook extensively as a nursery area.

Next confluence upstream	River Ribble	Next confluence downstream
River Darwen (South)	Savick Brook	Freckleton Pool (North)
