= Maria Howard, Duchess of Norfolk =

English Catholic noblewoman

Stonyhurst as Maria knew it. Print after a watercolour by JMW Turner

Maria (Mary) Winifreda Francisca Howard, Duchess of Norfolk (née Shireburn or Sherburne; c. 1693 – 1754) was an English Catholic noblewoman, the last of the wealthy Shireburn family. She married twice, firstly to Thomas Howard, 8th Duke of Norfolk, from whom she became estranged before his death, and secondly to Peregrine Widdrington. She built a house in London on Arlington Street, which today is the clubhouse of the Royal Over-Seas League.

== Early life ==
The only surviving child and heir of Sir Nicholas Shireburn, 1st and last Baronet of Stonyhurst and Catherine Charleton, Maria Shireburn was born into a prominent Catholic family in 1692 or 1693. Born in London, she grew up mainly at Stonyhurst Hall (now Stonyhurst College) in Lancashire. She was christened as Maria Windforda Francesca and always called Mary. Her elder sister Isabel had died in 1688, and her brother Richard Francis died in 1702, supposedly as a result of eating poisonous berries in the garden. Her health was also bad and in 1698, she was taken to the Jacobite court at Château de Saint-Germain-en-Laye in France, where she was treated by William Waldegrave, James II's doctor.

She became the Duchess of Norfolk when she married Thomas Howard, 8th Duke of Norfolk, on 26 May 1709. She was sixteen years old, and brought a large dowry of more than £30,000. Although Catholics were not allowed to get married in public, the celebratory dinner at Shireburne House in St James's Square was a lavish affair.

== Marriages ==
The couple lived at various residences, including Arundel Castle in West Sussex, Worksop Manor in Nottinghamshire, and the house on St James Square in London. When her husband was arrested on 29 October 1722 under suspicion of involvement in a Jacobite plot and imprisoned in the Tower of London, the Duchess was not allowed to visit him. She nevertheless managed to convince her relative Charles Howard, 3rd Earl of Carlisle, to act as surety for his bail in May 1723. The childless marriage was reputedly unhappy due to the Duchess's strong Catholic and Jacobite feelings, which her husband may have wanted to suppress for political reasons.

By 1730, Howard was living apart from her husband. She had left him when he, as she put it, "truckled to the Usurper" (i.e. King George I). Another factor was that following the death of her mother in 1728, Howard had inherited the income from the Stonyhurst estate, but by 1730 her husband had taken possession of it. He sold off furnishings and moved some items to Worksop Manor, leaving Howard with jewellery and plate.

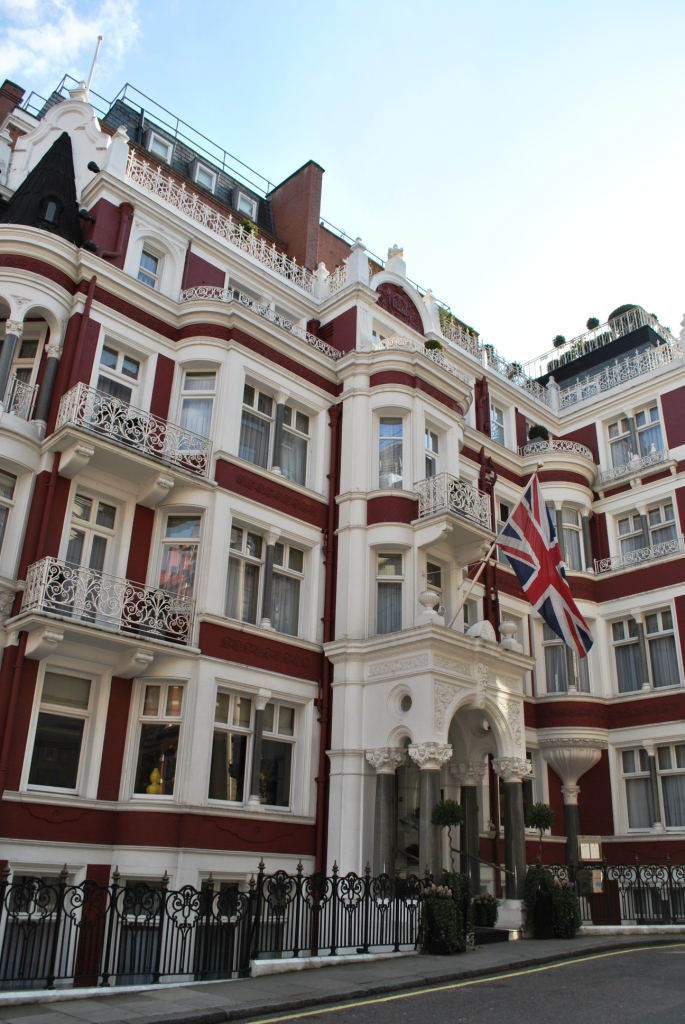
The house on Arlington Street, London, built by Howard in the 1730s, now with rebuilt facade

Widowed on 23 December 1732, the Duchess married Peregrine Widdrington in November 1733. He was the brother of William Widdrington, the 4th and last Baron Widdrington of Blankney, and had taken part in the Jacobite Rising of 1715. The marriage was announced in The Gentleman's Magazine but not recorded in a parish register, suggesting they were married by a Catholic priest. The refusal to legitimate the marriage caused Howard to split from some Jesuit acquaintances, and might have been a means to protect her financial independence after the problems of her first marriage.

Howard decided to build a new house at Arlington Street in London, purchasing land in 1734. She employed James Gibbs as architect, and commissioned a marble fireplace from John Michael Rysbrack. Whilst the construction was underway, she lived on Pall Mall. The work was completed in 1740, with skilled craftsmen working on the interior. The house was partially demolished in the 1930s and now serves as the clubhouse for the Royal Over-Seas League. Widdrington died in 1748. By this point, Howard was an absentee landlord, managing her northern estates from London. The last recorded time she was in Stonyhurst was 1734. She continued to support Jacobite initiatives, but was not linked to the rising of 1745.

== Death and legacy ==
She is variously recorded as dying in Preston or Tunbridge Wells or London on 17 or 25 September 1754. Her body is buried in the Shireburn Chapel at All Hallows Church, Gt Mitton, Lancashire. She died the last Shireburn, though the line continued through her heir and first cousin-once-removed Edward Weld, father of Thomas Weld (of Lulworth). She left property in Lancashire, London, Middlesex, Northumberland and Yorkshire, as well as estates in Blackburn, Ormskirk and the Isle of Man.

The 34 piece silver-gilt toilet service made in 1708, and presented by her father to the Duchess of Norfolk on her marriage, was granted an export licence to Australia in 2012, despite objections by the Victoria and Albert Museum. It was valued at £1,380,000.

Stonyhurst College have a good half-length portrait, given by the Weld family.
