= Ewood Aqueduct =

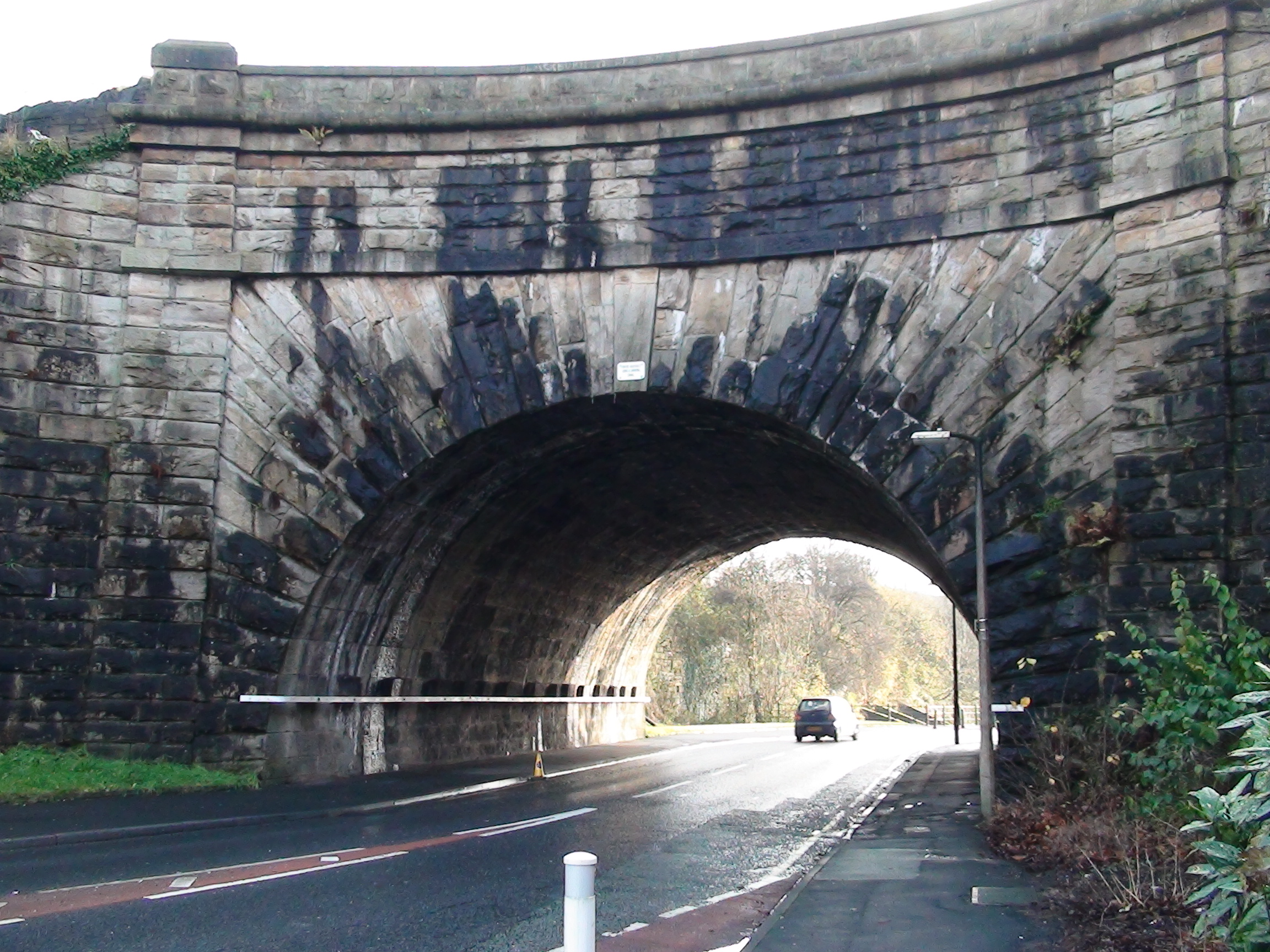
- Ewood Aqueduct, Blackburn Lancashire
- Coordinates: 53.7335°N 2.4926°W
- OS grid reference: SD675264
- Carries: Leeds and Liverpool Canal
- Crosses: River Darwen & B6447
- Locale: Blackburn
- Maintained by: Canal & River Trust

Characteristics
- Total length: 68 feet (20.7 m)
- Width: 43 feet (13.1 m)
- Traversable?: Yes
- Towpaths: NW Side
- No. of spans: One

History
- Construction end: 19th century

Listed Building – Grade II
- Official name: Leeds and Liverpool Canal Ewood Aqueduct
- Designated: 18 February 1992
- Reference no.: 1267539

Ewood Aqueduct is a high embankment carrying the Leeds and Liverpool Canal over the River Darwen and the B6447 road near Blackburn, Lancashire, England. Built of sandstone in the early 19th century, it is a Grade II listed building.

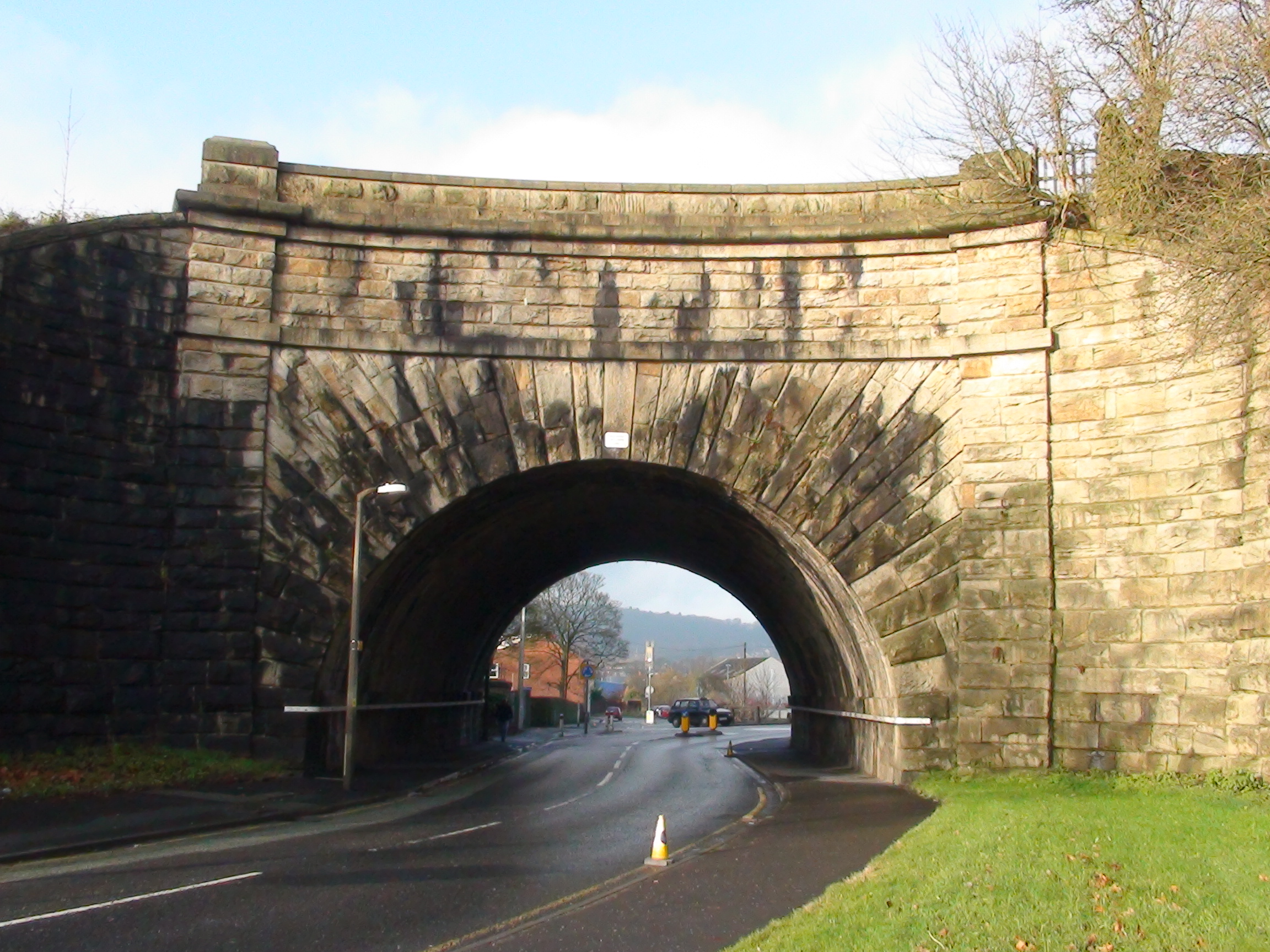
From the opposite side

== History ==
In 1789 Robert Whitworth varied the route of the unfinished part of the Leeds and Liverpool Canal, by building a new tunnel at Foulridge which lowered the summit level by 40 feet. He chose a more southerly route in Lancashire. This resulted in an Act of Parliament in 1790 which allowed further fund-raising for the completion. In 1794 another Act was granted authorising another change of route and yet more fund-raising. The new Foulridge Tunnel was proving difficult and expensive to dig, when it opened in 1796 it was 1,640 yards (1,500 m) long. This new route took the canal south via Burnley and Blackburn which was reached in 1810. This new route for this section of the canal meant it was now running parallel with and then crossing the isolated southern end of the Lancaster Canal. Common sense prevailed and the Leeds and Liverpool Canal connected with the Lancaster Canal between Wigan and Johnson's Hillock. The main line of the canal was thus completed in 1816.

== See also ==
- Burnley Embankment
