= Low Moor, Lancashire =

Hamlet in Lancashire, England

Coordinates: 53.87°N 2.41°W

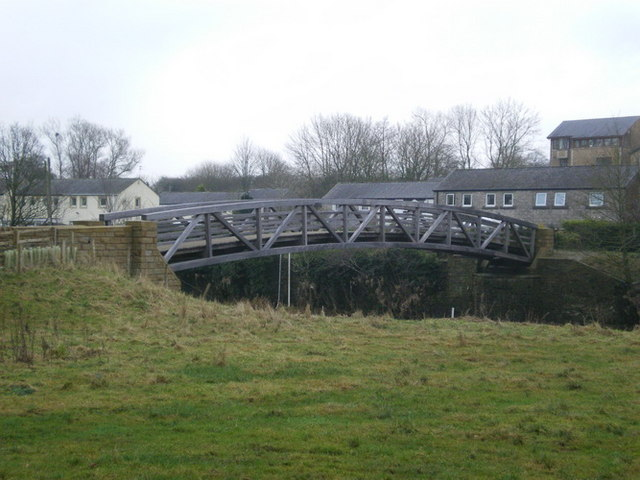
Footbridge over the River Ribble, at Low Moor

Low Moor is a hamlet which is part of the town of Clitheroe, located in Lancashire, England. It is situated two miles southwest of Clitheroe proper. It is significant for being a well documented mill village.

== History ==
In the nineteenth century, the hamlet was home to Low Moor Mill, "a most extensive cotton manufacture, with power looms, put in motion by an immense body of machinery". Employment and census data from the community has provided an important case study in the social history of the nineteenth century cotton industry.

This cotton mill, taken over by Jeremiah Garnett and Timothy Horsfall in 1799, closed in 1930 and was demolished. The workers' cottages survived. Two diaries of historical interest survive, one written by the weaver John O'Neill, and one by a co owner of the factory, James Garnett.

== Low Moor Mill ==
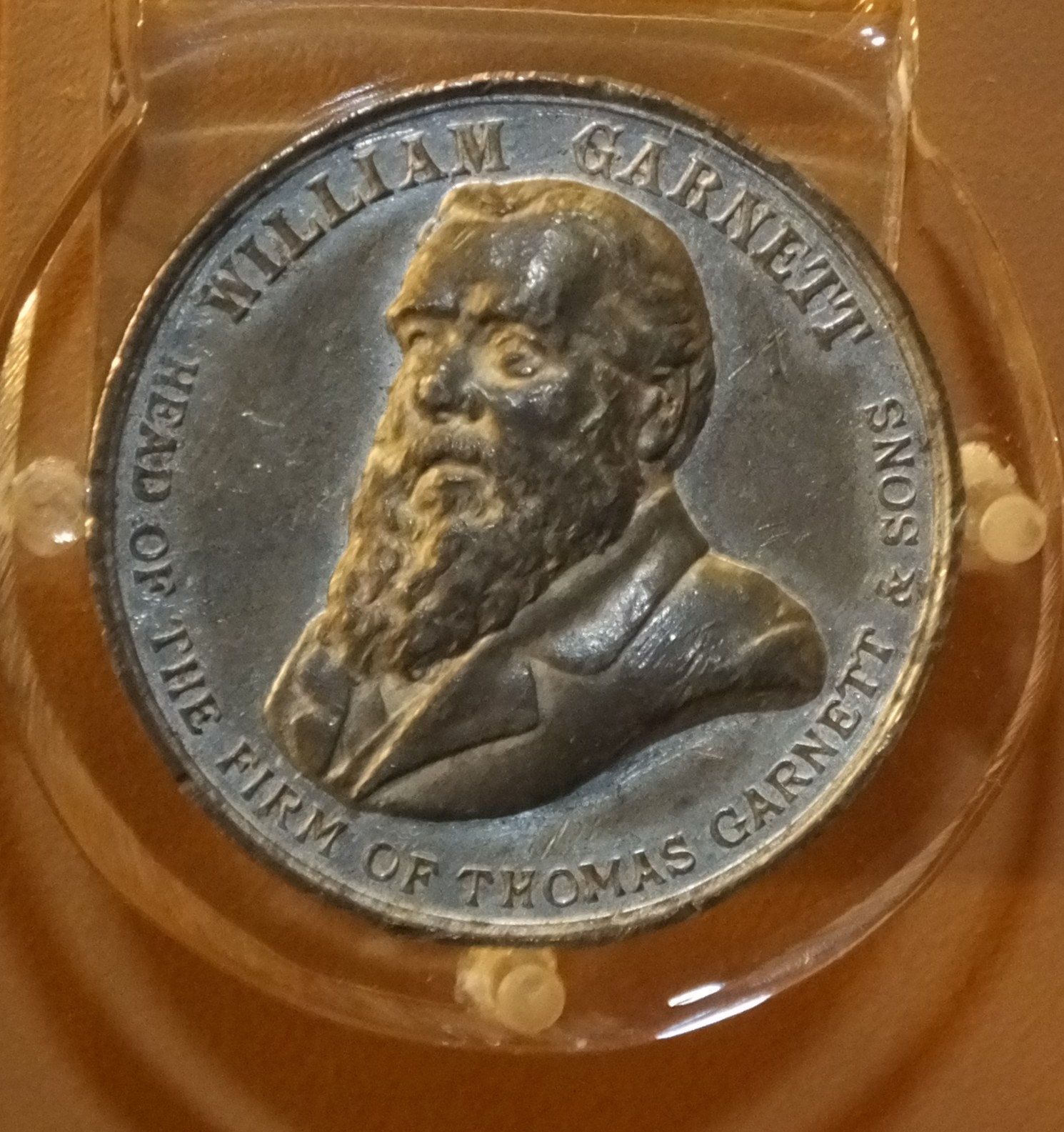
William Garnett, of Thomas Garnett and sons

The first mill, a five storey spinning mill, opened in 1782. The owners built cottages for the workers in the spirit of the mill towns of the following century. The mill and 28 workers cottage were sold to Parker and Parker in 1791, and then in 1799, to Jeremiah Garnett and Timothy Horsfall. The mill was demolished, replaced and extended.

The 1824 mill was powered by three iron waterwheels running on 0.75 miles (1.21 km) mill race from a weir built on the River Ribble.

Three beam engines were added by 1858. Weaving sheds were built in the 1850s and 1860s. The 1840 mill was powered by 3 iron waterwheels on a leet from the River Ribble, supplemented by beam engines. The waterwheels were replaced in the late nineteenth century by turbines, and the beam engines were upgraded to a 1250 IHP vertical steam engine in 1893/4. Garnett's mill closed in 1930.

The buildings have been demolished and replaced by housing.

=== Housing ===
Parker and Garnett developed the housing. There were 262 houses with 1057 inhabitants in the 1861 census. Some of these were back to back in design, and at a later stage these were 'knocked through' to provide 'through houses' with a yard and privy, to comply with the standards laid down in the 1875 Public Health Act. Thus, in 1928 when the mill closed, there were 200 houses, nine shops, a National school, church and two Methodist chapels.

== Social amenities ==
Low Moor has a local club called the Low Moor Reading Room and Club with two snooker tables, one pool table, one dartboard, and a few slot machines. Some of the residents of Clitheroe and Low Moor come here to socialize. Professional UFC Fighter Michael Bisping grew up in this part of town. There is also a nursery situated in the area named St Paul's Nursery as well as St Paul's Church.

Low Moor Croquet Club is also a place of interest which is run by Low Moor Residents Luke Chatburn and Adam Warriner. A Spar Store has been built within the area for local residents.

== Places of interest ==
- River Ribble and two bridges (Edisford Bridge)
- Low Moor Reading Room and Club
- Low Moor Croquet Club
- Low Moor Croquet Lawn
