= Shireburn baronets =

Extinct baronetcy in the Baronetage of England

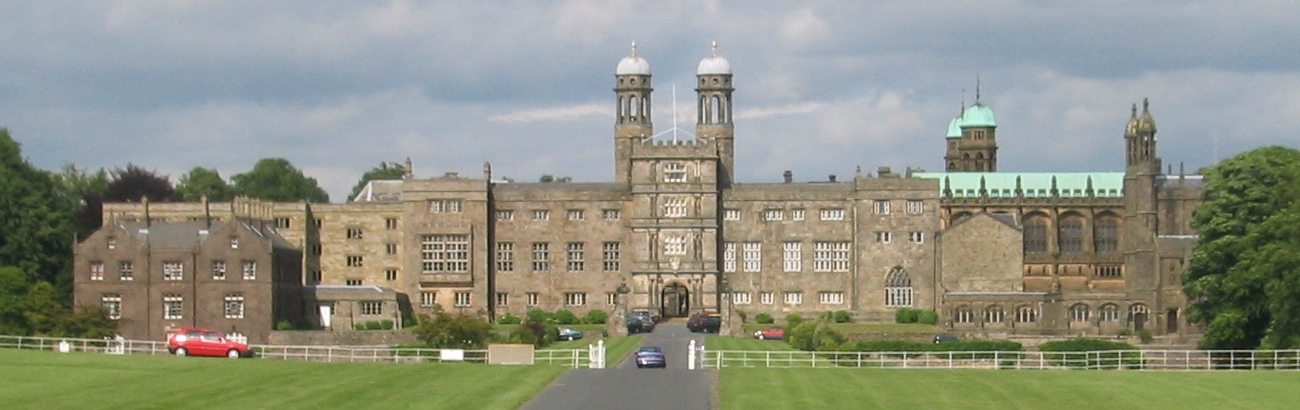
Stonyhurst College, the former seat of the Shireburn family

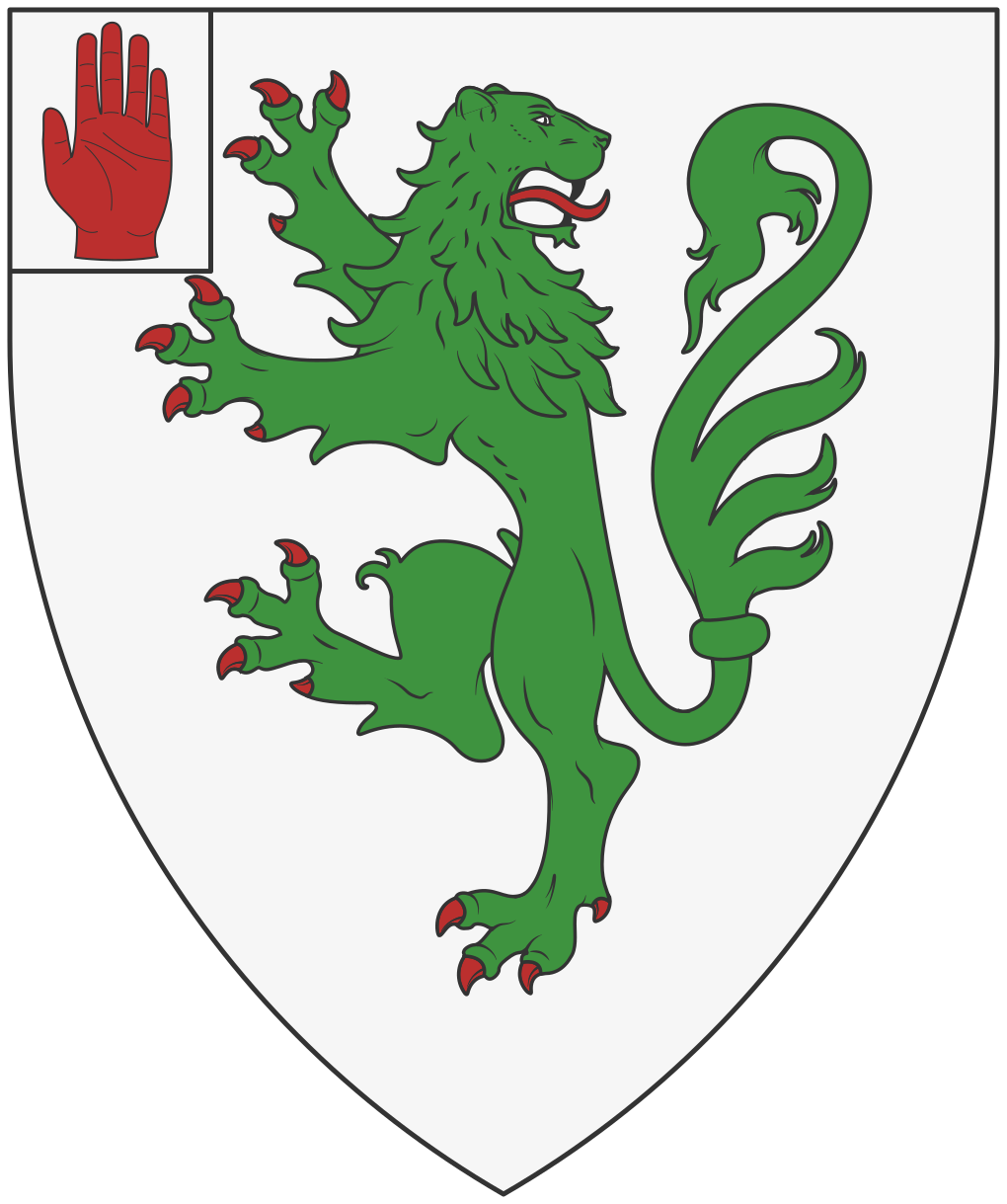
The coat of arms of the Shireburns of Stonyhurst

The Shireburn or Sherburne Baronetcy, of Stonyhurst in the County of Lancaster, was a title in the Baronetage of England. It was created on 4 February 1686 for Nicholas Shireburn. His only son predeceased him and the title became extinct on Shireburn's death in 1717. The substantial family estates devolved on his only surviving daughter, Maria Winifred Francisca Shireburn, wife of Thomas Howard, 8th Duke of Norfolk. The Duchess of Norfolk died childless in 1754 when the Shireburn estates passed to Weld cousins at Lulworth Castle, through her aunt Elizabeth Shireburn. In 1794 Thomas Weld (of Lulworth) donated the Stonyhurst estate to the English Jesuits whose school on the continent was in danger from the French Revolutionary Wars, and it became the site of a Catholic school, Stonyhurst College.

All Hallows Church, Great Mitton has an outstanding group of memorial sculptures in its Shireburne Chapel.

== Shireburn baronets, of Stonyhurst (1686) ==
- Sir Nicholas Shireburn, 1st Baronet (died 1717)
  - Richard Francis Shireburn (1693–1702)
