= William Woodhouse (artist) =

English painter

William Arnold Woodhouse (1857–1939) was an English artist.

== His life and creative work ==
Woodhouse was born in Poulton le Sands, later the seaside town of Morecambe in Lancashire developed around this village. His parents also came from the same village. In 2001 one resident of Poulton discovered that Woodhouse had lived in his house in Poulton Road, and there is now a wall mural on that house "as part of the Poulton Heritage Mural Trail". In 1892, after his marriage, Woodhouse moved into a house on Chatsworth Road named Kenilcote. This house was designed by artist and featured in his oil painting The Reaper. In 1902, he and his wife moved into Auburn Court, a rural setting which inspired him in his work.

He specialized in animal portraits in the tradition of Landseer and was often praised for his artistic skill and realism. However, because he rarely travelled outside Lancashire, he did not achieve the full success or fame he deserved and is now mostly forgotten, even in the town of Morecambe itself. Many of his paintings have been sold at auction, among them was Pride of Place. It was sold at Bonhams Dogs in Show and Field in 2016 for $33,750.

He is buried with his wife and daughter at St. Peter's church in the village of Heysham, a little to the south of Morecambe.

Some of his paintings are on display in Lancaster City Museum in Lancaster and Lancaster Maritime Museum. William Woodhouse has had several gallery and museum exhibitions, including at the Chris Beetles Gallery.

== His selected works ==
- Majestic, 1909, Lancaster City Museum
- Still Life, Zetland Ville Roses, c. 1920, Lancaster Maritime Museum
- Study of a Head, oil on canvas, Lancaster Maritime Museum
- Geraniums, oil on board, 1880–1939, Lancaster Maritime Museum
- Sailing Ships and Steamer, oil on canvas, Lancaster Maritime Museum
- Edith Emsley, oil on canvas, 1880–1939, Lancaster Maritime Museum
- Roy Woodhouse, oil on canvas, c. 1890, Lancaster Maritime Museum
- Liver Spaniel with the Days Bag, oil on canvas
- Black and Tan Spaniel with the Days Bag, oil on canvas
