= All Hallows Church, Great Mitton =

Coordinates: 53.8461°N 2.4339°W

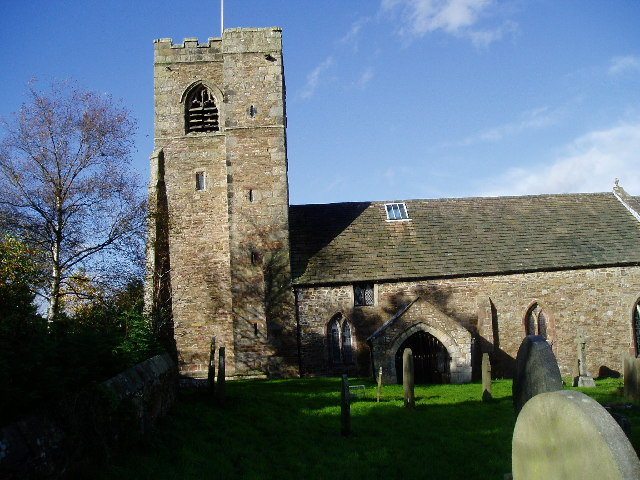
- All Hallows Church, Great Mitton, from the south

- Location in the Borough of Ribble Valley
- OS grid reference: SD 716 390
- Location: Great Mitton, Lancashire
- Country: England
- Denomination: Anglican
- Website: All Hallows, Mitton

History
- Status: Parish church

Architecture
- Functional status: Active
- Heritage designation: Grade I
- Designated: 16 November 1954
- Architectural type: Church
- Style: Gothic

Specifications
- Materials: Sandstone, stone slate roof

Administration
- Province: York
- Diocese: Blackburn
- Archdeaconry: Blackburn
- Deanery: Whalley
- Parish: Mitton

Clergy
- Vicar: Rev'd Canon Brian McConkey

All Hallows Church, Great Mitton, is in the village of Great Mitton, Lancashire, England. It is an active Anglican parish church in the deanery of Whalley, the archdeaconry of Blackburn, and the Diocese of Blackburn. Its benefice is united with that of St. John's Church, Hurst Green The church is recorded in the National Heritage List for England as a designated Grade I listed building.

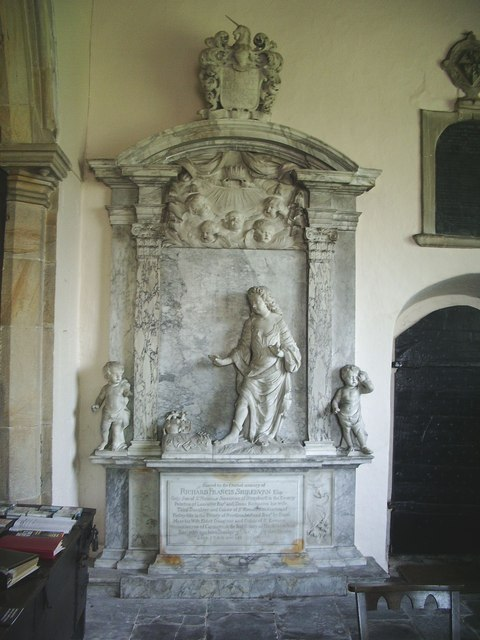
Monument to Richard, the last male Shireburn, died aged 9

It has an outstanding group of memorial sculptures for the Shireburn baronets in its Shireburne Chapel. Though buried in an Anglican church, all were Catholics, and the later ones Jacobites.

== History ==
The oldest fabric in the church dates from the late 13th century. The tower was added in the early 15th century, followed by the north chapel in the 16th century. The church was refurbished in 2000.

== Architecture ==
All Hallows is constructed in sandstone with a stone slate roof. The south wall of the chancel is pebbledashed. The plan consists of a nave, a narrower chancel, a north (Shireburne) chapel, a south porch, and a west tower. The tower is in three stages, with diagonal buttresses. It has a west doorway, a four-light west window, and two-light bell openings. On its summit is an embattled parapet. The windows along the sides of the nave have two lights with Y-tracery. There is a priest's door on the south wall of the chancel. The east window has five lights.

Inside the church is a west gallery. The chancel screen includes some medieval woodwork, which possibly came from Sawley Abbey. In the chancel are a triple sedilia and a piscina. The chapel contains memorials to the Shireburn family, dating from the late 16th to the early 18th century.

There is a ring of six bells. The earliest two were cast in 1567, possibly in France. These are followed by a bells of 1624 by William Oldfield, of 1726 by Samuel Smith II, of 1834 by Thomas Mears II from the Whitechapel Bell Foundry, and of 1872 by John Taylor and Company.

== External features ==
In the churchyard is a sandstone sundial dated 1683, with a brass gnomon and plate. It has been listed at Grade II. Also listed at Grade II is a cross of 1897 with a 14th-century head, again in sandstone. It has a square base, which broaches to a tapering octagonal shaft.

== See also ==
- Grade I listed churches in Lancashire
- Listed buildings in Great Mitton
