= Edisford Bridge =

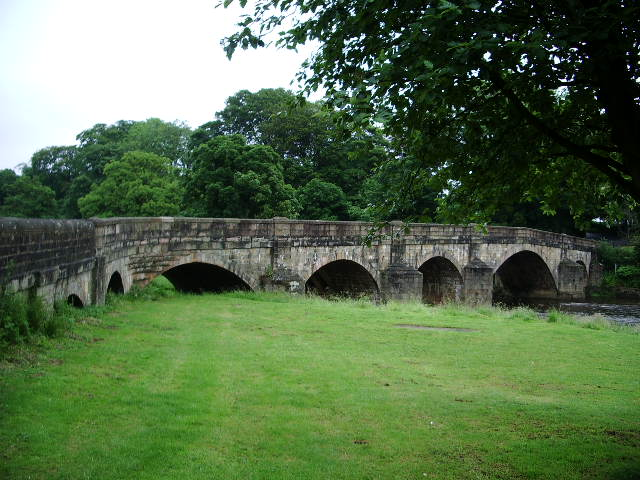
- The southern side of the bridge in 2007
- Coordinates: 53.8685°N 2.4177°W
- Carries: B6243 (Edisford Road)
- Crosses: River Ribble
- Locale: Clitheroe, Lancashire, England
- Heritage status: Grade II listed Scheduled monument

Characteristics
- Longest span: 17.98 metres (59 ft)

Statistics
- Daily traffic: Yes
- Toll: No

Edisford Bridge (or Eadsford) is a toll-free, nine-span bridge over the River Ribble near Clitheroe, Lancashire, England. A Grade II listed structure and a Scheduled monument, located about a mile WSW of the centre of town, it crosses the river to the civil parish of Great Mitton. The bridge carries the two-lane traffic of the B6243 Edisford Road.

The age of the current sandstone bridge is uncertain, it has been heavily modified, but the oldest parts are possibly of late-medieval construction. A bridge already existed here in 1339, as a grant of pontage was issued to fund repairs after damage by a flood. The nine spans vary in width, four arches crossing the river channel on the east side and a further five partly buried arches with a tight bend over meadow land on the west. On the northern side, three of the spans are pointed arches with Gothic ribs on the soffits, the rest being segmental. The piers have triangular cutwaters, and the parapets are solid with a string course.

The largest arch is the second from the eastern side at 17.98 metres (59.0 ft) across, it is thought to have replaced two earlier arches before 1799, when it featured in a painting by J. M. W. Turner. Before 1903 the bridge was widened over its full length on the southern, downstream, side from c.2.4 metres (8 ft) to about 6.1 metres (20 ft).

The bridge was Grade II listed in two stages, the four arches at the eastern end (then within the municipal borough of Clitheroe) on 19 May 1950, and remaining the five arches (in Bowland Rural District) on 16 November 1954. It has also been listed as a Scheduled Monument.

== See also ==
- Listed buildings in Clitheroe
- Listed buildings in Great Mitton
- Scheduled monuments in Lancashire
