= Ribble and Alt Estuaries (protected area) =

Protected area in North West England

Ribble Estuary
- Site of Special Scientific Interest
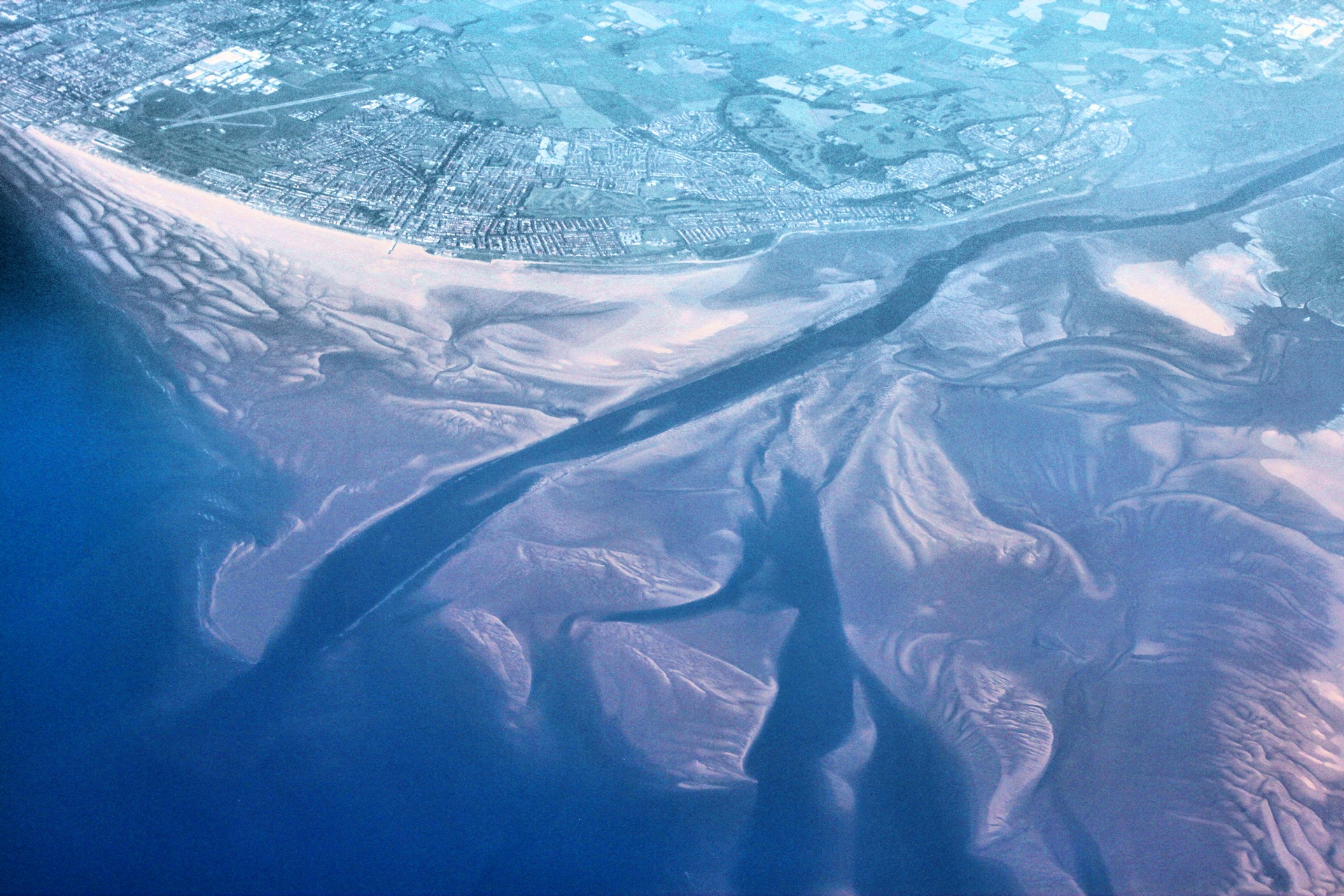
- Aerial view of the Ribble Estuary

- Location in Lancashire Location in Merseyside
- Location of Ribble Estuary.
- Area of search: Merseyside and Lancashire
- Grid reference: SD375240
- Coordinates: 53.71°N 2.97°W
- Interest: Biological
- Area: 9,226.3 ha (22,799 acres)
- Notification date: 1966 (Southport Sanctuary); 1976 (Ribble Estuary); 1984

Ramsar Wetland
- Designated: 28 November 1985
- Reference no.: 325

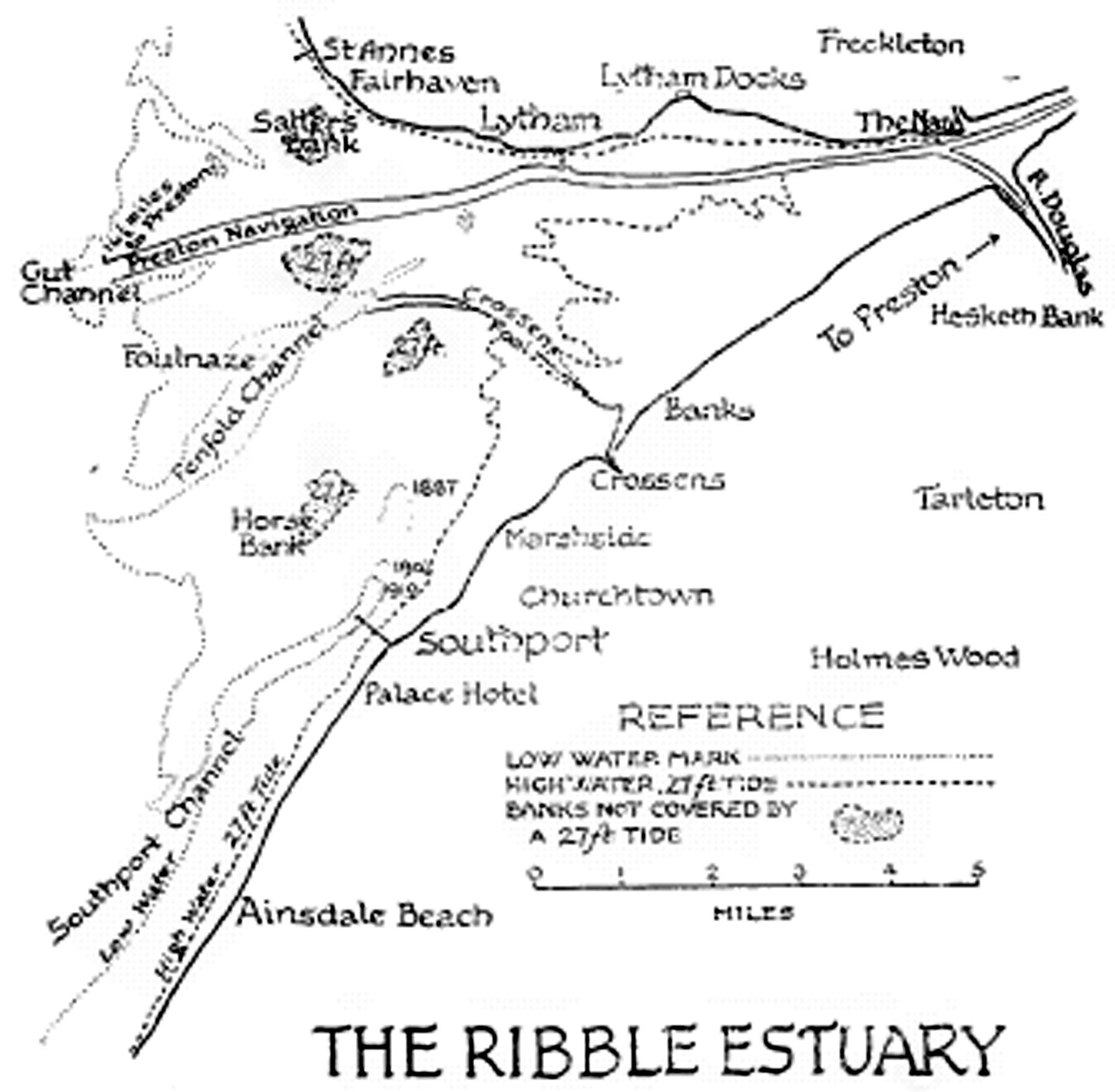
The Ribble Estuary in 1917

The estuaries of the River Ribble and River Alt lie on the Irish Sea coasts of Lancashire and Merseyside in North West England. Together they, and the area of salt marsh, mudflats, and sand dunes between them, form a Special Protection Area and Ramsar site which extends along the coastline between Crosby and Lytham St Annes.

These protected areas overlap with two separate sites of special scientific interest, Ribble Estuary and Sefton Coast.

== Protected area ==
A large number of different species of waders and wildfowl, listed below, use the estuaries as feeding and over-wintering areas. This wide variety of bird species has led to the estuaries being officially designated as a Special Protection Area and as a Ramsar site. The Ribble Estuary has been designated a Site of Special Scientific Interest since 1966 and is now covered by Natural England's Ribble Estuary National Nature Reserve.

== Site ==
The Ribble Marshes National Nature Reserve is 2,302 ha (5,688 acres) in extent and it is located in the middle of the SSSI which extends to 9,226 ha (22,798 acres). There are extensive areas of intertidal sand and silt flats, and expanses of saltmarsh. The mudflats have a large invertebrate fauna on which the waders and waterbirds feed. The saltmarshes are dominated by saltmarsh grass and red fescue with cord-grass on the seaward edge. The Ramsar wetlands extend to 13,464 ha (33,270 acres) and include an area of sand dunes which has interesting vegetation and provides habitat for important populations of amphibians. The whole site is of great importance to internationally important numbers of wintering waterbirds.

== Species ==
Birds that breed at the site include common tern (Sterna hirundo), lesser black-backed gull (Larus fuscus) and ruff (Philomachus pugnax). Migratory species that visit in spring and autumn include ringed plover (Charadrius hiaticula) and sanderling (Calidris alba).

Birds that over-winter here include bar-tailed godwit (Limosa lapponica), black-tailed godwit (Limosa limosa islandica), Bewick's swan (Cygnus columbianus bewickii), dunlin (Calidris alpina alpina), golden plover (Pluvialis apricaria), grey plover (Pluvialis squatarola), knot (Calidris canutus), oystercatcher (Haematopus ostralegus), pink-footed goose (Anser brachyrhynchus), pintail (Anas acuta), redshank (Tringa totanus), sanderling (Calidris alba), shelduck (Tadorna tadorna), teal (Anas crecca), whooper swan (Cygnus cygnus) and Eurasian wigeon (Anas penelope).
