= River Ribble =

River in North Yorkshire and Lancashire, England

Coordinates: 53°45′N 2°46′W

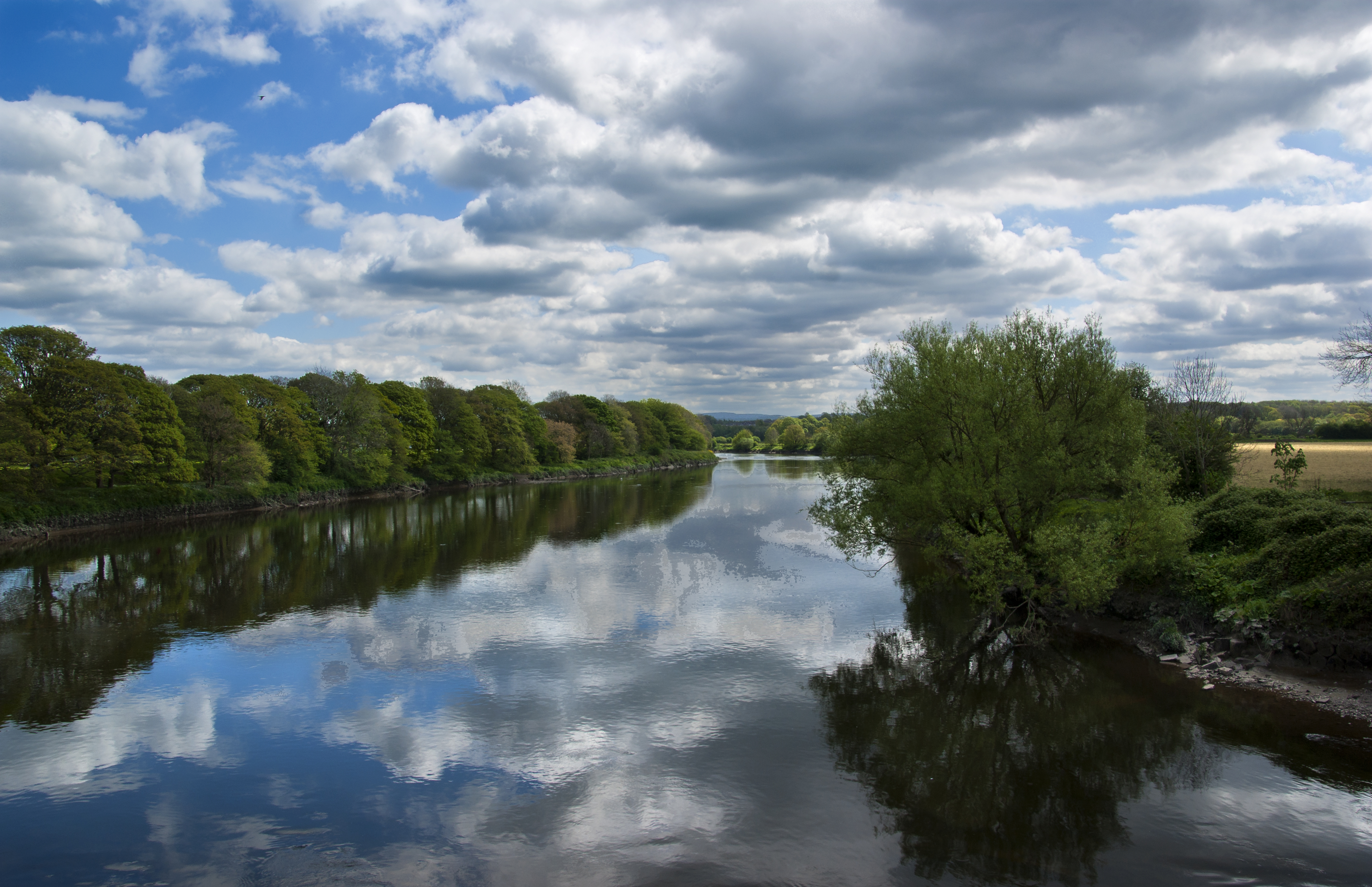
- River Ribble at Preston

Location
- Country: England
- County: Lancashire; North Yorkshire

Physical characteristics
- Source
  - location: Confluence of Gayle Beck and Cam Beck, Selside, Ribblehead
  - elevation: 807 ft (246 m)
- Mouth
  - location: Irish Sea at Lytham
- Length: 75 mi (121 km)

Basin features
- Conservation: Ribble Rivers Trust

The River Ribble is a river that flows through North Yorkshire and Lancashire in Northern England. It has a length of approximately 75 miles (121 kilometres) from its source near Selside in Ribblesdale to its estuary on the Irish Sea.

From its source, the Ribble flows in a generally southerly direction past Settle, then turns south-west near Gisburn and flows through Clitheroe, Ribchester and Preston. Its mouth is on the Irish Sea between Lytham St Annes and Southport. Its tributaries include the Hodder and Calder, which join the river less than 1 mile (1.6 kilometres) apart near Whalley in Lancashire; the Darwen, which joins at Walton-le-Dale; and the Douglas, which joins near Hesketh Bank. The Ribble is the only major river rising in Yorkshire which flows westward.

The Ribble Estuary is of particular ecological significance. It forms part of the Ribble and Alt Estuaries Ramsar site and the Ribble and Alt Estuaries Special Protection Area (SPA). The estuary is also included within the Ribble Estuary Marine Conservation Zone (MCZ), the Ribble Estuary Site of Special Scientific Interest (SSSI), and the Ribble Estuary National Nature Reserve.

== Etymology ==
The name Ribble may be a Brittonic compound-formation. The second element is the noun *pol, with connotations including "puddle, pond, upland-stream" (Welsh pwll). The first is rö-, an intensive prefix, with nouns meaning "great" (Welsh rhy-, Cornish re-).

Ribble may once have been known as *Bremetonā-, underlying the name Bremetenacum, the Roman fort at Ribchester. Involved here is the Brittonic root *breμ–, meaning "roaring" (cf. Welsh brefu), as observed at the river-names Breamish in Northumberland, Braan in Scotland and Brefi in Wales.

== History ==
Neolithic to Saxon finds from along the River Ribble during the creation of the Preston Docks and others revealed man has been in the area for a long time. The River Ribble looked completely different then and the coastline is likely to have been much further inland than it is at present where land has been reclaimed and the marsh extended out into the River Ribble due to sedimentation.

The Ribble would appear to have been known in Roman times as the Belisama, possibly giving its name to Samlesbury. Ptolemy's "Belisama aest." seems to represent the estuary of the Ribble. Bremetennacum was a Roman fort that guarded a crossing-point of the river at Ribchester. Remains of another Roman site were discovered at Walton-le-Dale in the mid-19th century.

The Cuerdale Hoard, the largest Viking silver hoard ever found outside Russia was discovered in 1840 on the southern bank of a bend of the river, at Cuerdale near Preston. Whilst the medieval silver Mitton Hoard was found near where this river joins the River Hodder in 2009.

At one time the Ribble marked the northernmost extent of the ancient kingdom of Mercia. At the time of the Domesday Book, the river formed the northern boundary of an area of land (known as Inter Ripam et Mersam) that was included in the Domesday information for Cheshire, though it was probably not formally part of the county of Cheshire.

Sawley Abbey was founded by Cistercian monks in 1147, at a bend in the river. It is thought that the monks built a weir to supply a mill race that powered a corn mill within the abbey precinct.

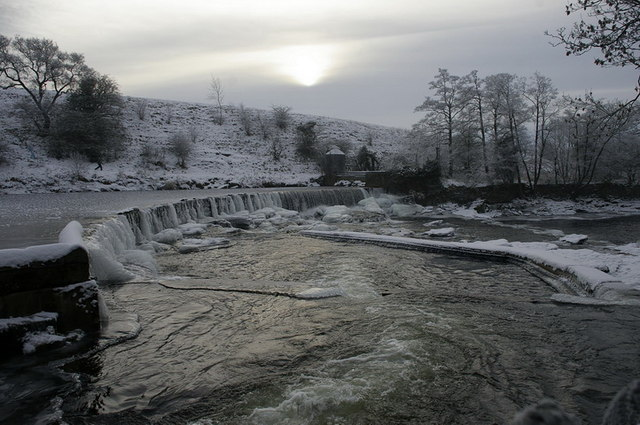
Brungerley Weir near Waddow Hall.

After his defeat in the Battle of Hexham in 1464 (during the Wars of the Roses), King Henry VI went into hiding at a number of houses belonging to his supporters. A little over a year later he was at Waddington Hall in Waddington. On 13 July 1465, a group of Yorkists, including the property-owner's brother, arrived at the hall to arrest him. Escaping into nearby woods, Henry was captured soon after crossing the river at the old stepping stones at Brungerley.

Around 1785, a large weir was constructed across the river, slightly downstream at Waddow Hall, to supply water to a cotton mill at Low Moor. The site relied on water power right up to closure around 1930, although the water wheels gradually gave way to water turbines and were augmented by steam engines.

During 2009, an Archimedean screw type hydropower station was constructed at Settle weir near Bridge End Mill. Built for a community-owned company, Settle Hydro, the site became operational by the end of the year. As of February 2024, the generator has produced 1.2 million kWh of electricity.

Samlesbury Weir was constructed in the 1970s as a hydrometric gauging station by the local water authority for the purpose of measuring low flows on the River Ribble. The structure subsequently became redundant. In 2020 it was removed as part of a river restoration scheme intended to increase biodiversity and to facilitate the free passage of migratory fish species, including salmon, smelt and eels.

== Geography ==
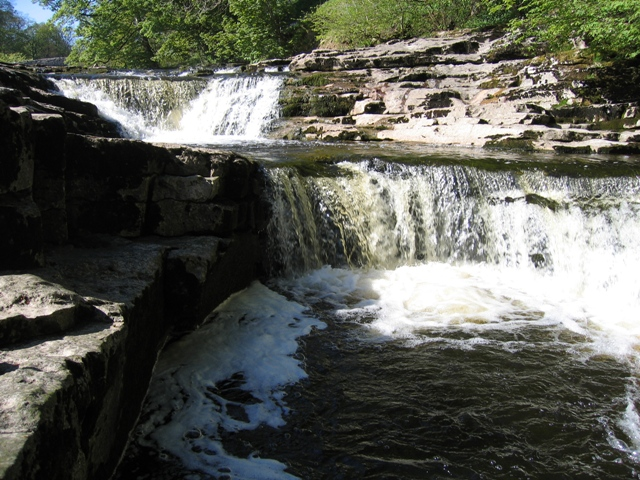
Stainforth Force

The Ribble begins at the confluence of the Gayle Beck and Batty Wife Beck near the viaduct at Ribblehead, in the shadow of the Yorkshire Three Peaks. It is the only major river rising in Yorkshire which flows westward. It flows through Settle, Clitheroe, Ribchester and Preston, before emptying into the Irish Sea between Lytham St Annes and Southport, a length of 75 miles (121 km). Its main tributaries are the Hodder and Calder which join the river near Great Mitton, the River Darwen which joins at Walton-le-Dale and the River Douglas which joins near Hesketh Bank.

Above Hellifield the valley of the river is known as Ribblesdale.

The Ribble Way is a long-distance footpath which follows the river for much of its course. The river is connected to both the Leeds and Liverpool Canal and the Lancaster Canal (via the Ribble Link). The river downstream of Preston was actively dredged when Preston was an active port; this is no longer done and silt from the river is now spreading more widely over the (sand) beaches around Fairhaven and St Annes.

Its 10-mile-wide (16 km) estuary forms part of the Ribble and Alt Estuaries Special Protection Area for wildlife. An average of 340,000 water birds over-winter in the estuary making it the most important wetland site in Britain. The Ribble is also a key breeding ground for the endangered Atlantic salmon.

1.25 million people live in the Ribble's catchment area.

== Tidal regime and estuarine processes ==
The Normal Tidal Limit (NTL) of the river is at Fishwick Bottoms, between Preston and Walton-le-Dale, 11 miles (18 km) from the sea. The River Ribble has the third-largest tides in England, with tides that run at 4 knots (5 mph; 7 km/h) and a tidal range at the mouth of the river of 30 feet (9 m) during spring tides.

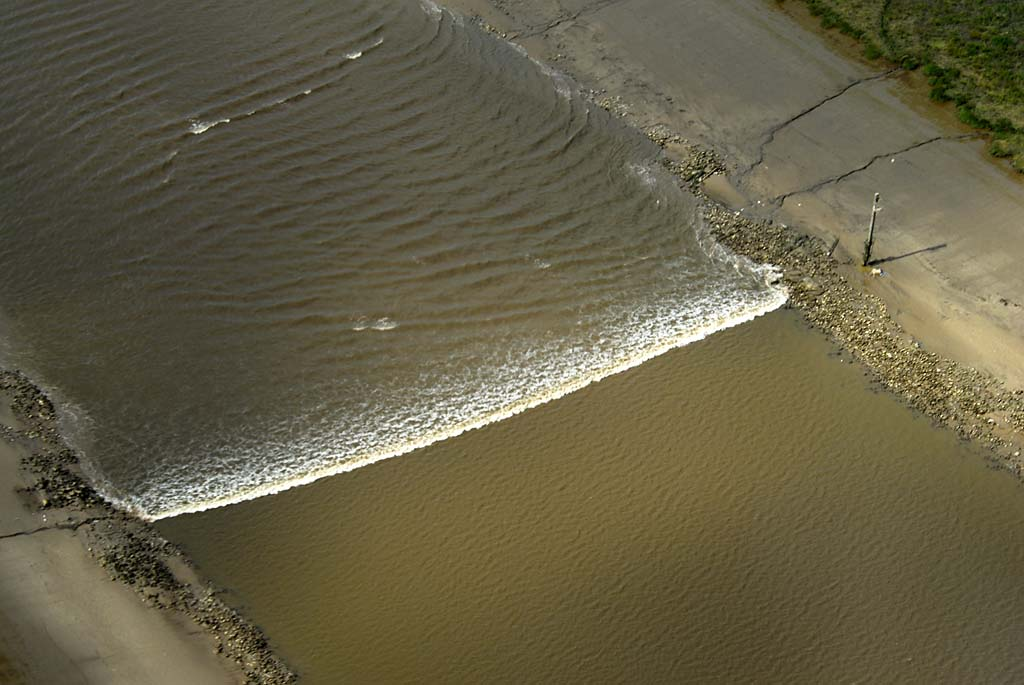
Tidal bore on the Ribble, between the River Douglas and Preston

The estuary is strongly flood-dominant. At Preston the flood tide lasts approximately 2.5 hours compared with an ebb duration of around 10 hours, and peak flood velocities exceed those of the ebb. On spring tides, a tidal bore can travel upstream as far as Preston Dock at speeds of approximately 4 knots (5 mph; 7 km/h). The bore's wave height at Hutton Sands can be 3 feet (0.91 m) and decreases as it travels further up-river.

On the River Ribble, the tidal bore acts as a hydrodynamic "front," marking the abrupt transition from the prolonged low-water stand to a compressed flood tide. While the Irish Sea rises for over six hours, the narrowing 19th-century training walls funnel the tide into a singular surge, compressing the flood duration at Preston to approximately 90 minutes. The bore typically arrives at the tidal limit 60–90 minutes before the High Water Stand; although the visible wave often dissipates well before reaching the sandstone at Fishwick, its arrival provides the hydraulic momentum that drives the upstream current against existing downstream flows. This maintains the river's characteristic "out of phase" relationship, where the current continues to flow inland even after the vertical water level has reached its maximum elevation.

At the estuary mouth, near Lytham St Annes, the tidal cycle follows a standard symmetrical sine curve, with the flood and ebb durations being roughly equal. However, as the tide travels 15 miles (24 km) inland to the Port of Preston and beyond, it transforms into an asymmetrical saw-tooth curve.

A defining peculiarity of this distortion at the tidal limit is the High Water Stand, a "vertical plateau" where the water level remains stationary at its maximum elevation for 45–60 minutes. This stand typically extends for approximately one mile downstream from the tidal limit at Fishwick Bottoms, where the rising sandstone bedrock creates a hydraulic "backwater" effect. During this period, the vertical height and the horizontal flow are out of phase; the flood current may continue to flow upstream due to hydraulic momentum even after the vertical "Stand" has commenced. Although the water level has stopped rising, this continued inflow results in "flow convergence," where the momentum of the incoming tide is dissipated against the stationary volume of the backwater. This results in a prolonged period of Slack Water (zero-velocity current) that can last nearly an hour at the tidal limit, compared to the brief 15-minute transition observed at the coast.

Since River Ribble dredging ceased, the estuary is filling with sand and is developing a meandering path, depending on the tides and river runoff. In addition, many tributaries flow into the main channel including the Savick Brook/Ribble Link, while the River Douglas, has a significant influence both on sediment transport and hydrodynamics of the estuary.

== Modern navigation ==
Following the closure of the Port of Preston to commercial traffic in 1981, navigation on the River Ribble has shifted toward leisure and recreational use and limited commercial deliveries.

The river presents significant challenges due to its macro-tidal nature, featuring 4-knot currents and the third-largest tidal range in England. Since the cessation of commercial dredging in the early 1980s, the channel has naturally begun to infill with sediment and re-establish a meandering path, making navigation strictly dependent on high-water windows The Millennium Ribble Link provides a vital modern connection, allowing inland waterway craft to traverse the tidal Ribble to reach previously disconnected canal systems.

=== Irish Sea to the Port of Preston ===
Navigating from the Irish Sea to the former Port of Preston (now Preston Marina) requires careful adherence to waypoints and tidal timings due to shifting sandbanks and the presence of submerged training walls.

The Gut Buoy (53° 42.45' N, 03° 04.30' W) marks the transition from the outer estuary to the narrowed "Gut" channel, acting as the seaward entrance to the passage constrained by stone training walls.

=== The Ribble Link Crossing ===
The Millennium Ribble Link provides a navigable corridor between the Leeds and Liverpool Canal (via the River Douglas) and the Lancaster Canal (via Savick Brook).

Navigation of the tidal crossing is guided by the Asland Lamp (the 5-mile perch), which is used as a navigational reference in passage instructions for the Ribble Link.

== Crossings ==
There was a bridge at Edisford, Clitheroe in 1339. The age of the present sandstone bridge is not known, but parts contain features indicating they may date to the late medieval period. The current Ribchester Bridge dates from 1774. It replaced one built in 1669, which also had a predecessor of unknown age.

Evidence of a bridge between Preston and Walton-le-Dale occurs in a deed in the early 13th century. A stone bridge was built in the early 1400s, possibly just west of the present Walton Bridge which was completed in 1781. Until 1755 this was the only bridge over the Ribble at Preston. The original attempt to build a bridge directly to Penwortham was completed in 1755, only to collapse the following year. The Penwortham Old Bridge opened in 1759 to replace it. In 1802 the Lancaster Canal Company completed a timber trestle bridge to facilitate a temporary tramroad to connect the two isolated sections of the canal. The missing section was never completed and, although heavily modified, the disused Old Tram Bridge still stands today.

=== Ferries (historic) ===
Several ferry crossings were marked along the lower part of the river, on the first Ordnance Survey map of Lancashire, published in the 1840s. The Hacking Ferry near Hacking Hall and Trowers Ferry near Dinckley Hall. Another, downstream of Osbaldeston Hall and the Balderstone Hall Ferry. Also at Samlesbury Church as well as an old boat house, upstream of Penwortham Old Bridge.

It is uncertain when these services began. A 1354 charter assigned some land for the use of the ferryman near Ribchester, possibly referring to the crossing near Osbaldeston Hall. The Hacking Ferry seems to have been funded by the Shireburn family of Stonyhurst, and established during the 1600s. It continued operating as a regular toll service until 1938, but continued occasionally afterward until it finally ceased operation in 1955. In later years it operated two johnboat-type rowing boats. The older boat could carry twelve passengers and a newer boat had a capacity of 19. The former is now in the collection at Clitheroe Castle Museum.

=== Estuary crossing proposals ===
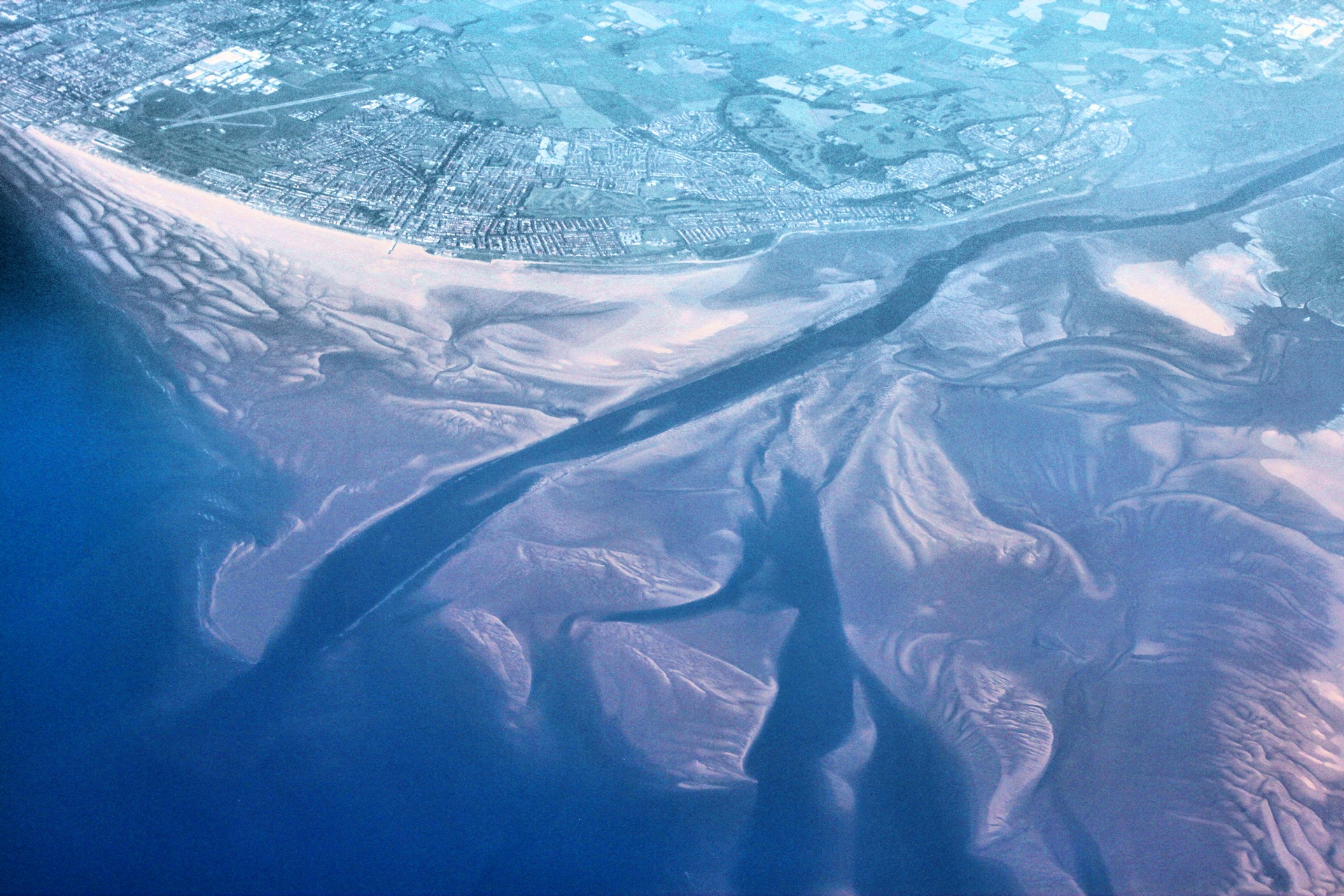
Ribble estuary

A Ribble estuary fixed crossing has been proposed on several occasions, to provide a quicker route between the seaside resorts of Southport and Blackpool. Two routes for a tramroad were proposed; the first in 1899 outlined a route between Crossens and Lytham, then between 1900 and 1906 as a route from Crossens to Warton via Hesketh Bank. A railway tunnel was proposed in 1907, between Hesketh Bank and Warton. A bridge was proposed between 1938 and 1947. A road link was campaigned for in 2007, envisaging a development similar to the Rance Tidal Power Station in Brittany. In 2011, an April fools' joke suggested a 9-mile-long (14 km) road tunnel from Marshside to Lytham St Annes.

== Ecology ==
The River Ribble catchment is covered by the Ribble Rivers Trust, a UK based charity working to improve, protect and promote the River Ribble for both people and wildlife. The Ribble Estuary is part of an Internationally important Ramsar Wetland site, a Special Protection Area (SPA) under the Joint Nature Conservation Committee, a Marine Conservation Zone up to Samlesbury, Site of Special Scientific Interest (SSSI), a National Nature Reserve, and is under development as a Coast & Wetlands Regional Park.

Preston City Council published plans to build a barrage across the River Ribble, in their 'Riverworks' proposals (2006). The aim of these proposals was to build a barrage and a water sports park on a section of the Ribble, coupled with over 4,000 units of housing and businesses in the river's flood plain. Some local residents opposed these plans, arguing that they endanger wildlife, increase flood risk to local housing and damage greenbelt areas. These residents set up the Save The Ribble campaign, and their two-year information campaign successfully overturned Preston City Council's proposals, and South Ribble Borough Council announced the alternative creation of a Country Park. Parts of the river are a County Biological Heritage Site.

== Human-origin discharges and remedies ==
=== Industrial effluent via the "Rainbow River" (River Darwen) ===
The River Darwen is a major tributary that meets the River Ribble at Walton-le-Dale. For much of the 19th and 20th centuries, this waterway was known locally as the "Rainbow River". This name originated from the discharge of industrial effluent by businesses in Blackburn and Darwen.These included major paint works, such as the Walpamur Company, and various wallpaper and paper mills. The water changed colour daily based on the specific pigments used in production.

Visible dyes were accompanied by other chemical pollutants including heavy metals, bleaching agents, and ammonia. These substances travelled through the Darwen directly into the wider Ribble system. Such practices caused significant chemical pollution and damaged the local ecology. Strict environmental regulations introduced in the 1970s ended these discharges.

=== Courtaulds Red Scar Works ===
Courtaulds operated the Red Scar Works in Preston from 1939 to the late 1970s, producing viscose rayon. Viscose manufacture typically generated wastewater containing sulphuric acid, zinc compounds and organic residues from cellulose processing. The plant was a major industrial facility within the Ribble catchment.

=== Late 20th century sewage and urban runoff discharges (Preston) ===
During the late twentieth century, the Preston area experienced intermittent discharges of wastewater and urban runoff into the River Ribble and its estuary. A 2013 engineering assessment identified 32 unsatisfactory intermittent discharges across the Preston, Penwortham, Watery Lane, Lea Gate and Ribbleton catchments. Several of these outfalls affected the tidal section of the river. The discharges occurred when the combined sewer system reached capacity during periods of heavy rainfall. They consisted of foul sewage mixed with urban surface water, including rainwater and street runoff carrying general pollutants. The Environment Agency identified these discharges as affecting bathing water quality and designated shellfish areas.

=== Early 21st century sewage and urban runoff remedies (Preston) ===
Between 2010 and 2013, a programme of works was carried out to reduce the frequency of intermittent discharges of wastewater and urban runoff. The scheme included a 3.5km interceptor tunnel with large storm-storage capacity to replace older overflow points that had previously discharged to the Ribble and Savick Brook. It also introduced a series of detention shafts, tunnel sections, pumping improvements and raised weirs designed to intercept stormwater, sewage and urban runoff before these flows reached the river. These measures created additional storage within the combined sewer network and redirected flows for full treatment at Clifton Marsh Wastewater Treatment Works.

=== Highway runoff ===
==== Preston Area ====
A 2024 report by Stormwater Shepherds UK identified several highway runoff discharges into the River Ribble near Preston, including from Brockholes Brow, London Road and Church Brow, and said its London Road data suggested that highway runoff conveyed into the river via a surface water sewer causes pollution.

=== Uranium and radionuclide discharges from Springfields ===
Established in 1946, the Springfields facility at Salwick was the first plant in the world to manufacture commercial nuclear fuel. Throughout its history under UKAEA, BNFL, and currently Westinghouse, the site has processed uranium ore concentrate to produce fuel for nuclear fission reactors.

==== 1991 Uranium investigation and remediation ====
In 1991, an investigation by the ITV series World in Action and a report by environmentalist Nick Cassidy for Friends of the Earth (Profits Before Safety) highlighted high levels of uranium and thorium-234 in the Ribble's silt. The report alleged that the BNFL Springfields plant was discharging untreated waste into Savick Brook to avoid filtration costs, specifically impacting houseboat residents at Hesketh Bank. Following a 1991 Early Day Motion in Parliament, BNFL implemented decanter centrifuge technology to "scrub" the effluent, significantly reducing discharges by the mid-1990s.

==== Current situation ====
The Springfields nuclear fuel facility near Preston operates under a permit allowing regulated releases of uranium-bearing effluent, which enters the Ribble system via Savick Brook (the Ribble Link). These discharges are monitored by the Environment Agency and reported as remaining within authorised limits.

== Settlement ==
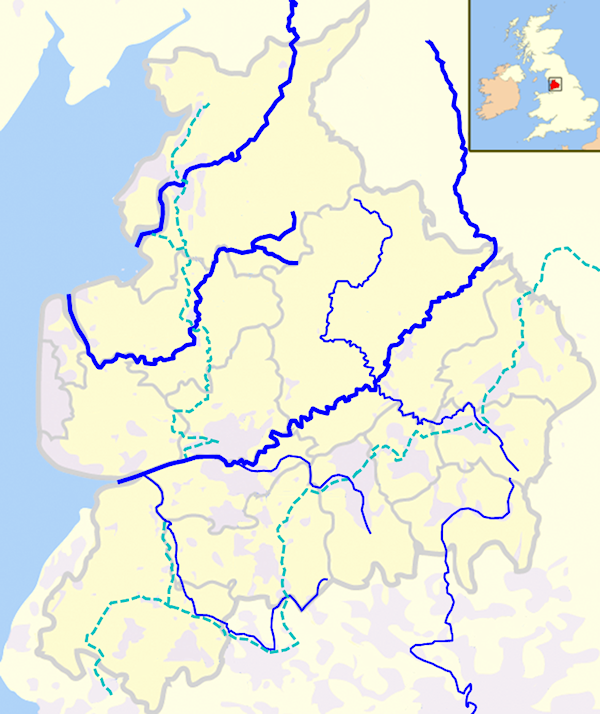
Shown with other rivers and canals in Lancashire

=== North Yorkshire ===
- Horton in Ribblesdale
- Stainforth
- Stackhouse
- Langcliffe
- Giggleswick
- Settle
- Halton West
- Nappa

=== Lancashire ===
- Paythorne
- Gisburn
- Sawley
- West Bradford
- Horrocksford
- Clitheroe
- Great Mitton
- Brockhall Village
- Little Town
- Ribchester
- Samlesbury
- Walton-le-Dale
- Preston
- Penwortham
- Tarleton
- Hundred End
- Banks
- Lytham

== Main tributaries ==
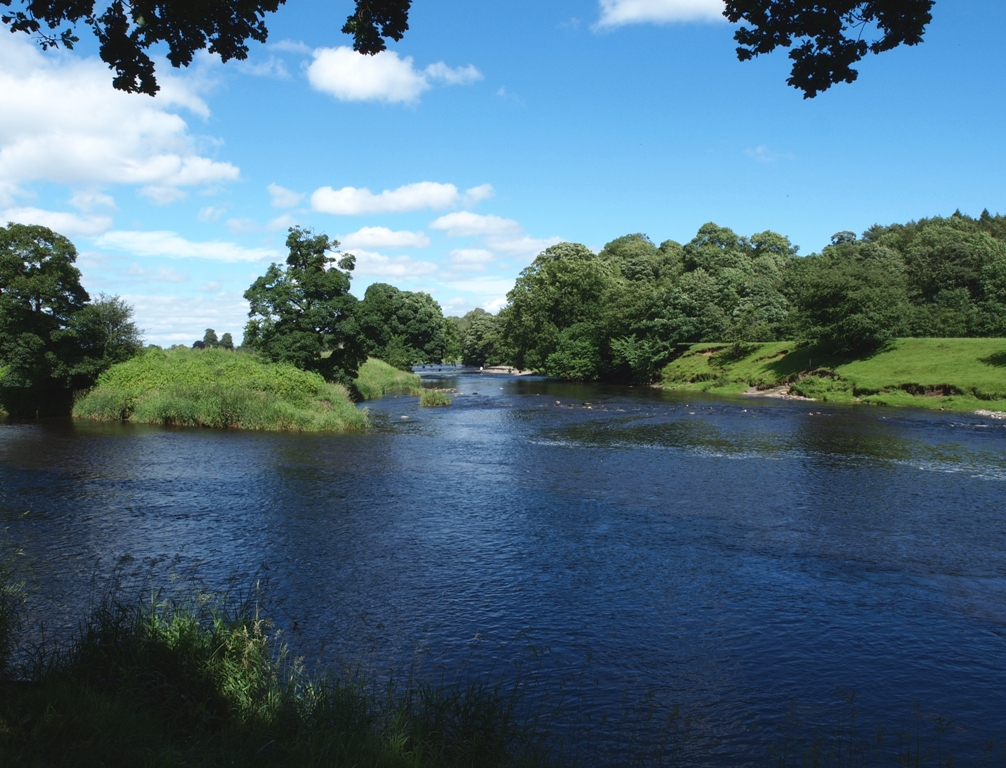
The confluence with the River Hodder.

- River Douglas or River Asland
- Savick Brook
- River Darwen
- Stydd Brook
- Dinckley Brook
- River Calder
- River Hodder

== Name ==
The River Ribble gives its name to the local government boroughs of Ribble Valley and South Ribble, and the Ribble Valley parliamentary constituency. The Ribble Bus Company once operated throughout North West England. The Ribble also lends its name to the Ribble Steam Railway.

== See also ==
- Geography of the United Kingdom
- List of rivers of England
- Longest rivers of the United Kingdom
