= Old Town Hall, Clitheroe =

Municipal building in Clitheroe, Lancashire, England

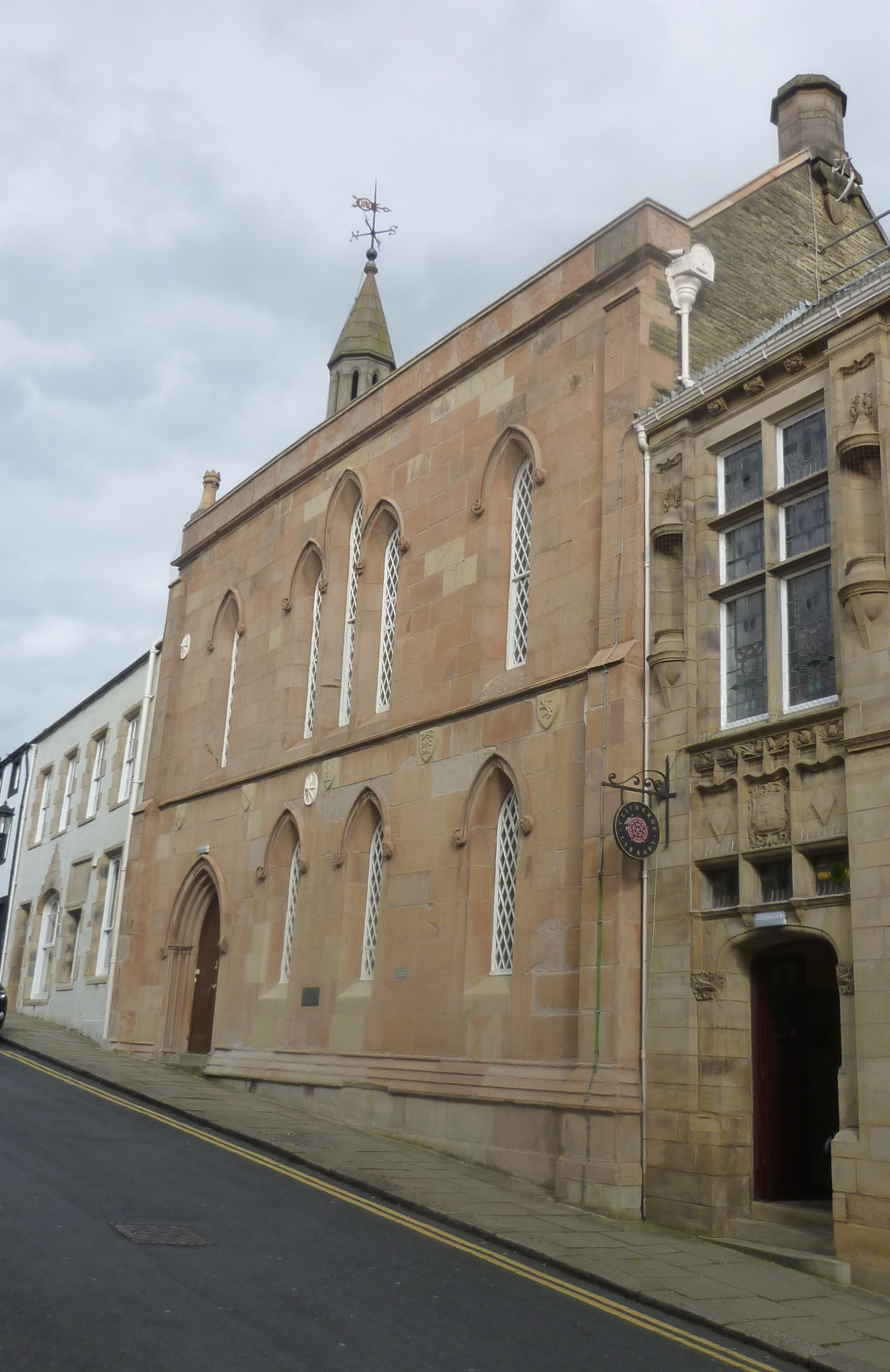
- Old Town Hall, Clitheroe

- Shown in Lancashire Location in Ribble Valley
- 53.8732°N 2.3905°W
- Location: Church Street, Clitheroe

History
- Built: 1820

Site notes
- Architect: Thomas Rickman
- Architectural style: Gothic Revival style

Listed Building – Grade II
- Official name: Town Hall
- Designated: 30 September 1976
- Reference no.: 1072374

The Old Town Hall, sometimes referred to as the Moot Hall, is a municipal building in Church Street, Clitheroe, Lancashire, England. The structure, which was the meeting place of Clitheroe Borough Council, is a Grade II listed building.

== History ==
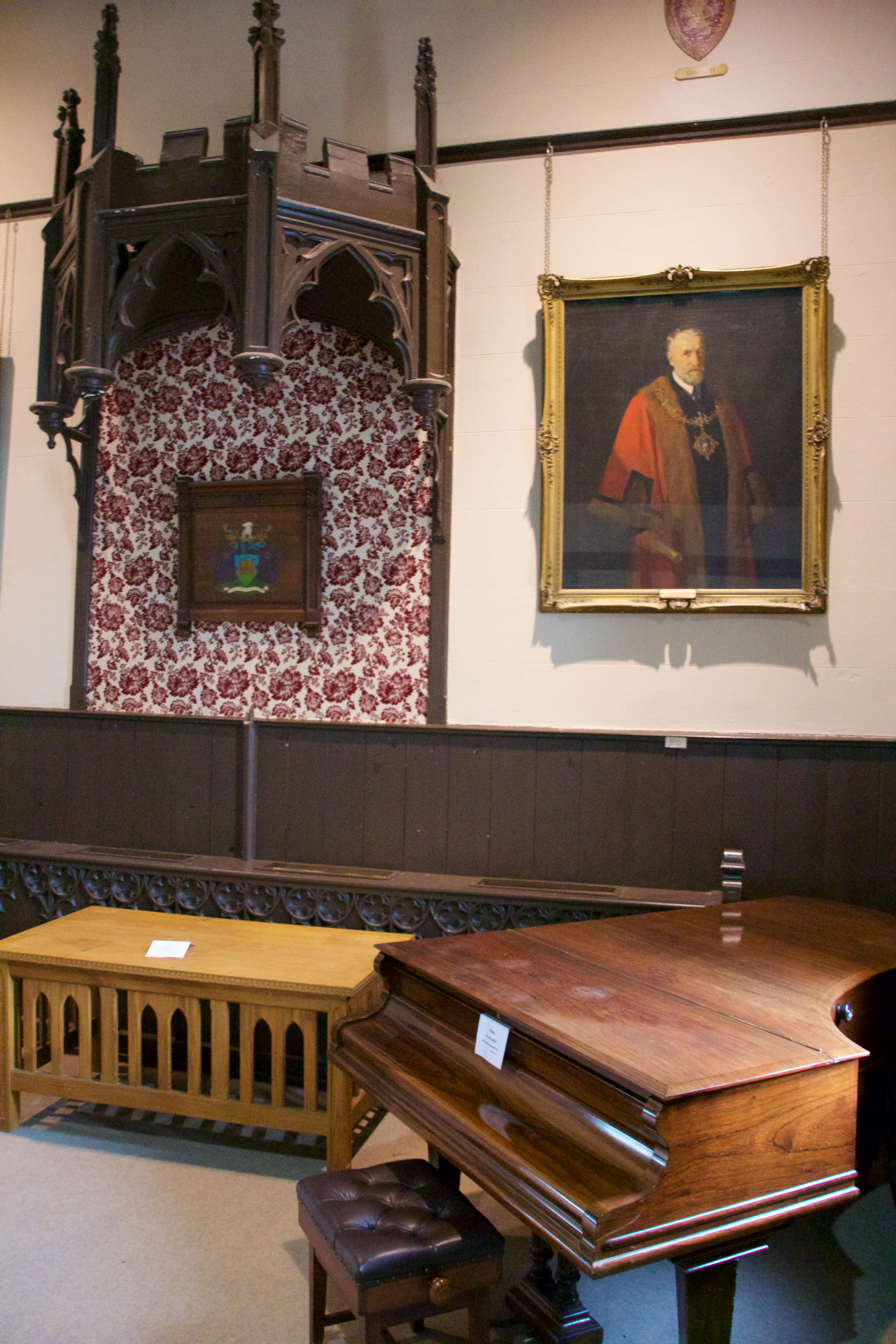
Inside the old town Hall: Gothic Revival fittings and a painting of an Edwardian mayor

The first municipal building in Clitheroe was a moot hall built on Church Street in about 1610. It contained prison cells with barrel vaulted ceilings which were cut out of solid rock and were used to accommodate petty criminals on their way to imprisonment in Lancaster Castle. In the early 19th century borough officials decided to demolish those parts of the old moot hall which were above ground and to erect a new structure on the same site.

The new building was designed by Thomas Rickman in the Gothic Revival style, built in ashlar stone and was completed in 1820. The design involved an asymmetrical main frontage with four bays facing onto the Church street; on the ground floor, there was an arched doorway flanked by colonettes in the left hand bay and lancet windows in the other bays. Between the storeys there were five armorial shields, on the first floor there was a central three-light window with lancet windows in the outer bays and, at roof level, there was an octagonal spire with a weathervane, which was 62 feet (19 m) high. Internally, the principal room was the council chamber which featured leaded windows and was accessed by a spiral staircase. The prison cells were retained, in situ, from the older building.

The quarterly assizes and the magistrates' court hearings were held in the building from about 1825 and the town became a municipal borough with the building as its headquarters in 1835. It was at the town hall that David Shackleton was elected unopposed as the Labour Member of Parliament in the 1902 Clitheroe by-election; he was only the third Labour MP ever to be elected to the UK Parliament.

The town hall continued to serve as the headquarters of the borough council for much of the 20th century but ceased to be the local seat of government when the enlarged Ribble Valley District Council was established in 1974. The district council was initially based at offices in Clitheroe Castle before moving to purpose-built offices in Church Walk in the late 1970s. Clitheroe Town Council, which was established in 1974, chose to establish its offices on the opposite side of the road in the former borough treasurer's office, No. 9 Church Street, rather than using the old town hall. However, the town council continued to use the old town hall for its annual mayor-making ceremonies. An extensive programme of refurbishment works was carried out in the late 1980s, enabling the town hall to be integrated into the Clitheroe Library: the council chamber was subsequently used as an events venue for lectures and concerts and the prison cells were used for storage purposes.

Works of art in the former council chamber include a portrait by the Australian painter, James Peter Quinn, of the local historian and author, William Self Weeks.

== See also ==
- Listed buildings in Clitheroe
