= Clitheroe Library =

Carnegie library in Lancashire, England

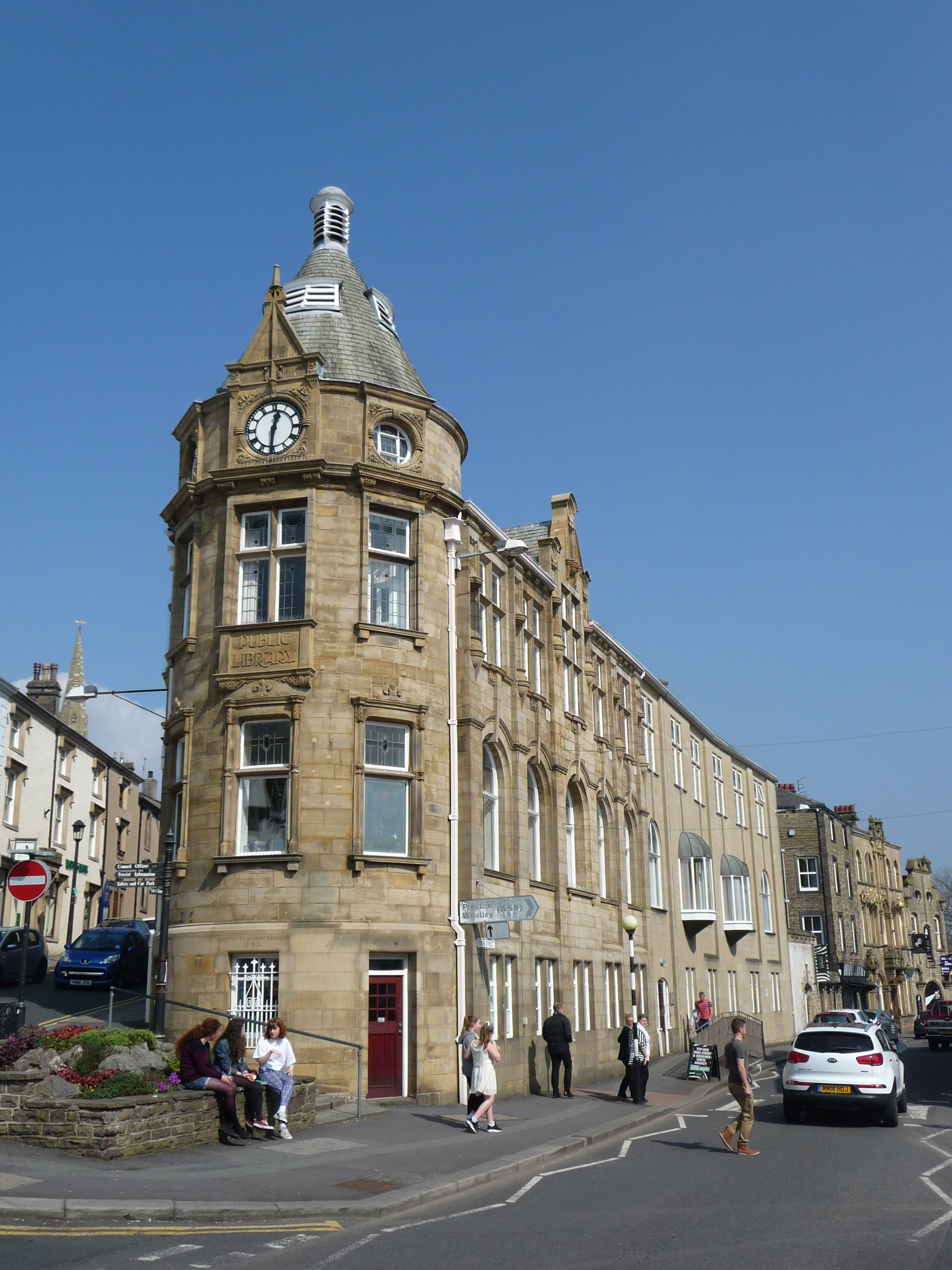
- 53.8730°N 2.3906°W
- Location: Clitheroe, Lancashire, England
- Established: 1905; 120 years ago

Other information
- Website: www.lancashire.gov.uk/libraries-and-archives/libraries/find-a-library/clitheroe-library.aspx

Clitheroe Library is a Carnegie library in Clitheroe, Lancashire, England. It was opened in 1905.

== History ==
The library was designed by the partnership of Briggs and Wolstenholme. It occupies a site at the fork of two roads and at the narrowest part features a turret with a clock and a conical roof. Historic England and the architectural historian Pevsner describe the style as "Loire" (referring to the Châteaux of the Loire Valley). Since 1976, it has been protected as a Grade II listed building. It still serves its original purpose as a public library. In 1990, there was a major refurbishment and the library was extended into the adjacent building, the Old Town Hall.

== Gallery ==
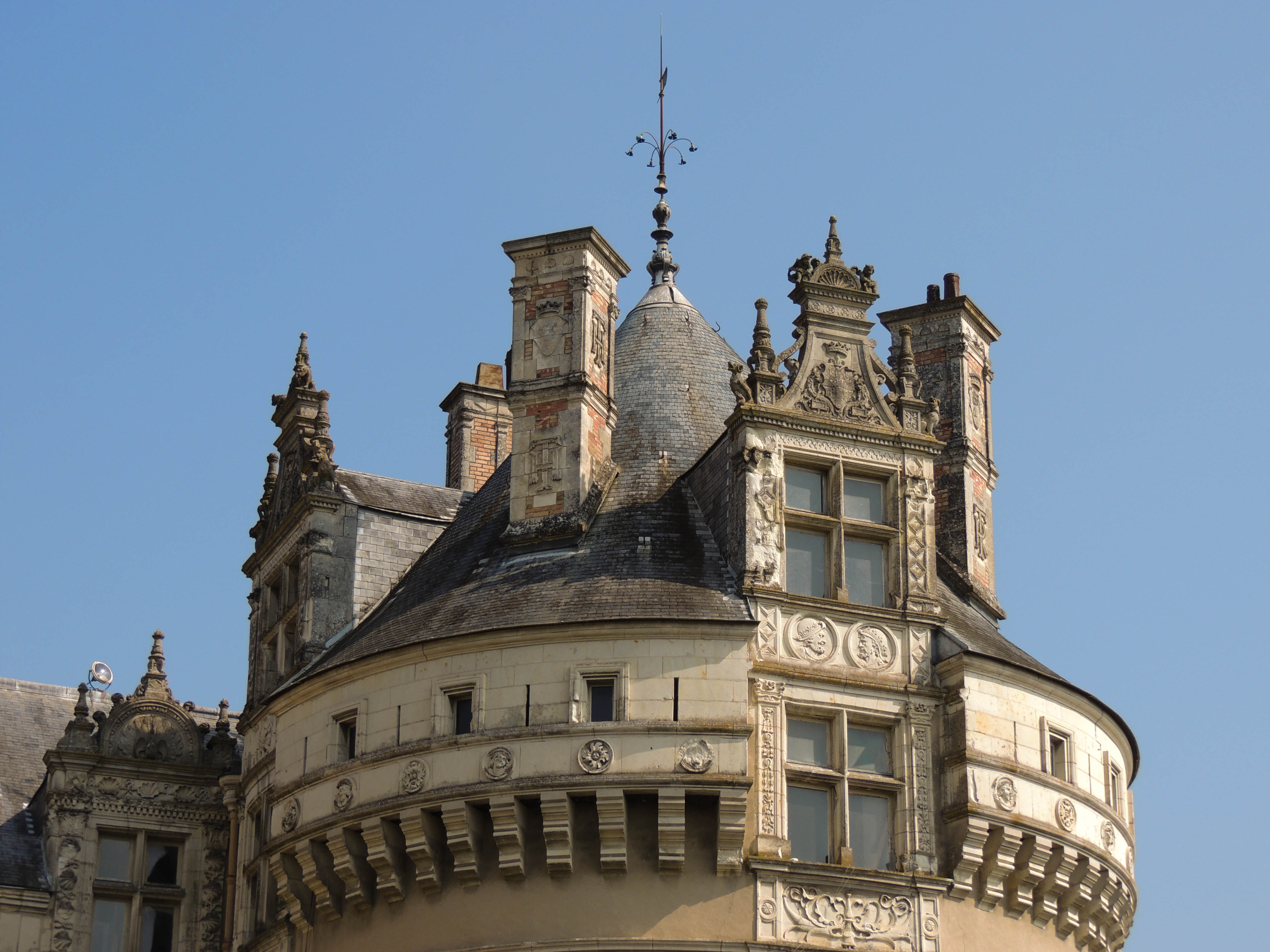
French Renaissance architecture, a possible source of inspiration for Clitheroe Library

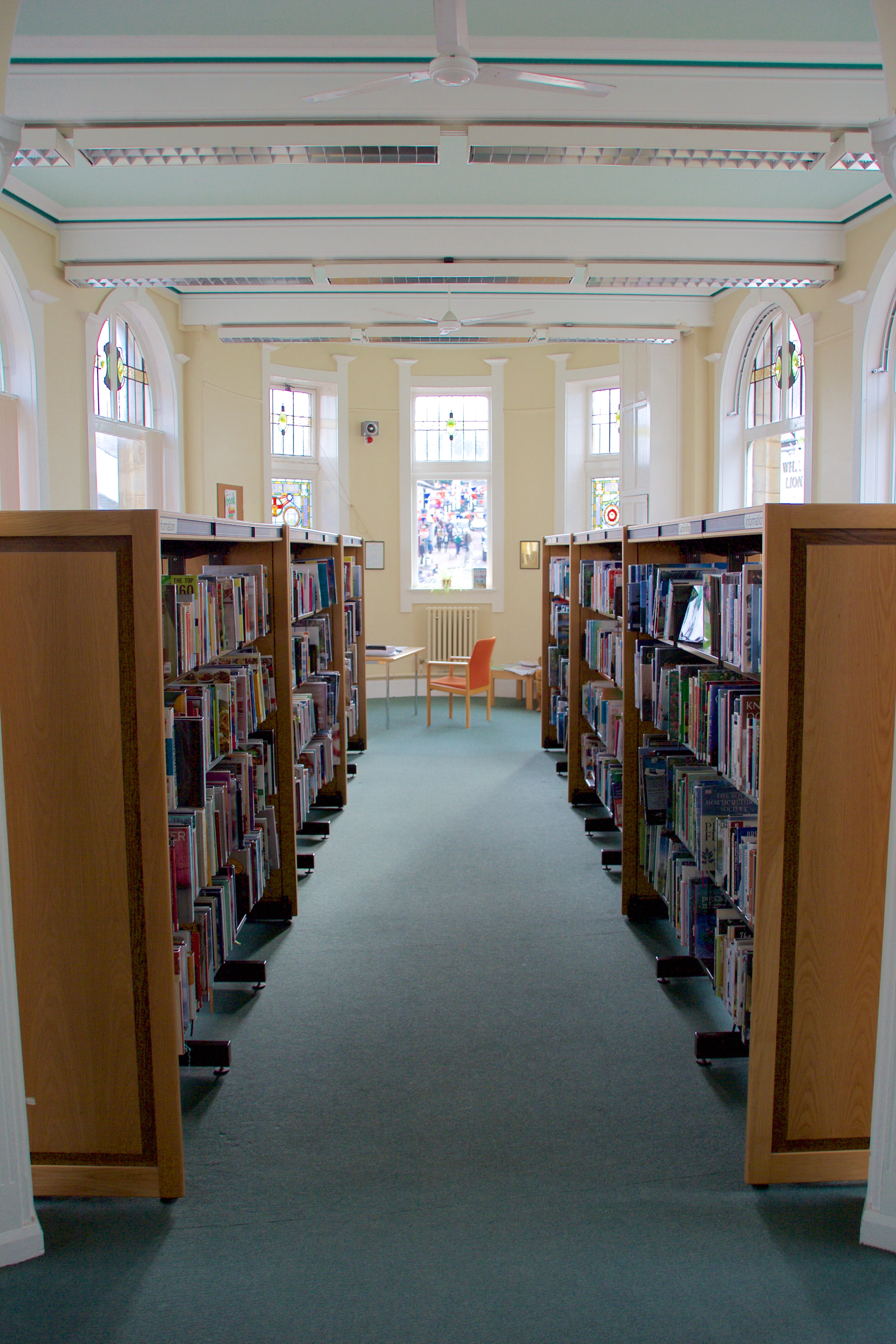
The interior of the library

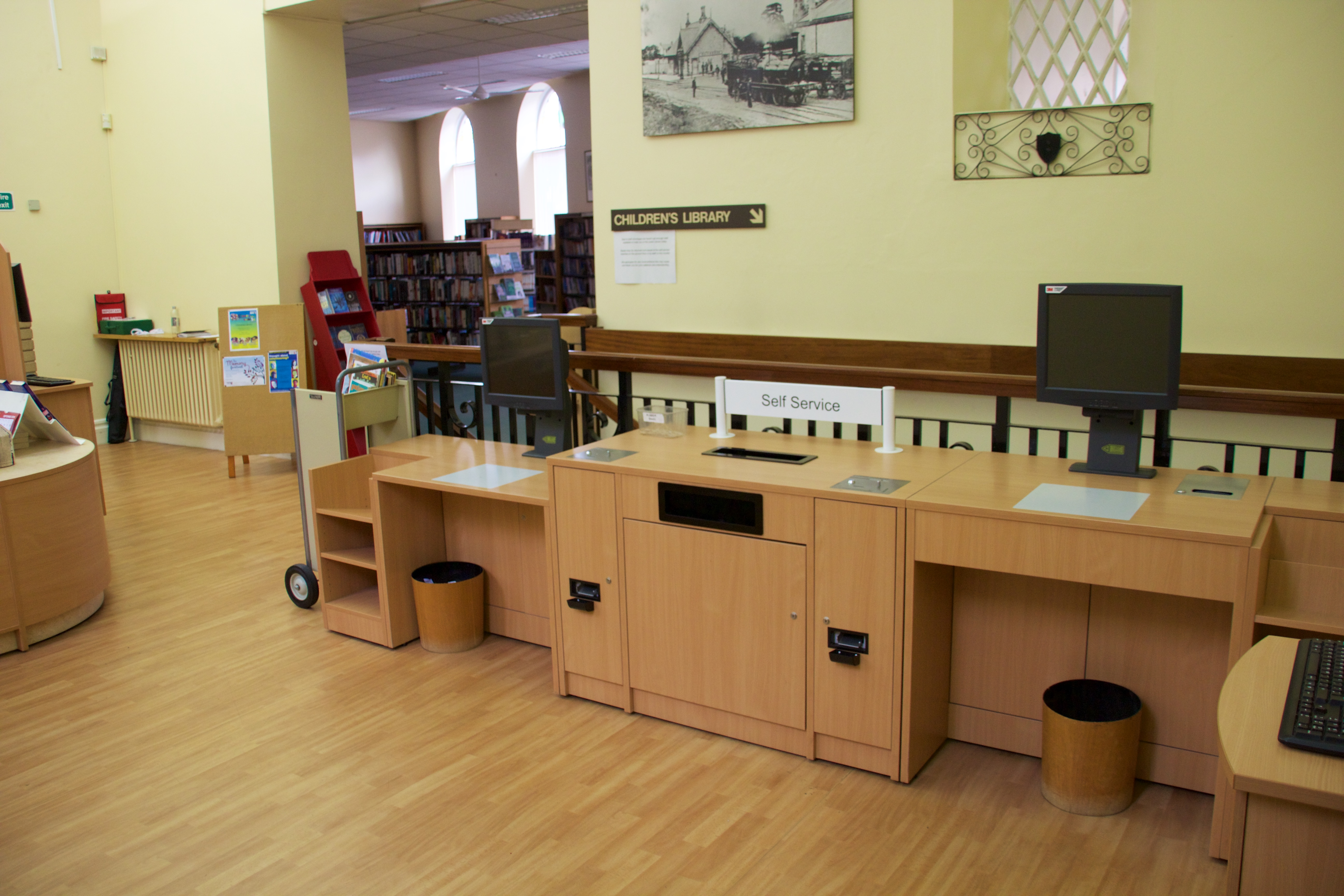
The interior of the library

== See also ==
- Listed buildings in Clitheroe
