= Listed buildings in Clitheroe =

Clitheroe is a civil parish in Ribble Valley, Lancashire, England. It contains 116 listed buildings that are recorded in the National Heritage List for England. Of these, one is listed at Grade I, the highest of the three grades, one is at Grade II*, the middle grade, and the others are at Grade II, the lowest grade.

Following the Norman Conquest, Clitheroe was of military importance, and the castle was built in the late 11th or early 12th century. The town gained its first charter in 1177. During the next centuries it was a market town and administrative centre, and its major industries were agriculture, quarrying and lime burning. By the 19th century it had become a centre of cotton and calico printing, but that industry declined during the 20th century.

Most of the listed buildings are houses with associated structures and shops. The remains of the castle are listed at Grade I, and St Mary Magdalene's Church is listed at Grade II*. The other listed buildings include another church, schools, public houses, civic buildings, a museum, a library, a bridge, a former pinnacle moved from the Houses of Parliament, the three wells that formerly served the town, a war memorial, and a telephone kiosk.

== Key ==
Grade	Criteria
I	Buildings of exceptional interest, sometimes considered to be internationally important
II*	Particularly important buildings of more than special interest
II	Buildings of national importance and special interest

== Buildings ==
Name and location	Photograph	Date	Notes	Grade
Clitheroe Castle; 53.87084°N 2.39318°W		12th century	The remains of the castle consist of a square Norman keep and a stretch of bailey walls. The keep originally had three floors, but these and the roof are no longer present. There are flat corner turrets, one of which contains a staircase. Buttresses were added to the walls in 1848–50 as part of a repair.	I
Edisford Bridge; 53.86847°N 2.41767°W		Medieval	The bridge carries the B6243 road over the River Ribble. It is in stone and consists of four arches with cutwaters. The main arch is larger and segmental, and the others are pointed.	II
St Mary Magdalene's Church; 53.87422°N 2.39029°W		15th century	The oldest parts of the church are the tower and the east end. The rest of the church was rebuilt in 1828–29 by Rickman and Hutchinson. In 1844 the top part of the tower and the spire were added, and in 1898 the roof and clerestory were built. The church is in gritstone with a slate roof and clay ridge tiles. It consists of a nave with a clerestory, aisles, vestries, a chancel with a south chapel, and a west steeple. The steeple has a four-stage tower with angle buttresses, a southeast stair turret, clock faces, and an embattled parapet with octagonal angle turrets. On the tower is a spire with flying buttresses and lucarnes.	II*
26 Castle Street; 53.87199°N 2.39170°W		17th century (probable)	A rendered shop with a slate roof. There are two storeys. In the ground floor is a shop front with pilasters, and in the upper floor is one window on the front and another on the right return.	II
Ashgrove and Shaw Cottage; 53.87081°N 2.38568°W		17th century	A pair of rendered houses in two storeys with a gabled wing projecting forward. Most of the windows date from the 17th and the 18th centuries, and have dripstones. There is also a 19th-century glazed porch.	II
Horrocksford Hall Barn; 53.89082°N 2.38445°W	—	17th century (probable)	A stone barn with a stone-slate roof, it contains a tall cart entrance and ventilation slits. In the gable end is a dovecote.	II
The Old Bothy; 53.85877°N 2.38202°W	—	17th century	The building was extended to the left in the 18th century. It is in stone and has two storeys. The older part has a 17th-century six-light window, and in the later part are two Venetian windows, one in each floor.	II
Pimlico Farmhouse and farm building 53.88403°N 2.38500°W	—	1715	The farmhouse is pebbledashed and in two storeys. The central doorway has a moulded surround, and a dripstone shaped to form a panel that contains an inscription. This is flanked on the ground floor by three-light mullioned and transomed windows. To the right is another doorway with a loading door above, and to the right of that is a stone barn with an arched cart entry.	II
39 and 41 Lowergate; 53.87161°N 2.39029°W	—	Early 18th century	Two stone buildings with a slate roof, in two storeys. No. 39 has irregular windows with stone lintels, and No. 41 has two three-light sash windows in each floor, and a window in a blocked carriage entry.	II
Siddows Farmhouse; 53.85957°N 2.41851°W	—	Early 18th century	The farmhouse is in stone with two storeys and two bays. The doorway has a plain surround and a chamfered lintel, above which is an inscribed panel. There are dripstones above the door and windows.	II
4–12 Castle Street; 53.87171°N 2.39194°W	—	18th century	A row of five rendered shops in three storeys, with a moulded eaves cornice. Each shop has two bays, and the windows are sashes. Some of the shops fronts on the ground floor are modern, while others date from the 19th century.	II
9 Castle Street; 53.87166°N 2.39229°W	—	18th century	A rendered shop in two storeys. It has a modern shop front in the ground floor, and two windows with stone surrounds above.	II
11 Castle Street; 53.87191°N 2.39213°W		18th century	A shop with a rendered gable end facing the road, and with stone on the side. It has two storeys and rusticated quoins. In the ground floor is a 19th-century shop front, and above it is a window with a plain surround.	II
13–19 Castle Street; 53.87173°N 2.39222°W	—	18th century	On the left is a rendered shop with rusticated quoins in three storeys and a gable facing the road. There is a modern shop front in the ground floor and sash windows above. To the right is a two-storey rendered shop with a Welsh slate roof.	II
16 Castle Street; 53.87179°N 2.39188°W	—	18th century	A rendered shop in two storeys. In the ground floor is a modern shop front, and above are two sash windows with plain surrounds.	II
18 and 20 Castle Street; 53.87181°N 2.39184°W	—	18th century	A rendered shop in two storeys. In the ground floor is a late 19th-century shop front with arcaded windows, and above are two sash windows.	II
4 Church Street and Church Court; 53.87328°N 2.39046°W		18th century	A rendered house with a slate roof, in three storeys and three bays. The windows in the top floor are fixed, and those in the middle floor are casements. In the ground floor is a carriage entry, a window, and a doorway with a fanlight.	II
6 and 8 Church Street; 53.87339°N 2.39038°W		18th century	The building is in stone with a Welsh slate roof, in two storeys and three bays. The windows have plain surrounds. On the left of the ground floor is a shop front, and to the right is a doorway with a fanlight and a cornice, and a window.	II
12 Church Street; 53.87359°N 2.39026°W	—	18th century	A stuccoed house with two storeys and three bays on a plinth. The doorway has an open pediment and a semicircular fanlight, and the windows have plain surrounds. In the roof are three two-light gabled dormers.	II
15 Church Street; 53.87348°N 2.39074°W		18th century	The house is in limestone, and has two storeys and three bays. The windows have plain stone surrounds. The central doorway is flanked by engaged Tuscan columns, and has a semicircular fanlight and a pediment.	II
21 Church Street; 53.87379°N 2.39044°W		18th century	The house is roughcast with two storeys and asymmetrical three-bay front. The central doorway has engaged Ionic columns, a frieze, and a cornice, and the windows have moulded architraves. Above the central bay is a pediment with a decorated and inscribed plaque in the tympanum. On the corners are urn finials.	II
22 Church Street; 53.87384°N 2.39010°W		18th century	A pebbledashed house in two storeys and one bay, with sash windows. There is a three-light window in the upper floor, and a single-light window to the right of a doorway in the ground floor.	II
2 and 4 Duck Street; 53.87216°N 2.38843°W		18th century	A pair of buildings in stone with rusticated quoins and a slate roof. They are in two storeys, and the windows have plain stone surrounds. No. 2 has a modern shop front in the ground floor, and the doorway to No. 4 has pilasters and a pediment.	II
14 and 16 Duck Street; 53.87234°N 2.38810°W	—	18th century (probable)	The building is in roughcast stone on a rendered plinth, and includes a former coach house. It has two storeys and rusticated quoins; its gable end faces the road. Some windows are sashes, and others are modern.	II
33 and 35 Lowergate; 53.87186°N 2.38966°W	—	18th century	A pair of pebbledashed cottages with rusticated quoins and a rendered plinth. They have two storeys, with two windows in each floor, and eaves modillions. The windows and doorways have plain surrounds.	II
32–36 Moor Lane; 53.87030°N 2.39212°W	—	18th century	The buildings have two storeys. The building to the north has a 19th-century shop front with six arcaded windows in the upper floor. The other buildings are rendered with sash windows in the upper floor. In the lower floor are two windows, a modern shop front, and a doorway with a plain surround.	II
1 and 3 Parson Lane; 53.87159°N 2.39381°W	—	18th century	A pair of rendered buildings on a plinth with a stone-slate roof. They are in two storeys with a lean-to extension on the left. In the upper floor are three windows. The ground floor of No. 1 contains a window and a doorway, and No. 3 has a 19th-century shop front and a doorway. To the right is a passage entry.	II
2 Shaw Bridge Street; 53.87202°N 2.38869°W		18th century	A pebbledashed shop with a main part in three storeys and two bays, with a 19th-century shop front in the ground floor. To the left is a two-storey part, the right bay having a canted shop window, above which is a canted bay window with an iron finial. The left bay has a carriage entrance with a window above.	II
4 Shaw Bridge Street; 53.87193°N 2.38854°W	—	18th century	A rendered house with flanking stone pilasters on a stone plinth. It has two storeys and two bays. The windows and doorway have moulded surrounds, and above the door is a fanlight and a hood.	II
8 and 10 Shaw Bridge Street; 53.87171°N 2.38815°W	—	18th century	A pair of pebbledashed stone houses with a rendered plinth. They have a double-span roof with gables facing the road. The doors and windows have plain stone surrounds.	II
11–15 Shaw Bridge Street; 53.87188°N 2.38802°W		18th century	A row of three pebbledashed houses in two storeys. No. 11 has a doorway, a passage entry, and a window in the lower floor, and two windows above. No. 13 has one window in each floor and a doorway. No. 15 has a symmetrical front with two windows on each floor, and a central doorway with a moulded architrave, a cornice and a rectangular fanlight.	II
29–33 Wellgate; 53.87260°N 2.38956°W	—	18th century	Three rendered houses. No. 31 has three storeys and three bays, No. 33 to the right is lower with three storeys and two bays, and No. 29 has two storeys and two bays. Nos. 29 and 31 each have a doorway with a semicircular fanlight and a pediment; No. 33 has a small passage door and a doorway with a cornice.	II
2–6 York Street; 53.87330°N 2.38951°W	—	18th century	A row of three stuccoed houses with a slate roof and a modillioned eaves cornice. In the ground floor of Nos. 2 and 4 are modern shop windows. The doorway of No. 6 has moulded pilasters, a frieze, a cornice, and a rectangular fanlight.	II
11–23 York Street; 53.87377°N 2.38898°W	—	18th century	A row of seven rendered houses in three storeys with a modillioned eaves cornice and rusticated quoins. Most of the windows are sashes, and the doors have rectangular fanlights.	II
Clitheroe Royal Grammar School (old building); 53.87406°N 2.38861°W		18th century	The building is in stone and has two storeys and five bays. It has a modillioned eaves cornice, and rusticated quoins. The central doorway has a pediment and a rectangular fanlight.	II
Crown Inn Chambers and Nos. 3–7 Waddington Road; 53.87494°N 2.39001°W	—	18th century	A former public house and three houses. The former public house is rendered, in two storeys, with rusticated quoins, and a round-headed doorway with a keystone and impost bands. The houses are in stone. Nos. 3 and 5 have three storeys and sash windows. No. 7 has two storeys, and a modern door with a passage entry to the right.	II
Dog and Partridge public house 53.87240°N 2.38892°W		18th century	The public house is pebbledashed with quoins and a Welsh slate roof, and is in two storeys. There are two doorways, one with carved spandrels and a moulded cornice, and the other, smaller doorway with pilasters, a cornice, and a rectangular fanlight. (Note: Street View in May 2011 shows it to be named "The Dog".)	II
Roefield; 53.86857°N 2.41638°W	—	18th century	A stone house with rusticated quoins. It has two storeys, and consists of a main range and a projecting wing to the right. In the centre of the main range is a single-storey porch with panelled piers. To its left is a single-storey bay window, and above it is a round-headed window. The wing has a two-storey bay window with a parapet.	II
Former stable, Roefield; 53.86847°N 2.41552°W	—	18th century	The former stable is in stone with rusticated quoins, a modillion cornice, and a stone-slate roof. In the centre is a carriage entry with a rusticated surround, and there are two round pitching holes.	II
Stanley House; 53.87163°N 2.38986°W	—	18th century	A pebbledashed house with two storeys and an attic, and a symmetrical gabled three-bay front. The central doorway has rusticated long-and-short jambs, a semicircular head with voussoirs, and a fanlight. To the right is a 19th-century two-storey gabled extension. Most of the windows are sashes.	II
Swan and Royal Hotel; 53.87213°N 2.39154°W		18th century	A stuccoed public house with three storeys and three bays. There are three three-light mullioned windows in each floor. The doorway is round-headed with panelled jambs, an archivolt, imposts, and a semicircular fanlight. Above the door is a wrought iron inn sign with grapes and vine leaves.	II
Vicarage; 53.87356°N 2.39057°W	—	18th century	A stone house in two storeys, with four windows in the upper storeys and two in the ground floor. Between the ground floor windows is a doorway with a moulded architrave and a cornice, and to the left is a carriage entrance with a segmental head. In the roof are two 19th-century dormers.	II
23 Church Street; 53.87385°N 2.39065°W	—	1757	A house forming a rear wing to No. 21 Church Street. It is rendered in two storeys, and with sash windows. There are three windows in the upper floor, and a four-light window in the ground floor. Also in the ground floor is a re-used moulded 17th-century doorway with a cornice and chamfered jambs.	II
32–36 Parson Lane; 53.87173°N 2.39402°W	—	Late 18th century	A row of three stone houses with three storeys and one bay each. No. 36 is rendered with a Welsh slate roof. Nos. 34 and 36 have rusticated quoins and doorways with rectangular fanlights.	II
St Michael's Primary School; 53.87128°N 2.39059°W	—	1799	Originated as a Roman Catholic church, later used as a school. It is in stone and has a single storey. The main part has three round-headed windows with imposts and keystones, and contain Gothick tracery. To the left is a projecting part with four sash windows. At the rear is an extension of 1870.	II
1 Church Street; 53.87310°N 2.39096°W		Late 18th century or early 19th century	A rendered shop in three storeys and three bays. In the ground floor is a modern shop front, with an arched carriage entry to the left. The windows have stone surrounds.	II
19 Church Street; 53.87369°N 2.39056°W		Late 18th century or early 19th century	A stone house with two storeys and a symmetrical three-bay front. The central doorway has pilasters and a pediment, and the windows are sashes with moulded surrounds.	II
24 Church Street; 53.87390°N 2.39007°W		Late 18th century or early 19th century	The house is in limestone with a Welsh slate roof, and has two storeys and three bays. Around the windows are plain surrounds. The central doorway has a moulded cornice and architrave, and a rectangular fanlight.	II
6–12 Duck Street; 53.87225°N 2.38826°W		Late 18th century or early 19th century	A row of four stone houses on a rendered plinth with rusticated quoins to the left, and a stone-slate roof. Each house has one window in each floor, and a doorway, all with plain stone surrounds.	II
30 and 32 Duck Street; 53.87245°N 2.38783°W		Late 18th century or early 19th century	A pair of stone houses with a Welsh slate roof, in two storeys. Each house has a central doorway and two sash windows in each floor, all with plain surrounds.	II
1–9 Little Moor; 53.86320°N 2.39221°W	—	18th century or early 19th century	A row of five roughcast houses with two storeys and sash windows. Nos. 1 and 3 have doorways with pilasters, cornices, and rectangular fanlights. No. 5 has a round-headed fanlight, imposts, and a keystone.	II
11–15 Little Moor; 53.86282°N 2.39253°W	—	18th century or early 19th century	A group of three rendered cottages in two storeys. Each house has two windows in the upper floor. No. 13 has a semicircular fanlight above the door.	II
23, 25 and 27 (part) Lowergate; 53.87202°N 2.38933°W	—	18th century or early 19th century	A pair of houses and an entry to the right. The houses are pebbledashed on a rendered plinth, and have two storeys. They each have a sash window on each floor and a doorway, all with plain surrounds. The part of No. 27 is recessed and contains an opening with a window above.	II
5 Shaw Bridge Street; 53.87208°N 2.38827°W	—	18th century or early 19th century	The building is rendered and in two storeys. There are five windows in the upper floor, and three windows and two doorways in the lower floor, all of which are round-headed with keystones, impost blocks, and modern glazing.	II
7 and 9 Shaw Bridge Street; 53.87198°N 2.38816°W	—	18th century or early 19th century	A pair of stone houses with rusticated quoins. There are three storeys, with paired doorways in the centre, and two windows in each floor, all of which have plain stone surrounds.	II
8 and 10 York Street; 53.87331°N 2.38948°W	—	18th century or early 19th century	A pair of pebbledashed shops with a moulded eaves cornice and rusticated quoins. In the ground floor are modern shop fronts with a passage entry between them.	II
12–16 York Street; 53.87344°N 2.38921°W	—	18th century or early 19th century	A row of three pebbledashed houses with a modillioned eaves cornice and rusticated quoins. The windows are sashes. No 14 has a modern shop front, No 16 has a doorway with a round head, and No 12 has a doorway with pilasters, a pediment, and a semicircular fanlight with cast iron tracery.	II
18 York Street; 53.87346°N 2.38911°W	—	18th century or early 19th century	A rendered building with rusticated quoins on the left. It has three storeys with one window in each of the upper storeys. In the ground floor is a small shop window with a cornice, and a doorway with pilasters and a cornice.	II
34–38 York Street; 53.87371°N 2.38856°W	—	18th century or early 19th century	Three stuccoed houses with rusticated quoins in three storeys. Each doorway has a stone architrave, a fanlight, and a cornice. There is a modern shop window in the ground floor of No. 38.	II
Bellman Farmhouse; 53.88526°N 2.36595°W	—	18th century or early 19th century	The farmhouse has been converted for domestic use. It is rendered and has two storeys. There are two doorways and four windows. To the right is an extension with one window in each floor, and to the left is a barn.	II
Little Moor House; 53.86292°N 2.39293°W	—	18th century or early 19th century	A stuccoed house in two storeys. It contains a two-storey bow window with a canopy in the ground floor, a doorway with a semicircular head and a pediment, and a French window.	II
New Inn; 53.87182°N 2.39354°W		18th century or early 19th century	The public house is rendered with a Welsh slate roof. It has two storeys and a symmetrical three-bay front, with an eaves cornice and rusticated quoins. The central doorway has a rectangular fanlight and a moulded cornice, and the windows are sashes.	II
The Alleys; 53.87531°N 2.38985°W	—	18th century or early 19th century	A stone house with a slate roof in two storeys and with a symmetrical three-bay front. It has a modillion eaves cornice and rusticated quoins. The central doorway has pilasters, a pediment, and a semicircular fanlight, and the windows are sashes.	II
Primrose House; 53.86179°N 2.40156°W		c. 1811	A stuccoed house for the owner of Primrose Mill, in two storeys. The doorway has a round-headed fanlight, and the sash windows are arranged irregularly. On the front is a full-height bow window. To the right is a single-storey wing consisting of a bow window, and to the left is another single-storey extension.	II
Town Hall; 53.87309°N 2.39061°W		1820–22	The town hall, later incorporated into the library, was designed by Thomas Rickman. It is in stone and has two storeys, a moulded cornice and a parapet. Between the storeys is a string course, below which are five armorial shields. The windows are lancets that have drip moulds with leaf-stops. The doorway has an arched head and is flanked by colonnettes. On the roof is an octagonal bellcote with a weathervane.	II
Holmes Mill; 53.86782°N 2.39489°W		c. 1823	A textile mill, extended in about 1830, with weaving sheds added in 1853 and a boiler and engine house in 1910. It is built mainly in limestone with sandstone dressings and a slate roof. The original block has 15 bays and a four-storey warehouse block, and the extension has 14 bays. The boiler house and engine house are in a single storey.	II
27 and 29 Castle Street; 53.87209°N 2.39198°W	—	Early 19th century	A rendered shop in three storeys with a moulded eaves cornice. In the ground floor is modern shop front, and above some of the windows are sashes and others are casements.	II
31 and 33 Castle Street; 53.87218°N 2.39191°W		Early 19th century	A pair of rendered shops in three storeys. Between the shops is an entry with a rusticated round-arched head. There are late 19th-century shop fronts in the ground floor, and above some windows are sashes and others are modern.	II
3–13 Duck Street; 53.87228°N 2.38855°W		Early 19th century	A row of six pebbledashed houses with slate roofs in two storeys. Each house has a window in each floor, and a doorway, all with plain surrounds. Between Nos. 9 and 11 is a passage doorway.	II
26 and 28 Duck Street; 53.87238°N 2.38795°W	—	Early 19th century	The building is in stone with a gable end facing the street, and has two storeys. In the ground floor is a doorway with a fanlight and a cornice, and a large and a small window, with two windows in the upper floor. On the right side are blocked windows and door, and there is a later rear wing.	II
3, 5 and 5A Market Place; 53.87268°N 2.39122°W	—	Early 19th century	Rendered shops with a slate roof in three storeys. No. 3 has a 19th-century shop front with Ionic pilasters. To the right is a passage entry and a modern shop front. In the upper floors are windows with plain stone surrounds.	II
1 and 3 Moor Lane; 53.87102°N 2.39164°W		Early 19th century	A pair of rendered shops with rusticated quoins and a slate roof in two storeys. There is a modern shop front in the ground floor of each building, and two windows in the upper storey.	II
46 Moor Lane; 53.86905°N 2.39287°W		Early 19th century	A rendered house with a slate roof in two storeys. There is one sash window in each floor and a doorway to the right, all with stone surrounds.	II
48–52 Moor Lane; 53.86899°N 2.39291°W		Early 19th century	A row of three rendered buildings in two storeys with a Welsh slate roof. Each building has one window with a stone surround in the upper floor. Nos. 48 and 50 have modern shop fronts in the ground floor, and No. 52 has a doorway and window.	II
16 Parson Lane; 53.87171°N 2.39318°W	—	Early 19th century	The house is rendered with three storeys. There is one window in each floor with a stone surround, and the doorway has a rectangular fanlight and a cornice.	II
18 and 20 Parson Lane; 53.87175°N 2.39328°W		Early 19th century	A pair of rendered buildings with rusticated quoins on the left. They have three storeys; No. 18 has one bay and a shop front with pilasters and a cornice, and No. 20 has two bays and a doorway with a stone surround, a cornice, and a rectangular fanlight.	II
28 and 30 Parson Lane; 53.87170°N 2.39378°W	—	Early 19th century	A rendered shop with rusticated quoins and a Welsh slate roof. It has two storeys, and there are two bays on Parson Lane and four on New Market Street. In the ground floor is a modern shop front, and the windows in the upper floor have plain surrounds.	II
6 Shaw Bridge Street; 53.87190°N 2.38844°W	—	Early 19th century	A stone warehouse with four storeys and two bays. In the ground floor are a carriage entry, a doorway, and a window, and there are two windows in each of the upper floors. All the openings have plain stone surrounds. (Note: Street View in April 2009 shows that the warehouse has been converted for domestic use.)	II
7 and 9 Wellgate, 1 Duck Street; 53.87218°N 2.38877°W		Early 19th century	Three pebbledashed houses on a corner site, in three storeys and with three bays on each front. On Wallgate is a modern shop front. The windows and doorways have plain stone surrounds. The centre windows in the middle and top floors on Wallgate are blank.	II
78–88 Whalley Road; 53.86613°N 2.39440°W	—	Early 19th century	A row of six rendered houses with roofs in slate and stone-slate. They have three storeys and a modillioned eaves cornice.	II
90–110 Whalley Road; 53.86594°N 2.39452°W	—	Early 19th century	A terrace of buildings, mainly houses, rendered, and with three storeys. Most of the doorways have round heads, keystones, impost blocks, and fanlights. The doorway to No. 102 has plain pilasters, a cornice and an entablature.	II
Premises occupied by Tourist Information Office; 53.87329°N 2.39045°W	—	Early 19th century	The building is rendered with a slate roof, and has stone quoins flanking the windows and doorway. There are two storeys and four bays, with sash windows in the upper floor. In the ground floor is a doorway with a fanlight, a window with a segmental arch above which is decorative stonework, a two-light window with a blank panel above, and a window with a square head.	II
White Lion Hotel; 53.87286°N 2.39111°W		Early 19th century	The public house is rendered in two storeys with attics. The central doorway has a four-centred head, and is flanked by a bay on each side with a gable and finials. These bays contain mullioned windows with two lights in the gable and three lights in the lower storeys. To the right of these is a two-storey canted bay window.	II
Salford and Wheatsheaf Hotel; 53.86705°N 2.39326°W	—	c. 1825	The building is partly rendered with a Welsh slate roof and has two storeys. To the left is a range with three windows in each floor. To the right is a gabled wing, with four bays that include windows and a carriage entry.	II
Henthorn Farmhouse; 53.86392°N 2.40887°W	—	1835	The house is rendered with a Welsh slate roof, and is in two storeys. The windows are modern with stone surrounds, and in the ground floor is a carriage entry.	II
17 Moor Lane; 53.87054°N 2.39171°W		Early to mid 19th century	A rendered shop with a Welsh slate roof, in two storeys. It has a 19th-century shop front with carved pilasters, an entablature, and a cornice. In the upper floor are five windows, the outer ones with round heads, and the central window with a rectangular head and foliated spandrels. The ground floor has a central entrance, the flanking windows having decorated surrounds similar to the central window above.	II
56–60 Moor Lane; 53.86876°N 2.39326°W		Early to mid 19th century	Three rendered buildings with rendered rusticated quoins and a slate roof. They have three storeys, and there is a later extension to the left. The doors to Nos. 56 and 58 have fanlights.	II
3–9 Railway View Avenue; 53.87448°N 2.39281°W	—	Early to mid 19th century	A row of four pebbledashed houses on a stone plinth with rusticated quoins and a slate roof. The windows are sashes, with nine in the upper floor and five on the ground floor, and the doorways have cornices.	II
11 and 13 Railway View Avenue; 53.87441°N 2.39314°W	—	Early to mid 19th century	A pair of rendered houses with rusticated quoins on the left, and a slate roof. Each house has a doorway with a stone surround and a wooden hood, and there is one sash window in each floor.	II
Brown Cow Public House; 53.86922°N 2.39274°W		Early to mid 19th century	The public house is rendered, it stands on a junction, and has two storeys. The windows have stone lintels, and the doorway on the corner is modern.	II
Commercial Hotel; 53.86641°N 2.39422°W	—	Early to mid 19th century	The hotel is in roughcast stone with a stone-slate roof, in three storeys and three bays. The central doorway has a rusticated surround, a moulded cornice, and a rectangular fanlight. At the rear is a two-storey stable block.	II
Council premises 53.87017°N 2.39311°W		Early to mid 19th century	The building is in the grounds of Clitheroe Castle. It is built in stone, in Gothic style, and has three storeys and a crenellated parapet. In the left part is a square turret, and in the right part is a porch in Jacobean style with ball finials and a round-headed entry. Most of the windows have round heads, and some have mullions. The building has been converted for use as a museum.	II
Victoria Hotel; 53.87259°N 2.39136°W		Early to mid 19th century	A rendered public house with rusticated quoins, an eaves cornice, and a gable end with carved bargeboards. It has three storeys and a front of three bays. The windows have plain stone surrounds, and the central doorway has pilasters, an entablature, a cornice, and a rectangular fanlight.	II
3 and 5 Church Street; 53.87298°N 2.39099°W	—	1836	A rendered shop with two storeys and three bays. In the ground floor is a carriage entry with a segmental head to the left, and a modern shop window to the right. Most of the windows in the upper floors are sashes.	II
Rose and Crown Hotel; 53.87198°N 2.39213°W		1836	A public house in Elizabethan style. It has three storeys and three bays. The central bay has a stepped gable with a finial, and in the ground floor is a canted bay window. The windows in the middle floor are mullioned and transomed. The left bay in the ground floor contains a carriage entry with a four-centred head.	II
Stanworth House; 53.87404°N 2.38912°W	—	1837	A pebbledashed house in Gothic style with a slate roof. It has two storeys and mullioned windows. The porch has columns, a parapet and a cornice, and there is a polygonal bay window with a parapet and finials.	II
The National Buildings; 53.86969°N 2.39253°W		1839	This was built as the National School, and has since been converted for other uses. It is rendered with rusticated quoins and has a Welsh slate roof. The building is in two storeys and seven bays, there is a single-storey extension to the right. The central bay projects forward and is gabled with finials. It contains a doorway with a Tudor arched head, and in the gable is a circular plaque. The windows have stone surrounds and dripstones.	II
St James' Church; 53.86581°N 2.39217°W		1839–42	The church is in stone, with a partly rendered west end, and a slate roof. It is in Norman style, and consists of a nave, a short chancel with vestries, and a west tower flanked by porches. The tower has three stages and has a west doorway, above which is a two-light window, and a clock face. At the top is an arcaded parapet and large square corner pinnacles. All the windows and the doorway have round heads.	II
Turret from the Houses of Parliament; 53.86966°N 2.39336°W		1840–54	Originating as a pinnacle for the Houses of Parliament, and designed by Charles Barry, it was moved to its present site in 1937. It consists of an octagonal stone turret with lion supporters. Standing on a plinth, it has lancet openings, gargoyles, and crocketed finials.	II
St Michael and St John Church and presbytery 53.87079°N 2.39085°W		1847–50	A Roman Catholic church designed by Joseph Hansom in Early English style, the Lady Chapel was added in 1884, and the interior was enriched in 1899 by Edmund Kirby. The church is in limestone with sandstone dressings and slate roofs. It consists of a nave with a clerestory and a west baptistry, north and south aisles, a sanctuary with an apse and a south Lady Chapel. To the north a sacristy links to the presbytery. The west end is flanked by a pair of square towers; each of which has a recess for a statue and a small lancet window, and it rises to an octagonal belfry with an octagonal conical spire. The presbytery has two storeys, a turret at the front, and a small square tower at the rear.	II
1 and 3 Castle Gate; 53.87144°N 2.39208°W	—	Mid-19th century	The buildings are in stone, and have pilasters at the ends and between the buildings. There are three storeys, with two bays in No. 1, and three in No. 3. The windows are sashes. In the ground floor are a 19th-century shop front, a modern shop front, and a doorway with an architrave and a fanlight.	II
2 Castle Street; 53.87155°N 2.39215°W		Mid-19th century	A stone shop with three storeys and two bays, with double rusticated end pilasters. In the ground floor is a modern shop front. Above are two sash windows in each floor, and a moulded eaves cornice.	II
4–8 Church Brow; 53.87419°N 2.38993°W	—	Mid-19th century	A row of three stone houses in two storeys with attics. There are two gables with carved bargeboards, and the windows have plain surrounds. There are three doorways, each with a fanlight, foliated spandrelss, and a rectangular drip mould that has terminals carved with human heads.	II
10 Church Street; 53.87347°N 2.39031°W		Mid-19th century	A rendered house with rusticated quoins and a slate roof. It has two storeys and a symmetrical three-bay front. The doorway has pilasters and a moulded cornice, and the windows have plain surrounds.	II
9 Market Place; 53.87280°N 2.39111°W		Mid-19th century	A rendered shop with three storeys and two bays. It has a moulded eaves cornice, and in the upper floors are modern windows with plain stone surrounds. The ground floor contains a 19th-century shop front.	II
Mytton House and 13 Church Street; 53.87336°N 2.39069°W	—	19th century	A pair of pebbledashed houses with a slate roof in two storeys. Mytton House has a symmetrical front of three bays. The central doorway has a pointed head and fanlight. No. 13 to the right has two bays and paired central entrances with segmental pediments. All the windows are sashes.	II
Outbuilding and stable block 53.87058°N 2.39326°W		Mid-19th century	The buildings at Clitheroe Castle are in stone with a Welsh slate roof, and in Gothic style. The outbuilding has two storeys, mullioned and transomed windows, a crenellated parapet, and a square turret. The stables are in one storey and have carriage entries, windows with pointed heads, and round pitching holes.	II
2 Church Brow; 53.87402°N 2.39001°W	—	Mid to late 19th century	A stone building with rusticated quoins in two storeys and three bays. The windows have plain surrounds; those in the lower floor have two lights and cornices. The central doorway is flanked by pink granite columns with carved capitals, and it has a decorated, pointed arch and a fanlight.	II
Barclays Bank; 53.87245°N 2.39151°W		1870–71	The bank is in stone and in Italian Gothic style with two storeys. The doorway has collonettes and is arched with trefoils in the spandrels. The parapet is pierced with quatrefoils.	II
Grand Cinema; 53.87352°N 2.38880°W		1873–74	Originally built as the Clitheroe Public Hall, it was converted into a cinema in 1921, and converted again in 2007–08 into a performing arts centre. The building is in stone with a slate roof. The entrance front has a central gable under which is a doorway with engaged columns under a moulded Gothic arch and flanked by casement windows.	II
Andrew Carnegie Public Library; 53.87296°N 2.39072°W		1904–05	The library is sited on the fork of two roads. It is in stone with a slate roof, and has a basement, two storeys and an attic. The corner is rounded, and rises to become polygonal with a conical roof surmounted by a ventilator turret. It contains a clock face under a gable and two round windows. The ground floor windows along the sides have arched heads, and the other windows are rectangular. Above the doorway is a three-light fanlight.	II
War memorial 53.87053°N 2.39266°W		1923	The war memorial stands in the grounds of Clitheroe Castle, and consists of a bronze statue of a Grenadier Guard in battle dress holding a rifle and with his head bowed. The rest of the memorial is in white granite on a square pedestal with a square plinth on a three-stepped square base. On the pedestal are plaques with inscriptions and the names of those lost in both World Wars. Behind the main statue is a relocated memorial to those lost in the Boer War.	II
Telephone kiosk 53.87253°N 2.39107°W	—	1935	A K6 type telephone kiosk, designed by Giles Gilbert Scott. Constructed in cast iron with a square plan and a dome, it has three unperforated crowns in the top panels.	II
Saint Mary's Well; 53.87501°N 2.38909°W		Undated	One of the three wells serving the town. It consists of a rectangular stone pool with a flagged floor that is divided into two unequal sections by a stone gangway.	II
Stocks Wells; 53.87079°N 2.39561°W	—	Undated	One of the three wells serving the town. It is surrounded by a rectangular wall and is flagged.	II
The Towns Well; 53.87233°N 2.38894°W		Undated	One of the three wells serving the town. Three steps lead down to a rectangular pool that is flagged and walled.	II

== Notes and references ==
=== Sources ===
- Hartwell, Clare; Pevsner, Nikolaus (2009) [1969], Lancashire: North, The Buildings of England, New Haven and London: Yale University Press, ISBN 978-0-300-12667-9
- Historic England, "Clitheroe Castle (1071553)", National Heritage List for England
- Historic England, "Edisford Bridge, Clitheroe (1072383)", National Heritage List for England
- Historic England, "Parish Church of St Mary Magdalene, Clitheroe (1362179)", National Heritage List for England
- Historic England, "No. 26 Castle Street, Clitheroe (1362211)", National Heritage List for England
- Historic England, "Ashgrove Shaw Cottage, Clitheroe (1164286)", National Heritage List for England
- Historic England, "Horrocksford Hall Barn, Clitheroe (1072322)", National Heritage List for England
- Historic England, "The Old Bothy, Clitheroe (1072386)", National Heritage List for England
- Historic England, "Pimlico Farmhouse and attached farm building, Clitheroe (1317888)", National Heritage List for England
- Historic England, "Nos. 39 and 41 Lowergate, Clitheroe (1362201)", National Heritage List for England
- Historic England, "Siddows Farmhouse, Clitheroe (1163894)", National Heritage List for England
- Historic England, "Nos. 4 to 12 Castle Street, Clitheroe (1072366)", National Heritage List for England
- Historic England, "No. 9 Castle Street, Clitheroe (1072369)", National Heritage List for England
- Historic England, "No. 11 Castle Street, Clitheroe (1362212)", National Heritage List for England
- Historic England, "Nos. 13 to 19 Castle Street, Clitheroe (1072370)", National Heritage List for England
- Historic England, "No. 16 Castle Street, Clitheroe (1362210)", National Heritage List for England
- Historic England, "Nos. 18 and 20 Castle Street, Clitheroe (1072367)", National Heritage List for England
- Historic England, "No. 4 Church Street and Church Court, Clitheroe (1362176)", National Heritage List for England
- Historic England, "Nos. 6 and 8 Church Street, Clitheroe (1163668)", National Heritage List for England
- Historic England, "No. 12 Church Street, Clitheroe (1072376)", National Heritage List for England
- Historic England, "No. 15 Church Street, Clitheroe (1362178)", National Heritage List for England
- Historic England, "No. 21 Church Street, Clitheroe (1072379)", National Heritage List for England
- Historic England, "No. 22 Church Street, Clitheroe (1163695)", National Heritage List for England
- Historic England, "Nos. 2 and 4 Duck Street, Clitheroe (1072380)", National Heritage List for England
- Historic England, "Nos. 14 and 16 Duck Street, Clitheroe (1163844)", National Heritage List for England
- Historic England, "Nos. 33 and 35 Lowergate, Clitheroe (1362200)", National Heritage List for England
- Historic England, "Nos. 32 to 36 Moor Lane, Clitheroe (1362204)", National Heritage List for England
- Historic England, "Nos. 1 and 3 Parson Lane, Clitheroe (1164171)", National Heritage List for England
- Historic England, "No. 2 Shaw Bridge Street, Clitheroe (1072361)", National Heritage List for England
- Historic England, "No. 4 Shaw Bridge Street, Clitheroe (1164307)", National Heritage List for England
- Historic England, "Nos. 8 and 10 Shaw Bridge Street, Clitheroe (1072363)", National Heritage List for England
- Historic England, "Nos. 11 to 15 Shaw Bridge Street, Clitheroe (1072360)", National Heritage List for England
- Historic England, "Nos. 29 to 33 Wellgate, Clitheroe (1072364)", National Heritage List for England
- Historic England, "Nos. 2–6 York Street, Clitheroe (1072327)", National Heritage List for England
- Historic England, "Nos. 11–23 York Street, Clitheroe (1072325)", National Heritage List for England
- Historic England, "Clitheroe Royal Grammar School for Boys Old Building, Clitheroe (1072326)", National Heritage List for England
- Historic England, "Crown Inn Chambers and Nos. 3 to 7 Waddington Road, Clitheroe (1164312)", National Heritage List for England
- Historic England, "Dog and Partridge Public House and No 3 Wellgate, Clitheroe (1072344)", National Heritage List for England
- Historic England, "Roefield, Clitheroe (1072384)", National Heritage List for England
- Historic England, "Former stables to Roefield, Clitheroe (1163883)", National Heritage List for England
- Historic England, "Stanley House, Clitheroe (1072347)", National Heritage List for England
- Historic England, "Swan and Royal Hotel, Clitheroe (1072368)", National Heritage List for England
- Historic England, "The Vicarage, Clitheroe (1318087)", National Heritage List for England
- Historic England, "No. 23 Church Street, Clitheroe (1163807)", National Heritage List for England
- Historic England, "Nos. 32 to 36 Parson Lane, Clitheroe (1164199)", National Heritage List for England
- Historic England, "St Michael's Primary School, Clitheroe (1072348)", National Heritage List for England
- Historic England, "No. 1 Church Street, Clitheroe (1318126)", National Heritage List for England
- Historic England, "No. 19 Church Street, Clitheroe (1072378)", National Heritage List for England
- Historic England, "No. 24 Church Street, Clitheroe (1362177)", National Heritage List for England
- Historic England, "Nos. 6 to 12 Duck Street, Clitheroe (1072381)", National Heritage List for England
- Historic England, "Nos. 30 and 32 Duck Street, Clitheroe (1163859)", National Heritage List for England
- Historic England, "Nos. 1–9 Little Moor, Clitheroe (1072342)", National Heritage List for England
- Historic England, "Nos. 11–15 Little Moor, Clitheroe (1072343)", National Heritage List for England
- Historic England, "Nos. 23 and 25 Lowergate (and part of premises occupied by No. 27 Lowergate), Clitheroe (1072346)", National Heritage List for England
- Historic England, "No. 5 Shaw Bridge Street, Clitheroe (1164248)", National Heritage List for England
- Historic England, "Nos. 7 and 9 Shaw Bridge Street, Clitheroe (1072359)", National Heritage List for England
- Historic England, "Nos. 8 and 10 York Street, Clitheroe (1362231)", National Heritage List for England
- Historic England, "Nos. 12 to 16 York Street, Clitheroe (1072328)", National Heritage List for England
- Historic England, "No. 18 York Street, Clitheroe (1362232)", National Heritage List for England
- Historic England, "Nos. 34 to 38 York Street, Clitheroe (1164450)", National Heritage List for England
- Historic England, "Little Moor House, Clitheroe (1362198)", National Heritage List for England
- Historic England, "Bellman Farmhouse, Clitheroe (1362214)", National Heritage List for England
- Historic England, "New Inn, Clitheroe (1072355)", National Heritage List for England
- Historic England, "The Alleys, Clitheroe (1072356)", National Heritage List for England
- Historic England, "Primrose House, Clitheroe (1072357)", National Heritage List for England
- Historic England, "Town Hall, Clitheroe (1072374)", National Heritage List for England#
- Historic England, "Holmes Mill, Clitheroe (1413649)", National Heritage List for England
- Historic England, "Nos. 27 and 29 Castle Street, Clitheroe (1072371)", National Heritage List for England
- Historic England, "Nos. 31 and 33 Castle Street, Clitheroe (1072372)", National Heritage List for England
- Historic England, "Nos. 3 to 13 Duck Street, Clitheroe (1163820)", National Heritage List for England
- Historic England, "Nos. 26 and 28 Duck Street, Clitheroe (1072382)", National Heritage List for England
- Historic England, "Nos. 3, 5 and 5A Market Place, Clitheroe (1072349)", National Heritage List for England
- Historic England, "Nos. 1 and 3 Moor Lane, Clitheroe (1164099)", National Heritage List for England
- Historic England, "No. 46 Moor Lane, Clitheroe (1072353)", National Heritage List for England
- Historic England, "Nos. 48 to 52 Moor Lane, Clitheroe (1164156)", National Heritage List for England
- Historic England, "No. 16 Parson Lane, Clitheroe (1362206)", National Heritage List for England
- Historic England, "Nos. 18 and 20 Parson Lane, Clitheroe (1164191)", National Heritage List for England
- Historic England, "Nos. 28 and 30 Parson Lane, Clitheroe (1362207)", National Heritage List for England
- Historic England, "No. 6 Shaw Bridge Street, Clitheroe (1072362)", National Heritage List for England
- Historic England, "Nos. 7 and 9 Wallgate, 1 Duck Street, Clitheroe (1072345)", National Heritage List for England
- Historic England, "Nos. 78 to 88 Whalley Road, Clitheroe (1072324)", National Heritage List for England
- Historic England, "Nos. 90 to 110 Whalley Road, Clitheroe (1362229)", National Heritage List for England
- Historic England, "Premises occupied by Tourist Information Office, Clitheroe (1318141)", National Heritage List for England
- Historic England, "White Lion Hotel, Clitheroe (1164091)", National Heritage List for England
- Historic England, "Salford and Wheatsheaf Hotel, Clitheroe (1362228)", National Heritage List for England
- Historic England, "Henthorn Farmhouse, Clitheroe (1072385)", National Heritage List for England
- Historic England, "No. 17 Moor Lane, Clitheroe (1072351)", National Heritage List for England
- Historic England, "Nos. 56 to 60 Moor Lane, Clitheroe (1362205)", National Heritage List for England
- Historic England, "Nos. 3 to 9 Railway View Avenue, Clitheroe (1362208)", National Heritage List for England
- Historic England, "Nos. 11 and 13 Railway View Avenue, Clitheroe (1164238)", National Heritage List for England
- Historic England, "Brown Cow Public House, Clitheroe (1072352)", National Heritage List for England
- Historic England, "The Commercial Hotel (including stable block to rear), Clitheroe (1072323)", National Heritage List for England
- Historic England, "Premises occupied by Ribble Valley Borough Council in grounds of Clitheroe Castle (1071554)", National Heritage List for England
- Historic England, "Victoria Hotel, Clitheroe (1362202)", National Heritage List for England
- Historic England, "Nos. 3 and 5 Church Street, Clitheroe (1072377)", National Heritage List for England
- Historic England, "Starkie Arms Hotel, Clitheroe (1362213)", National Heritage List for England
- Historic England, "Stanworth House, Clitheroe (1362230)", National Heritage List for England
- Historic England, "The National Buildings, Clitheroe (1164120)", National Heritage List for England
- Historic England, "Church of St Jamess, Clitheroe (1072358)", National Heritage List for England
- Historic England, "Turret from Houses of Parliament in gardens of Clitheroe Castle (1071555)", National Heritage List for England
- Historic England, "The Church of St Michael and St John and attached presbytery, Clitheroe (1441744)", National Heritage List for England
- Historic England, "Nos. 1 and 3 Castle Gate, Clitheroe (1362209)", National Heritage List for England
- Historic England, "No. 2 Castle Street, Clitheroe (1072365)", National Heritage List for England
- Historic England, "Nos. 4 to 8 Church Brow, Clitheroe (1163635)", National Heritage List for England
- Historic England, "No. 10 Church Street, Clitheroe (1072375)", National Heritage List for England
- Historic England, "No. 9 Market Place, Clitheroe (1072350)", National Heritage List for England
- Historic England, "Mytton House and No. 13 Church Street, Clitheroe (1072329)", National Heritage List for England
- Historic England, "Outbuilding and stable block to Clitheroe Castle and Premises occupied by Ribble Valley Borough Council, Clitheroe (1362600)", National Heritage List for England
- Historic England, "No. 2 Church Brow, Clitheroe (1072373)", National Heritage List for England
- Historic England, "Premises occupied by Barclays Bank, Clitheroe (1163632)", National Heritage List for England
- Historic England, "The Grand Cinema, Clitheroe (1381005)", National Heritage List for England
- Historic England, "Andrew Carnegie Public Library, Clitheroe (1362175)", National Heritage List for England
- Historic England, "Clitheroe War Memorial (1455468)", National Heritage List for England
- Historic England, "K6 Telephone Kiosk outside premises occupied by Yorkshire Bank, Clitheroe (1362233)", National Heritage List for England
- Historic England, "Saint Mary's Well, Clitheroe (1362227)", National Heritage List for England
- Historic England, "Stocks Wells, Clitheroe (1072354)", National Heritage List for England
- Historic England, "The Towns Well, Clitheroe (1362199)", National Heritage List for England
- Historic England, Listed Buildings
