= Clitheroe Castle =

Medieval castle in Lancashire, England

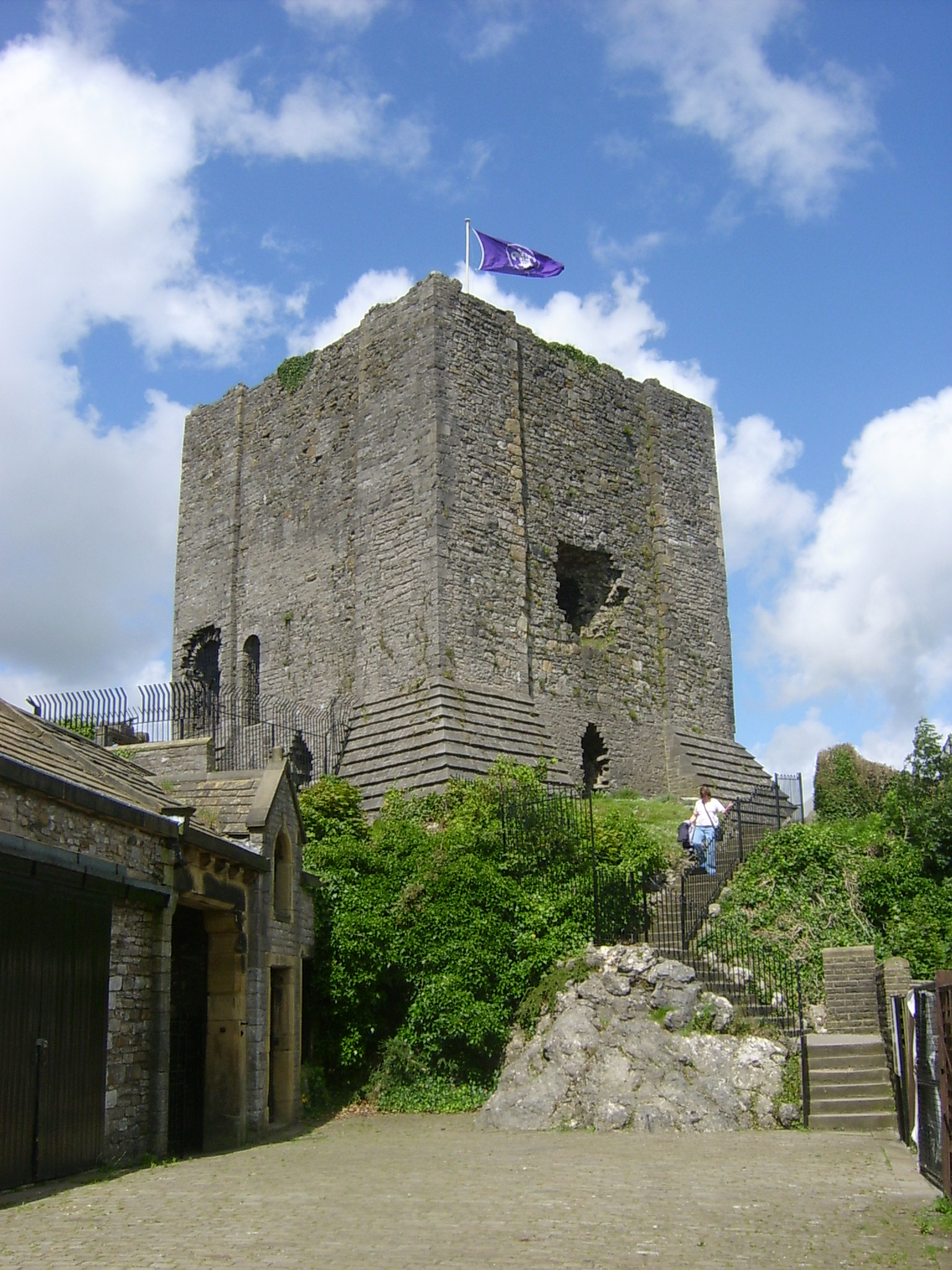
- The keep at Clitheroe Castle, 2007

- Location within the Borough of Ribble Valley
- 53.8709°N 2.3931°W
- Location: Clitheroe, Lancashire, England
- OS grid reference: SD 742416

History
- Built: 12th century
- Built for: de Lacy family

Scheduled monument
- Designated: 10 April 1915
- Reference no.: 1016196

Listed Building – Grade I
- Designated: 19 May 1950
- Reference no.: 1071553

Clitheroe Castle is a ruined early medieval castle in Clitheroe in the Borough of Ribble Valley, Lancashire, England. It was the caput of the Honour of Clitheroe, a vast estate stretching along the western side of the Pennines.

Its earliest history is debated but it is thought to be of Norman origin, probably built in the twelfth century. Property of the de Lacy family, the honour later merged with the earldom and then Duchy of Lancaster. Given to George Monck, 1st Duke of Albemarle in 1660, the castle site remained in private ownership until 1920, when it was sold to the people of Clitheroe to create a war memorial. Today the buildings on the site are the home of Clitheroe Castle Museum.

The keep is the second smallest surviving stone-built keep in England. The castle was listed as a Scheduled Monument on 10 April 1915 (and later, under the Ancient Monuments and Archaeological Areas Act 1979 law). It was Grade I listed on 19 May 1950.

== History ==
=== Background ===
After the Norman Conquest in 1066, the Anglo-Saxon hundred of Blackburnshire was part of a fief given to Roger de Poitou, and the Domesday Book of 1086 shows he had given it to Roger de Busli and Albert de Gresle. Clitheroe is not mentioned by name, and it is assumed that Blackburn had previously been the administrative centre. However some time during the reign of William Rufus, Poitou gave Blackburnshire and the Bowland area, north of the River Ribble (under Craven in the Domesday Book) to the Baron of Pontefract, Robert de Lacy. When de Poitou lost his English holdings in 1102, Henry I not only allowed de Lacy to keep these lands, but added to them with the vills of Chipping, Aighton and Dutton. (Note: Chipping, Aighton and Dutton were surveyed under Amounderness in Domesday, subsequently being added to Blackburnshire.) Clitheroe became the centre of this new honour.

The valley of the River Ribble has formed a significant transport route for a long time. A Roman road runs up it, passing just south of the castle site. The steep limestone outcrop which rises 39 metres (128 ft) above the surrounding land is strategically located to effectively bar the pass, and provides extensive views over the surrounding area.

=== Origin ===
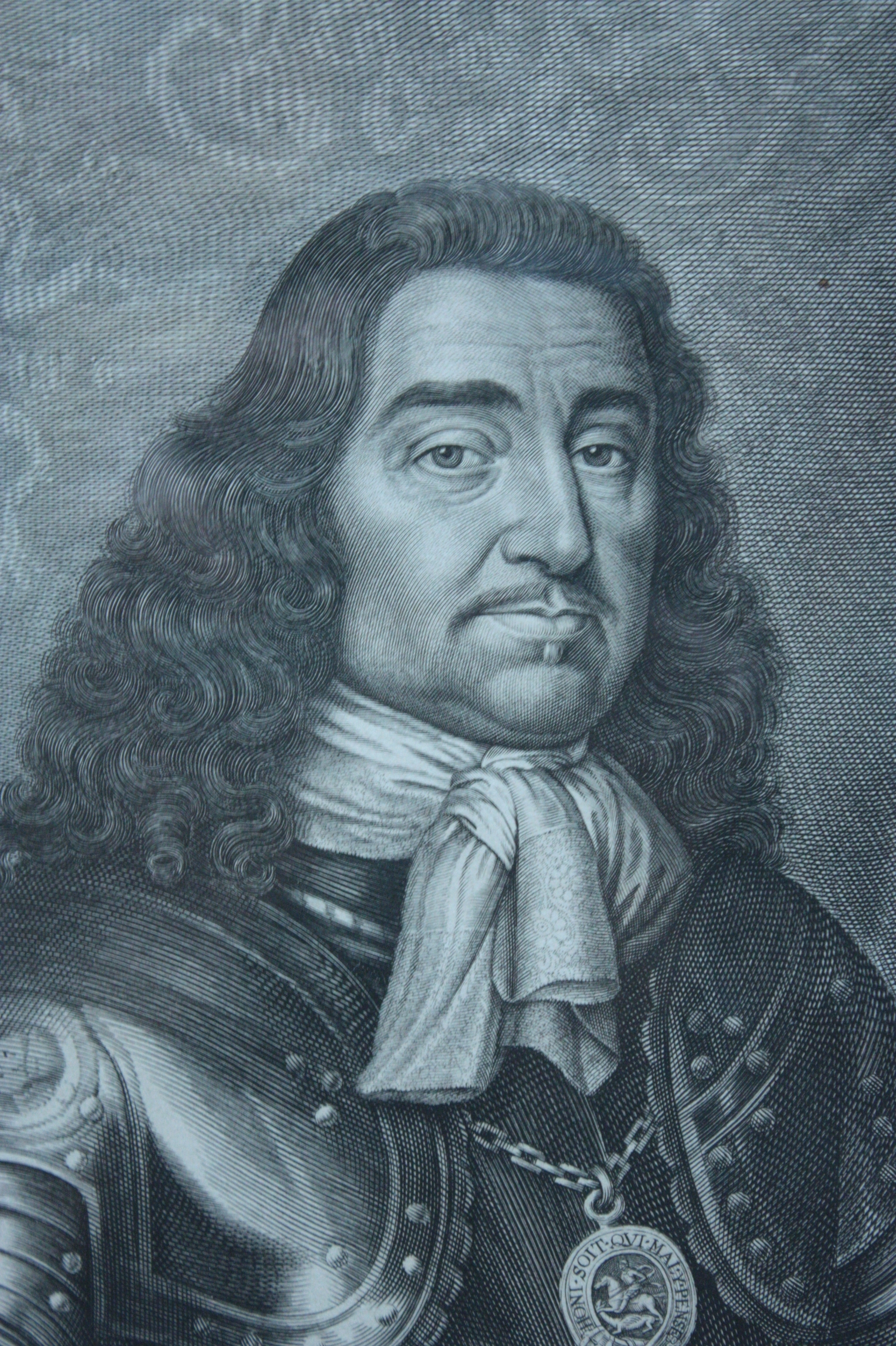
The Duke of Albemarle was given the castle by Charles II in 1660.

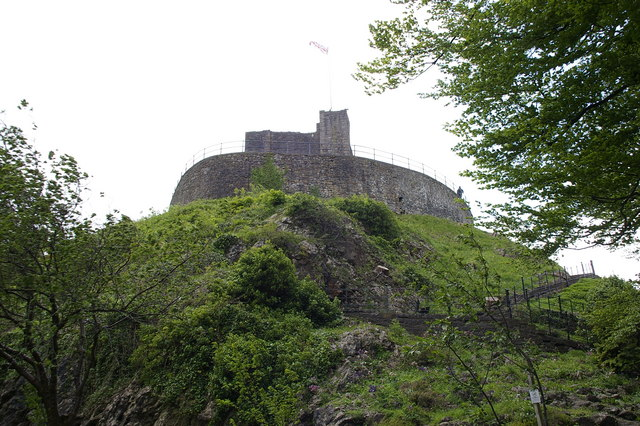
The keep and part of the surviving curtain wall, 2007

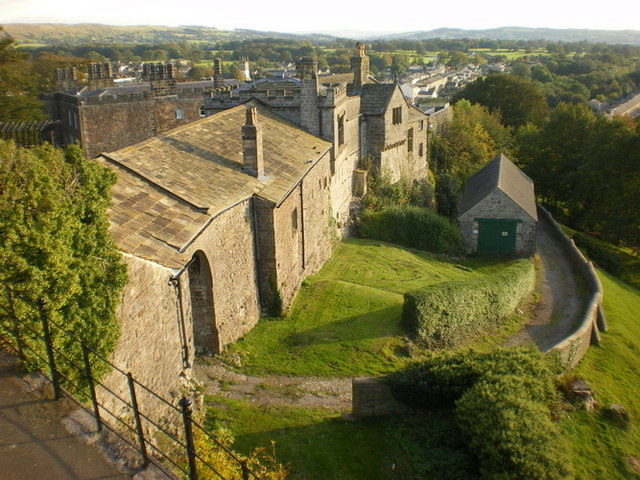
The stables and courthouse, later additions viewed from the wall in 2009

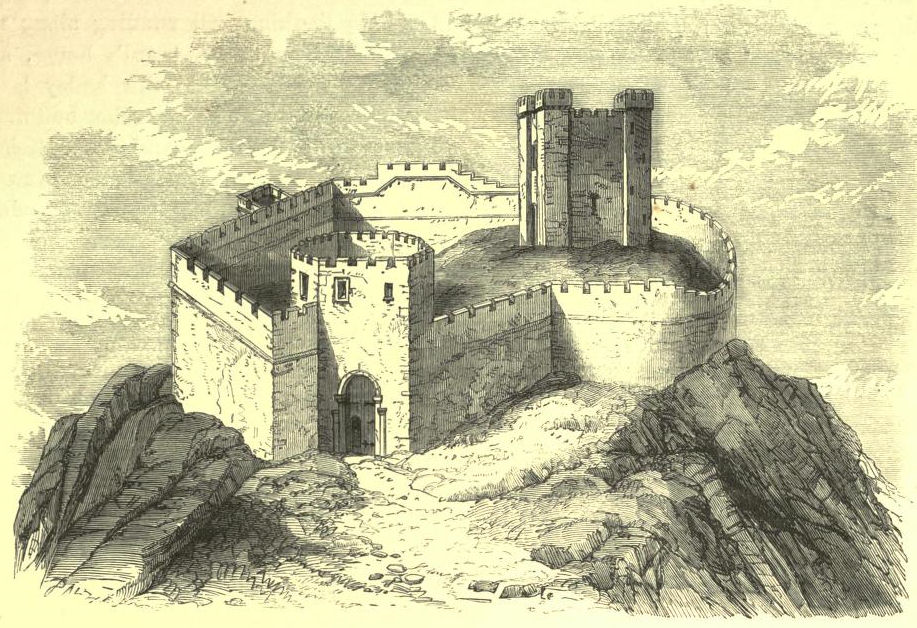
Created for An history of the original Parish of Whalley, and honour of Clitheroe, 4th edition, from a sketch made c. 1650

A 14th-century document called Historia Laceiorum attributed construction of the castle to Robert de Lacy (died 1193), the grandson of the first Robert de Lacy. (Note: The Historia Laceiorum was probably written at Whalley or Kirkstall Abbey in the 1470s and partially based on the Status de Blagborneshire c.1350.) Although it is generally accepted that he built the keep, it is thought that some form of fortification already existed.

Some form of wooden fortress may have existed on the site before the Norman conquest. A reference to the "castellatu Rogerii pictaviensis" in the Domesday Book entry for nearby Barnoldswick, has been used to argue that it was first built before 1086 by Roger the Poitevin. (Note: Robert's son, Henry de Lacy would grant Barnoldswick to monks from Fountains Abbey by 1147.) Others have countered that the passage more likely refers to Lancaster Castle however.

It is thought that there was a castle at Clitheroe in 1102, as Robert de Lacy granted lands formerly the property of Orme le Engleis, within the baillie and below, to Ralph le Rous. A charter from 1122 also mentions the castle's chapel. In the summer of 1138, a Scottish force under William fitz Duncan harried the area, defeating an English force at the Battle of Clitheroe. Although the castle is not mentioned in the known accounts of the battle, it may have been the reason for the battle's location.

=== Later 12th to 14th centuries ===
New construction work was carried out in the late 12th century by Robert de Lacy (died 1193). This Robert died without an heir, and his lands passed to his cousin, and then to her grandson Roger, the constable of Chester. He changed his surname to de Lacy and his descendants would also be the Earls of Lincoln (from 1232).

The castle was garrisoned due to the rebellion of Richard I's brother, Prince John, in the 1190s. (Note: Five knights and fifteen sergeants, each with horses were stationed here, paid for by the sheriff.) During the early 14th century repairs were carried out to buildings within the castle and a new gate was built. When Henry de Lacy, 3rd Earl of Lincoln died in London in 1311, ownership of his properties passed to Thomas, 2nd Earl of Lancaster who had been married to his daughter and heiress Alice. When Sir Adam Banastre led a rebellion against the earl in 1315, Clitheroe was amongst the castles raided for weapons. Lancaster's property was transferred to the crown (escheated) following his attainder and death in 1322; his brother Henry was later granted his lands, which subsequently became part of the Duchy of Lancaster.

=== 15th to 17th centuries ===
In the 15th century, additional repairs were undertaken and a new chamber was built in 1425. During the Wars of the Roses, Edward IV ordered £200 be spent on repairs to the castle, but afterwards it seems to have fallen into disrepair. Duchy records for the honour show that the castle had a constable and a porter in the 1480s. A survey in 1602 described the castle as very ruinous, warning that buildings were very likely to fall down, with another in 1608 stating that parts of the decayed buildings had actually collapsed.

In 1644, during the Civil War, Prince Rupert left a garrison at the castle on his way to relieve the parliamentarian siege of York. They repaired the main gateway and stocked the castle with provisions, only to abandon it following the royalist loss at the Battle of Marston Moor. When the Lancashire militia was ordered to disband in 1649, they refused, occupying the castle for a brief period in a dispute over unpaid wages. The same year Clitheroe was among a number of castles that parliament decided should be 'slighted' to prevent further use, although it is uncertain what demolition work actually resulted. The 19th-century conservation and buttressing of the keep destroyed parts of the original fabric which could have preserved evidence of the slighting. The castle's materials, including timbers, stone, and slate from the chapel roof, were valued for removal.

In 1660 the castle and its honour were given as a reward to the first Duke of Albemarle by Charles II for helping him to regain the crown. From the late 17th century, the castle became the residence of the steward of the honour. Occupants of the castle include John Barcroft of Colne (who died there in 1782).

=== 18th century to present day ===
Ownership of the castle subsequently passed down through the family to the Dukes of Buccleuch. A plan of the castle dated 1723 is thought to have been created when a new house was built for the steward. However it seems that around this time much of the remaining curtain wall was demolished, with garden terraces created. The castle continued to operate as the administrative centre for Blackburnshire until 1822 when the town hall in Church Street was built.

In 1848, with the ruined keep in danger of collapse, it was decided to undertake a series of repairs. At least £221 was spent on the work which included re-building the staircase tower, considerable work to the eastern corner, refacing areas of the interior and exterior with Chatburn limestone, and the installation of a series of buttresses on the southwest and southeast walls.

Before he died in 1878 Dixon Robinson resided at the castle for over 40 years as Steward of the Honour of Clitheroe.

The castle site was purchased by public subscription by the then borough council from Lord Montagu of Beaulieu for £9,500 in November 1920, to create a memorial to the 260 soldiers from the town who died in the First World War.

In the late 1980s the southeast elevation of the keep underwent substantial preservation work. As part of a large redevelopment of the museum, 2008 saw further restoration work to the keep and the first archaeological survey of the site was completed, including test digs.

== Layout ==
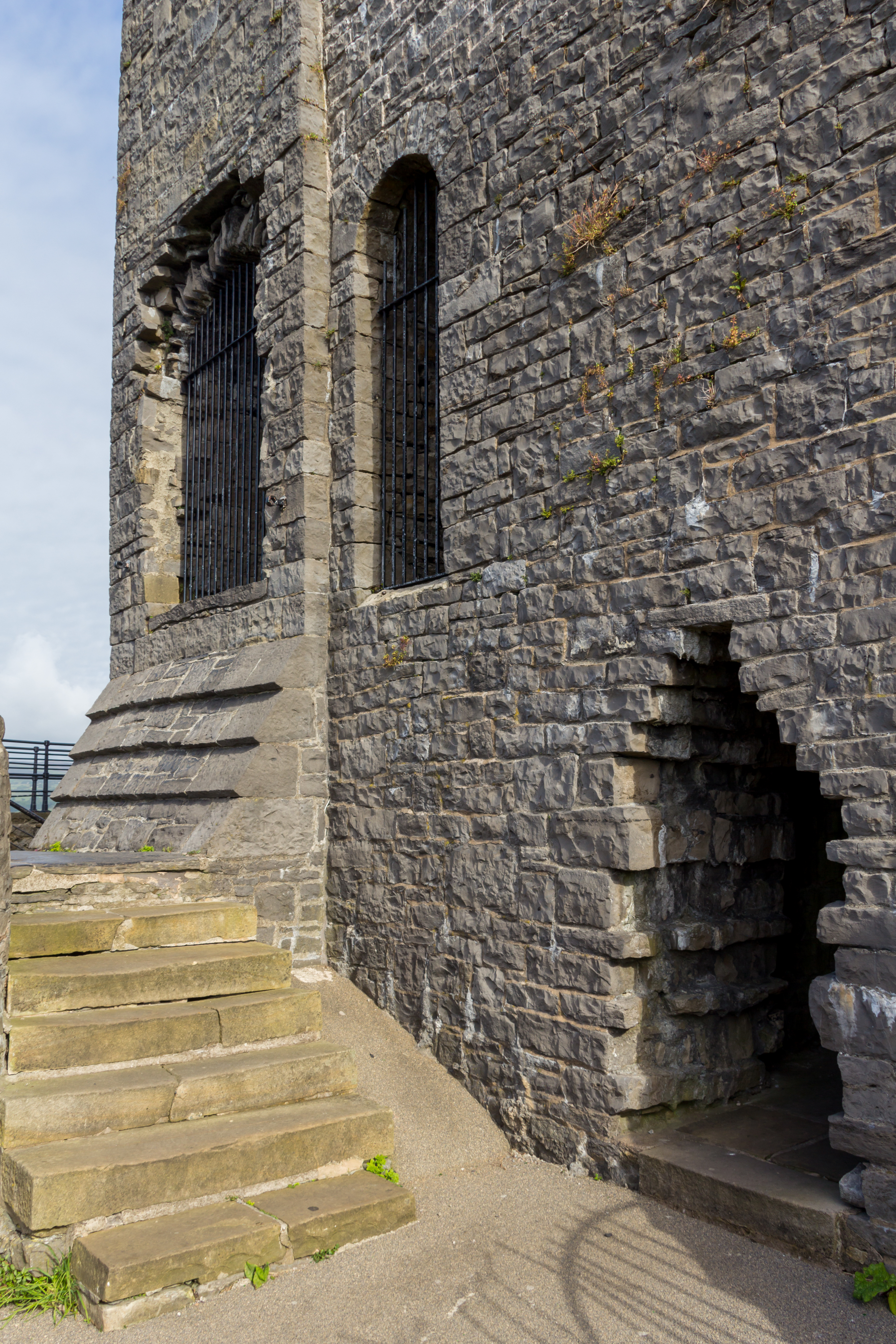
There are three openings on the keep's south-west face. The middle opening, probably a doorway, is original while the others are later insertions.

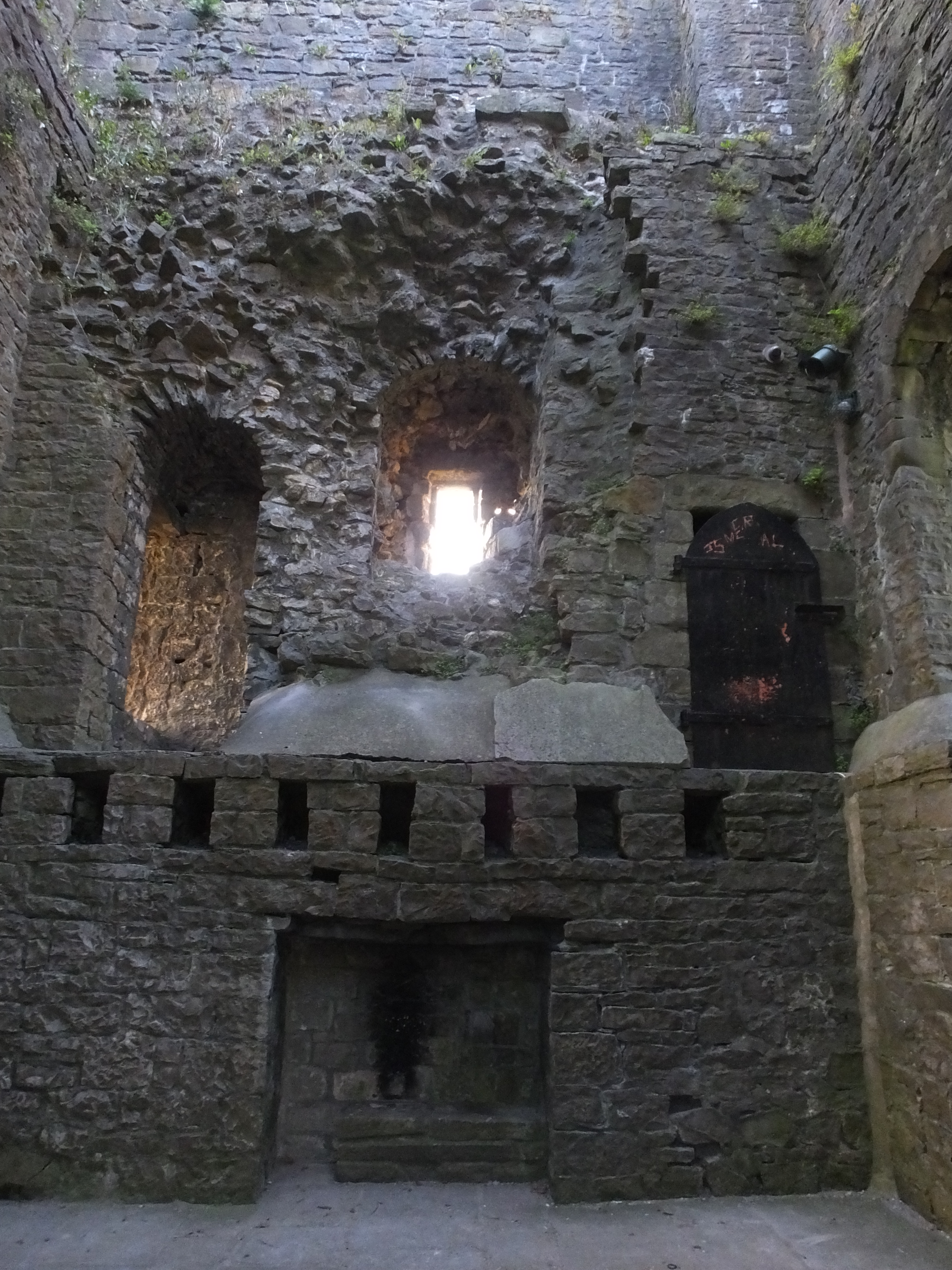
Northwest interior of the keep, showing the first-floor openings (the wooden door at right limits access to the stairway) in 2015

The Historic England scheduled monument record classifies Clitheroe as an enclosure castle, the principal defence being the wall surrounding the site. It was essentially a motte-and-bailey layout, with a natural outcrop utilised as the motte. The keep is the second smallest surviving stone-built keep in England. It is thought that, as the keep was so small, other essential buildings such as the great hall may have been located on the site where the education suite now stands. A 1602 survey mentions Mr Auditor's chamber, the hall and buttery, and there would likely also have been stables and lodgings for any stationed soldiers. The southwest corner of the site next to the Steward's house was formerly the kitchen gardens. The medieval castle keep and some of the curtain wall remain above ground, although the medieval buildings in the bailey have not survived. However, there are sub-surface remains of the castle gateway and other buildings. A document from 1304 mentions ditches and moats, thought to be a distance from the castle at a lower level, but these have since been filled in. The footpath that ascends the castle mound to the keep, and the western access road are believed to be later additions.

=== Keep ===
The keep is a square tower with flat pilasters at the corners giving the appearance of corner towers, with the walls being 8.75 feet (2.7 m) wide at the base. The ground floor is thought to have been accessed from above via a trapdoor. There are recessed arrowslits in the middle of the walls on three sides, except the northwest. Two of these have been converted into entrances, with the other, on the southwest side, filled-in. The main entrance to the keep was on the first floor on the northwest side, accessed by an external staircase. Next to this, in the western corner tower, is the lower entry to a spiral staircase, which today rises to a height of 46 feet (14.0 m) from the ground, somewhat higher than the other surviving walls. It is thought that the keep would have had a parapet with at least one turret above the staircase. The first floor also had another door in the southwest wall with recessed arrowslits in the other walls. The doorway may have led to the ramparts of the adjacent curtain wall. What today appears to be another doorway next to this, leading by a right-angled passage into the keep, was actually a barrel vaulted mural chamber, which seems to have had an arrowslit in the wall at this end, now breached. This chamber may have been a garderobe, but this is debated. The walls above show no signs of any wall openings even to the staircase. The re-building work may have removed any evidence of a doorway to what was possibly a second floor of sleeping accommodation, or the walls may have concealed a pitched roof, similar to the keep at Peveril. There is also no evidence of fireplace openings in any part of the keep. The repairs made during the restoration work used limestone from quarries at the nearby village of Chatburn, making the additions identifiable.

==== The hole ====
The first-floor arrow loop on the southeast side has today widened, most likely the result of natural decay. There is an ancient local legend that the Devil once gathered rocks in an apron, and threw a boulder aimed at the castle, from a place on Pendle Hill called Apronful. However the apron broke, dropping a pile of stones and causing the shot to land near the church in Pendleton. The guidebook to the castle relates this local tale, "they always said that the hole in the side of the keep was made by Cromwell in the Civil War. It's only a story but they say that he attacked the castle and fired at it with a cannon from the top of Pendle Hill – it must have been a good cannon for the time to reach that far!"

=== Gatehouse and curtain wall ===
It is thought the gatehouse tower stood approximately at the site of the stone gate piers on the drive up to the museum. A tall embattled wall, it is believed, ran round the top of the hill, turning behind the steward's house, and then behind the steward's gallery and around the keep. A 16th-century sketch shows a four-sided, two-storey gatehouse with a Norman round-headed doorway, the door including a wicket gate; a small part may be preserved in the wall to the east. Possibly similar the one at Tickhill, the upper floor may have served as a lodging for the castle porter who acted as the jailer. To the west, the remains of the curtain wall climb the slope, connecting to the wall at the top. It has been suggested that the 6 foot (1.8 m) wide wall that surrounds the keep on three sides may represent an earlier construction phase than the keep itself. It may have been a shell keep containing a number of lean-to buildings, with the southern section later demolished and the present keep built inside. Like the keep this section of wall was re-built in the mid-19th century, with the work distinguishable from the original, the north-western exterior face being best preserved. A section of western curtain wall survives next to the well, now separated from the other walls by the stables and court house buildings. The bailey is thought to have been divided into an inner and outer section, with a second gatehouse and/or defensive ditch to control the entry, of which no trace survives. The garden terraces that were created in the mid-18th century cut up much of the site, making it difficult to identify the castle's limits.

=== Chapel of St Michael de Castro ===
The chapel of St Michael within the castle in mentioned in charters from 1120, and was ecclesiastically separated from the ancient parish of Whalley. Some records call it extra-parochial and it is sometimes described as the parish church of the castle and demesne, with the forest districts of the honour. The chapel had reinforced walls and formed part of the inner bailey wall, and was located at the southern end of the terrace next to the old stable block. When Henry de Lacy (c.1251–1311) gave Whalley to the monks of Stanlaw (Whalley Abbey), he withheld the chapel and its district. In 1334, the Abbey entered a legal battle for control over it, finally purchasing the advowson from John of Gaunt in 1365. After the Dissolution of the Monasteries in the late 1530s, the benefactions it had received under the monks were transferred to the chapel at Whitewell. The chapel was in ruins in 1660, and the allowance for the chaplain was transferred to St Mary Magdalene's Church. By 1717 nothing but the decayed walls remained.

=== Great hall ===
The inner bailey probably also contained the great hall. A document dated 1324 refers to the rebuilding of a structure, which given the large quantities of material and labour required, would have been on an appropriate scale. The materials included 30 wagon-loads of timber from Bowland with a further 12 loads from Leagram Park and 45 wagon loads of stone slates for the roof. The work took five carpenters over 17 weeks to complete.

The Hundred court was held here, with the steward of the honour acting as judge, originally every three weeks. At some time probably in the 12th century this changed to twice a year, with the three-week court continuing but being limited to claims less than 40 shillings. The demesne manors instead held halmote courts, with those for Chatburn, Worston and Pendleton also being held at the castle.

=== Jail ===
The castle is known to have acted as a jail, and important men were occasionally imprisoned there. King Henry VI may have been held briefly as he was captured outside Clitheroe in 1464, during the Wars of the Roses. In 1506 the porter was imprisoned in his own jail after attending a meeting of armed men at Whalley. Whether the keep was used as the jail is uncertain; there could have been a separate dungeon elsewhere in the bailey.

== Museum ==
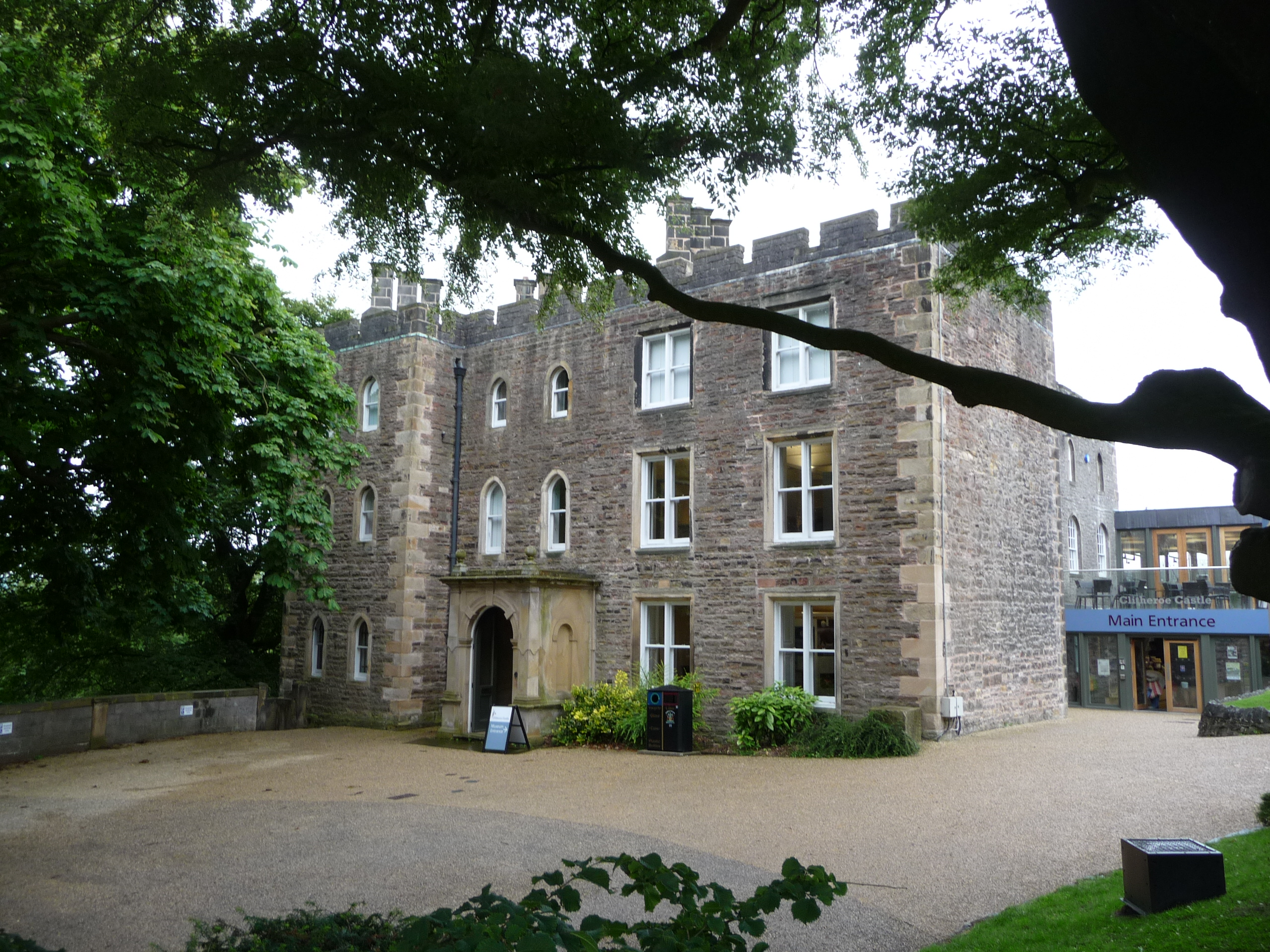
Clitheroe Castle Museum in 2010

Today the buildings on the castle site form Clitheroe Castle Museum. The museum is based in the former Steward's House, a Grade II listed building, originally built in the 18th century, with later additions and modifications. The former courthouse is now a temporary exhibition space called the Steward's Gallery. The museum was originally opened in 1954 in the Steward's Gallery. It underwent a £3.5-million refurbishment and redevelopment, and was officially opened on 23 June 2009 by Prince Richard, Duke of Gloucester. Its social history collection contains about 5,000 items, and the geology collection includes four type and figured specimens. It also has smaller collections of natural history, local art and period costume, and the archaeology collection includes items recovered from excavations on the site.

== Castle grounds ==
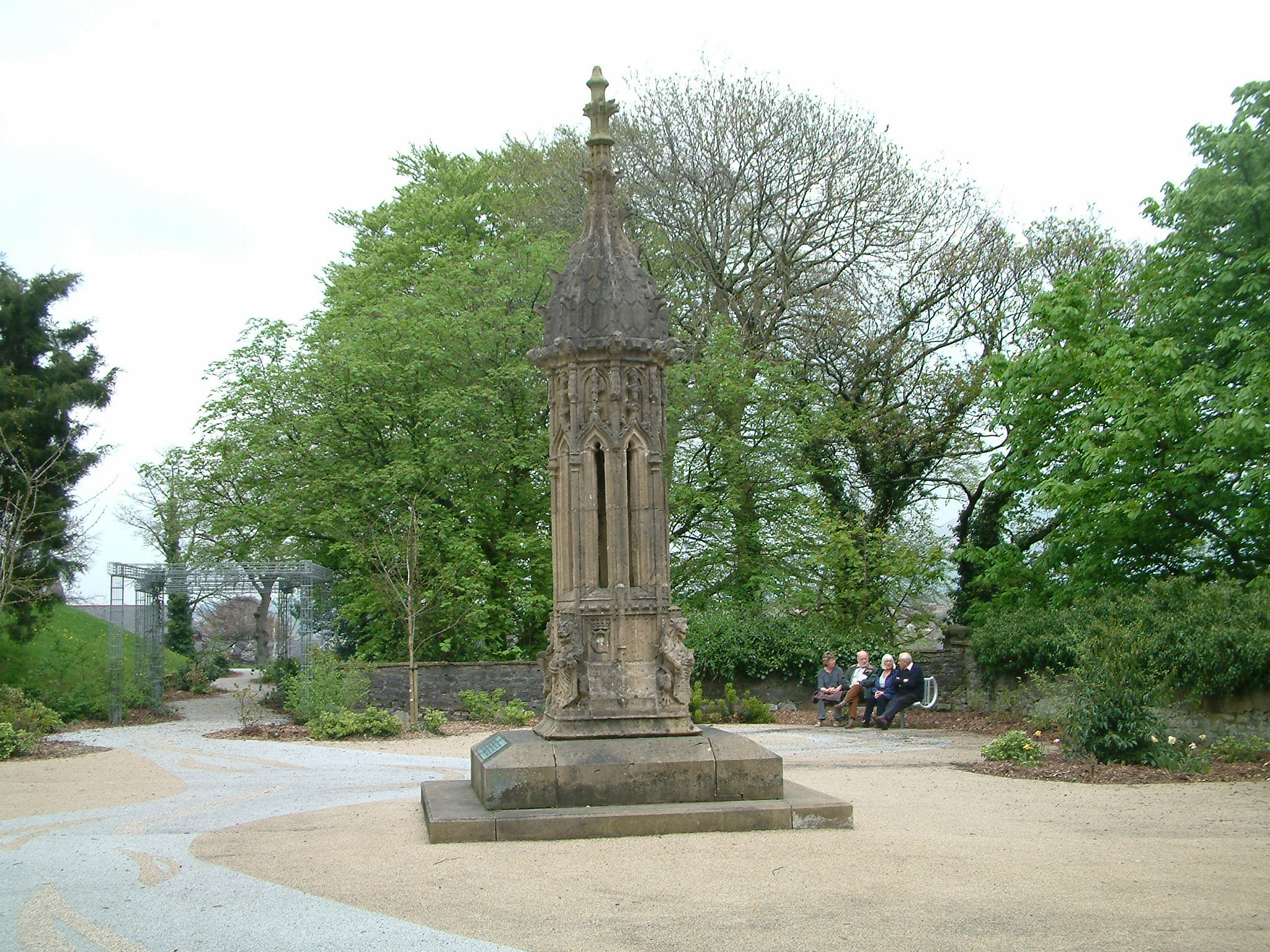
The Pinnacle in the former rose garden, 2008

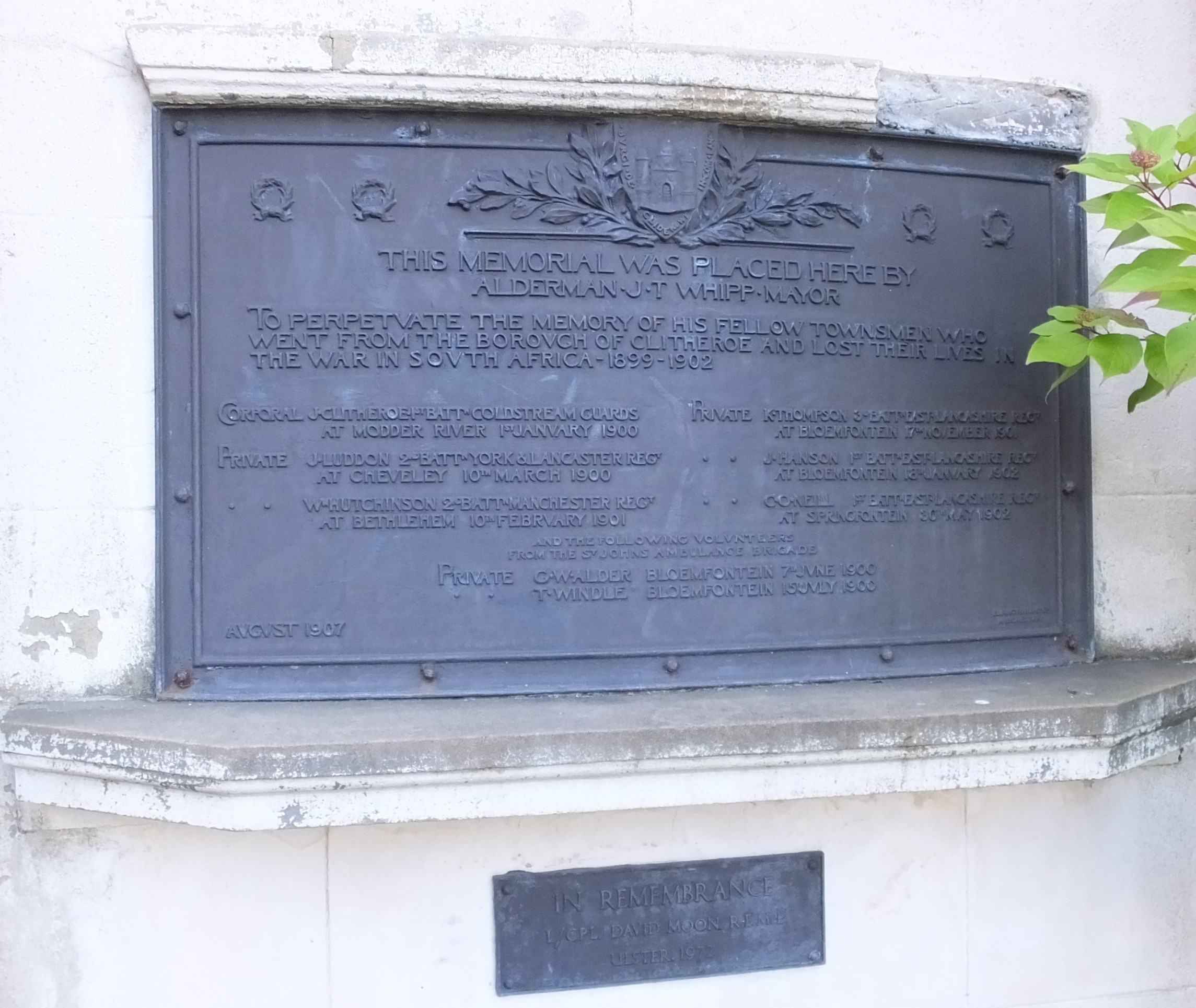
Clitheroe Second Boer War memorial plaque, 1907

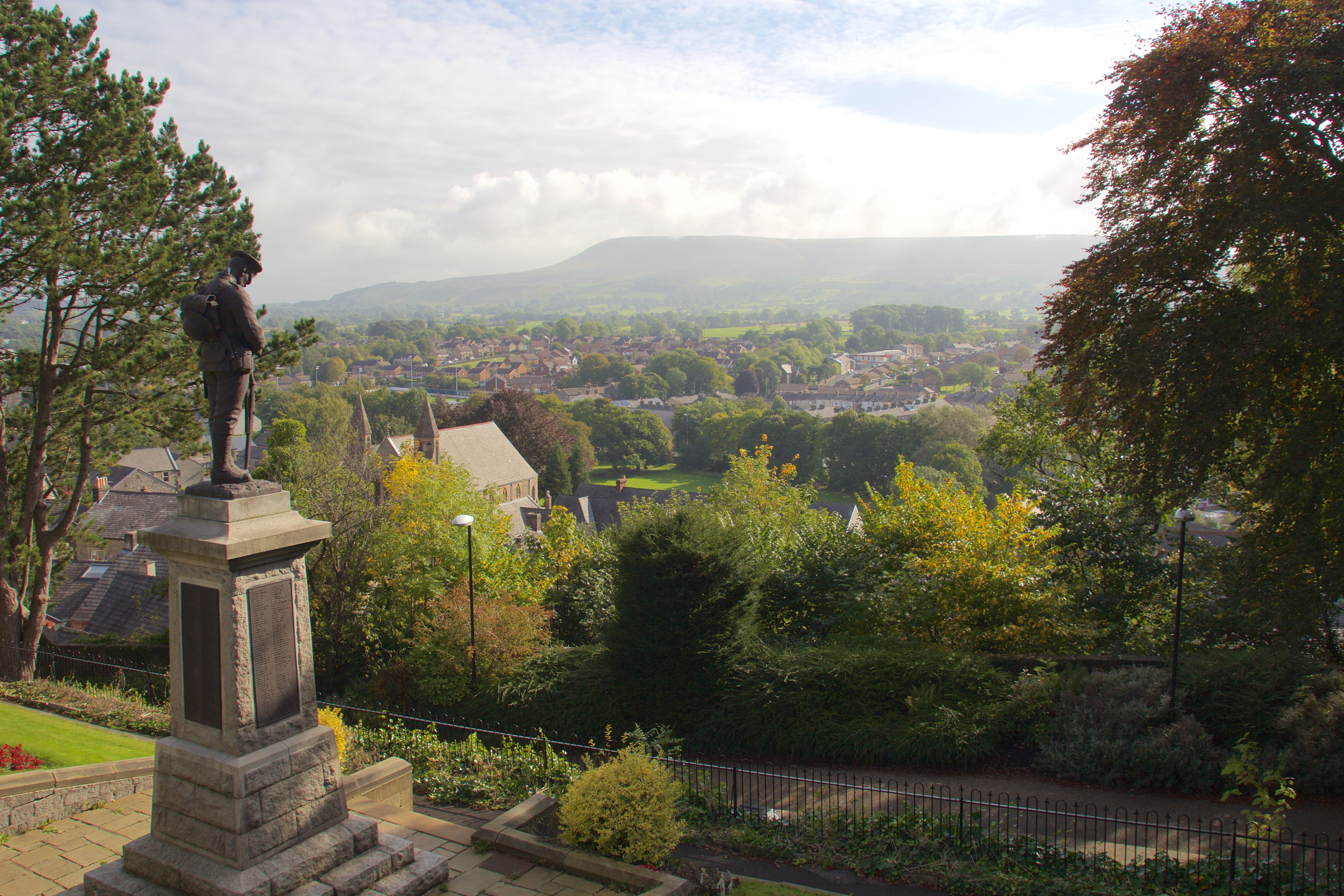
The war memorial at left with Pendle Hill on the horizon in 2015

The 6.4-hectare (16-acre) castle grounds site was established as a public park after the castle site was acquired by the council. Of the £15,000 raised in 1920, £9,500 was spent to purchase the site, and the rest used laying out the park. It incorporates the early 18th-century garden terraces created for the steward's residence. Bowling greens, tennis courts, a putting green, a bandstand and pavilion café were installed, and specimen trees planted as part of the landscaping include a fern-leaf beech and a dawn redwood. The war memorial, a sculpture of a soldier standing atop a pedestal in a mourning pose with head bowed and arms reversed, is located south of the keep. The main inscription reads "Erected by the inhabitants of Clitheroe in grateful remembrance of their fellow townsmen who gave their lives in defence of their king and country in the Great War 1914 1918". The sculptor was Louis Frederick Roslyn, and the same figure is used in the memorial at Slaidburn. There is also a memorial plaque to those killed in the Second Boer War, installed in 1907.

The centrepiece of the old rose garden south of the castle is a turret from the Houses of Parliament, presented to the borough by its MP (Sir William Brass) in 1937, in commemoration of the coronation of King George VI. Also known as the Pinnacle, it dates back to the mid-1800s rebuilding work at the Palace of Westminster. Clitheroe Civic Society has been running a project to restore the monument after it was discovered that corroding iron fixings have been damaging the stonework.

In April 2006, a new skatepark officially opened in the Woone Lane corner of the castle grounds, the £200,000 cost funded by the Lancaster Foundation charitable trust. Also opened in 2006 is a turf labyrinth designed by Jim Buchanan. In 2010, ten plaques featuring key events in the history of Clitheroe where installed on the walls of the creative activity area next to the keep. To commemorate the 400th anniversary of the trials of the Pendle witches, a new long-distance walking route called the Lancashire Witches Walk was created. Ten tercet waymarkers, designed by Stephen Raw, each inscribed with a verse of a poem by Carol Ann Duffy, were installed along the route, with the fourth located at the castle.

The town's annual Guy Fawkes Night bonfire fireworks display is among a number of regular events staged.

=== Castle Hill ===
The keep is on the summit of a large carboniferous rock, which is the highest and most prominent point for miles around. This is now identified as a Waulsortian mudmound. The rock comprises light grey, unbedded, micritic limestone, heavily jointed with calcite veining. There is some galena and sphalerite mineralisation in the joints. It is rich in fossils: mainly Crinoid ossicles together with gastropods and brachiopods. There has been much debate on how these mud mounds were formed. One theory led to them being called reef knolls, knoll reefs, or bioherms but work in 1972 by Miller & Grayson explained their structure. Clitheroe Castle is the most southwesterly of a chain of mudmounds in the Bowland Sub-basin of the Craven Basin, that has been dubbed the Clitheroe 'Reef' Belt. They include important geological sites at Salthill and Bellman quarries, Crow Hill and Worsaw, Gerna and Sykes.

== See also ==
- Honour of Clitheroe and Dixon Robinson
- Castles in Great Britain and Ireland
- Pontefract Castle
- Grade I listed buildings in Lancashire
- Scheduled monuments in Lancashire
- Listed buildings in Clitheroe
