= St Mary Magdalene's Church, Clitheroe =

Coordinates: 53.8742°N 2.3905°W

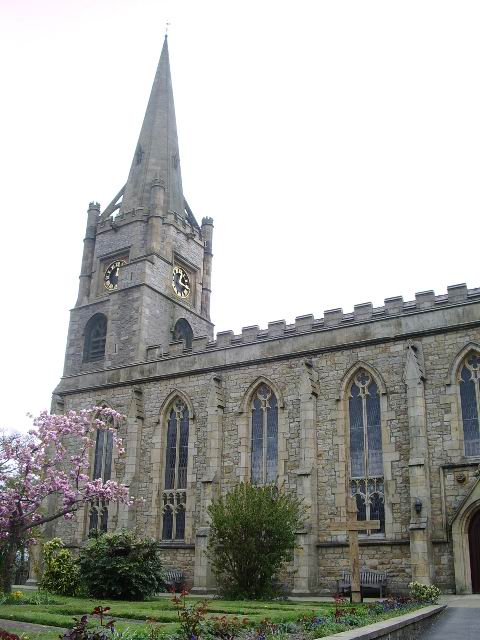
- St Mary Magdalene's Church from the southeast

- Location in the Borough of Ribble Valley
- OS grid reference: SD 744,421
- Location: Church Street, Clitheroe, Lancashire
- Country: England
- Denomination: Anglican
- Website: St Mary Magdalene, Clitheroe

History
- Status: Parish church
- Dedication: Saint Mary Magdalene

Architecture
- Functional status: Active
- Heritage designation: Grade II*
- Designated: 19 May 1950
- Architect(s): Rickman and Hutchinson, Paley and Austin (restoration)
- Architectural type: Church
- Style: Gothic, Gothic Revival

Specifications
- Materials: Gritstone, slate roofs

Administration
- Province: York
- Diocese: Blackburn
- Archdeaconry: Blackburn
- Deanery: Whalley
- Parish: St. Mary Magdalene Clitheroe

Clergy
- Vicar(s): Appointed, to be confirmed

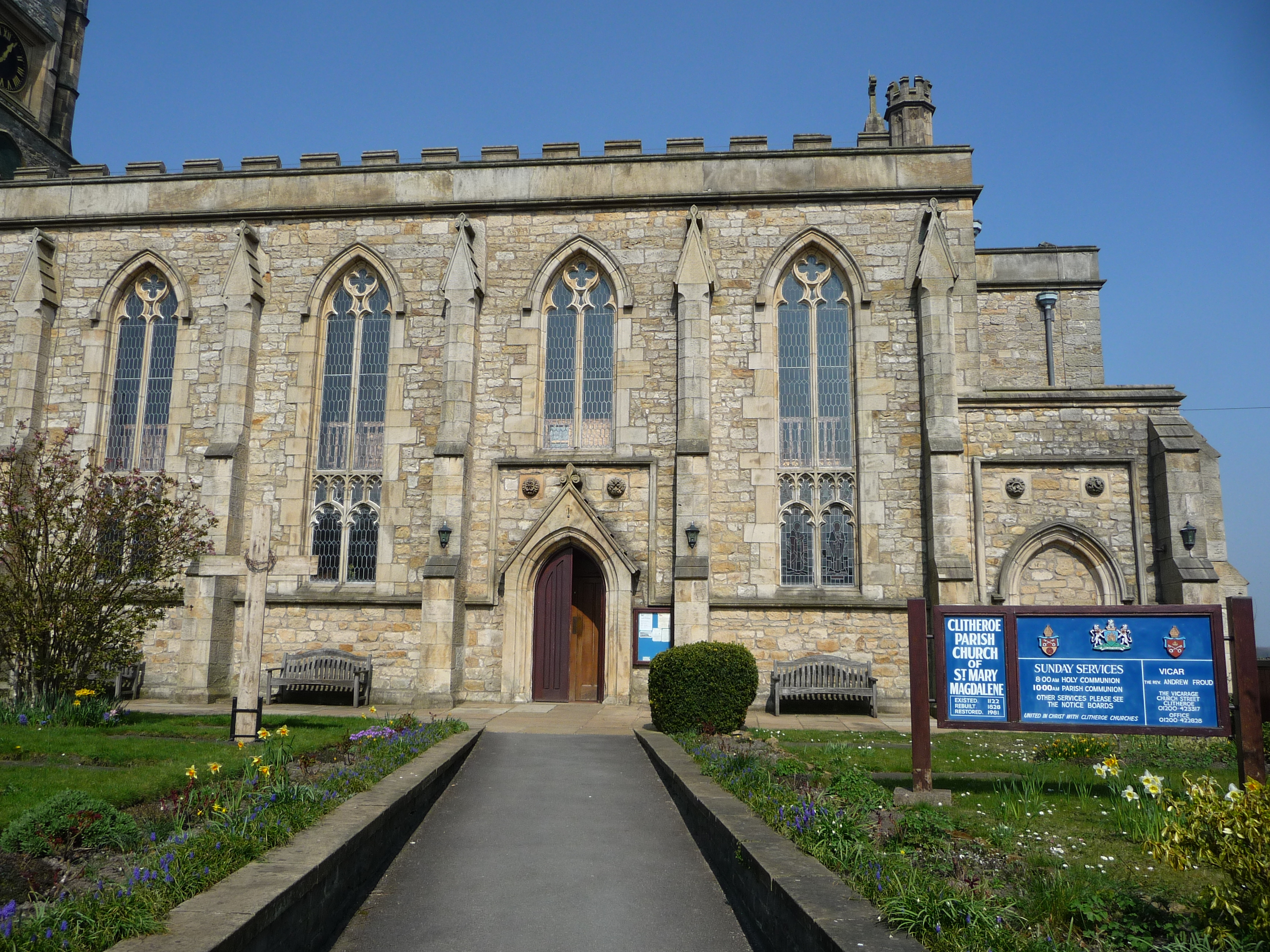
St Mary Magdalene - entrance

St Mary Magdalene's Church is located in Church Street, Clitheroe, Lancashire, England. It is the Anglican parish church of the town, and is in the deanery of Whalley, the archdeaconry of Blackburn, and the diocese of Blackburn. The church, dedicated to Jesus' companion Mary Magdalene, is recorded in the National Heritage List for England as a designated Grade II* listed building.

== History ==
The earliest record of a church on the site is in 1122, when it was granted to Pontefract Priory. The tower and east window of the present church date from the 15th century. The rest of the church was rebuilt by Thomas Rickman and Henry Hutchinson in 1828–29. In 1844 an additional stage and the spire were added to the tower. The church was restored in 1881 by the Lancaster architects Paley and Austin. In 1898 the timber roof and clerestory were added by Frederick Robinson. In 1913, the west gallery was removed. This had contained the original organ made by Samuel Renn in 1834, which was moved elsewhere, possibly to Chester. The new organ, made by J. J. Binns, was sited at the east end of the church. In 2008 a piece of the spire fell off and it was discovered that the spire was crumbling, and in 2010 an appeal was launched to raise money for its repair.

== Architecture ==
=== Exterior ===
The church is constructed in coursed rubble gritstone with freestone dressings. It has a slate roof and clay ridge tiles. Its plan consists of a six-bay nave with a clerestory, north and south aisles, a southwest vestry, a chancel with a south chapel, a two-storey north vestry, and a west tower. The tower is in Perpendicular style, with four stages, angle buttresses, and a southeast stair turret. In the bottom stage of the tower is a west doorway, above which is a three-light window. In the second stage are narrow square-headed windows, and the third stage contains two-light windows. In the top stage is a round clock face in a square frame on each side. On the corners of the towers are octagonal turrets that rise above the parapet, which is embattled. The spire is supported by flying buttresses, and contains lucarnes. The clerestory contains two-light square-headed windows, it has an embattled parapet, and octagonal angle turrets at the east end. The aisles have plain parapets, and buttresses rising to gables. The west windows have two lights, the windows along the sides are tall and also have two lights, and all contain Decorated-style tracery. On the south side in the fifth bay is a doorway; the corresponding bay on the north side has a door leading into the vestry. The east wall of the chancel has angle buttresses and a five light window with Perpendicular tracery. In the south chapel is a blocked doorway and a two-light square-headed east window. The north vestry has a blocked north doorway, and a two-light east window with a triangular window above it.

=== Interior ===
Inside the church are north and south galleries carried on cast iron posts. The arcades between the nave and the aisles are supported by tall octagonal piers. In the chancel is an ogee-headed piscina dating from the 14th or 15th century. The octagonal font is plain, and is said to be from the 17th century; it stands on a 20th-century base. The polygonal pulpit was moved here in 1979 from St John's Church, Darwen. The monuments include damaged effigies dating from the 15th century in the south chapel. Also in the chapel is a brass plate to the memory of John Webster, an astrologist and local headmaster, who died in 1682. On the north chancel wall is a hatchment, and wall tablets to the Aspinall family with dates in the 18th and 19th centuries. The south chancel contains a wall tablet to Thomas Wilson, who died in 1813, by Richard Westmacott. In the north aisle is an alabaster memorial to those who died in the First World War. There is heraldic stained glass in the east window, with some fragments of medieval glass.

The four-manual organ was rebuilt in 1961 by Nicholson. It has been repaired twice by Sixsmith; in 1970 following damage by water; and in 1982, when it was rebuilt after fire damage. It was rebuilt again in 2007 by Principal Pipe Organs. There is a ring of eight bells, all of which were cast in 1928 by Gillett & Johnston.

== See also ==
- Grade II* listed buildings in Lancashire
- Listed buildings in Clitheroe
- List of ecclesiastical works by Paley and Austin
