= Mearley =

Civil parish in Lancashire, England

Coordinates: 53.865°N 2.352°W

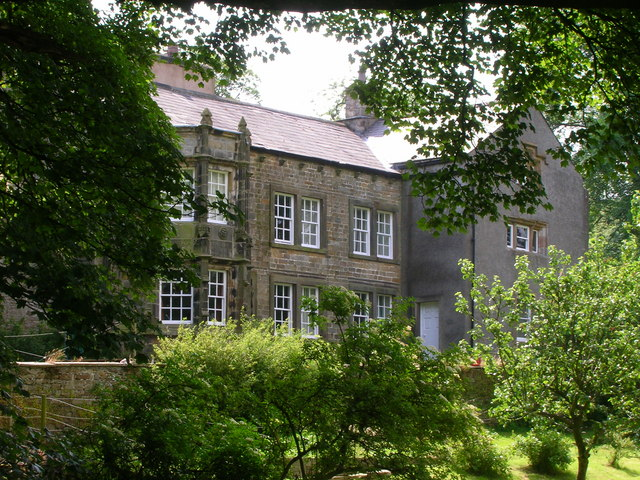
- Little Mearley Hall

- Shown within Ribble Valley Location within Lancashire
- Population: 25 (2001)
- OS grid reference: SD769410
- Civil parish: Mearley
- District: Ribble Valley
- Shire county: Lancashire
- Region: North West
- Country: England
- Sovereign state: United Kingdom
- Post town: CLITHEROE
- Postcode district: BB7
- Dialling code: 01200
- Police: Lancashire
- Fire: Lancashire
- Ambulance: North West
- UK Parliament: Ribble Valley

Mearley is a civil parish in Lancashire, England. The parish is north-west of Pendle Hill, east of Clitheroe, and is in the Ribble Valley district. It is a small parish with no villages or hamlets and a population of 25, the second smallest in Lancashire, at the 2001 census. It has no parish council, but instead has a parish meeting shared with neighbouring Worston. From the 2011 Census population information for both Mearley and Worston is included within the civil parish of Pendleton, giving a total of 349. The eastern part of the parish is included in the Pendle outlier section of the Forest of Bowland Area of Outstanding Natural Beauty (AONB).

The parish adjoins the Ribble Valley parishes of Worston, Clitheroe, Pendleton and Sabden, along with Goldshaw Booth in the Borough of Pendle.

The name is thought to mean the meadow or clearing at the boundary, from the Old English ġemǣre and lēah.

Mearley was once a township in the ancient parish of Whalley. This became a civil parish in 1866, forming part of the Clitheroe Rural District from 1894 till 1974.

Along with Wiswell and Barrow (since 2015), both Mearley and Worston form the Wiswell and Pendleton ward of Ribble Valley Borough Council.

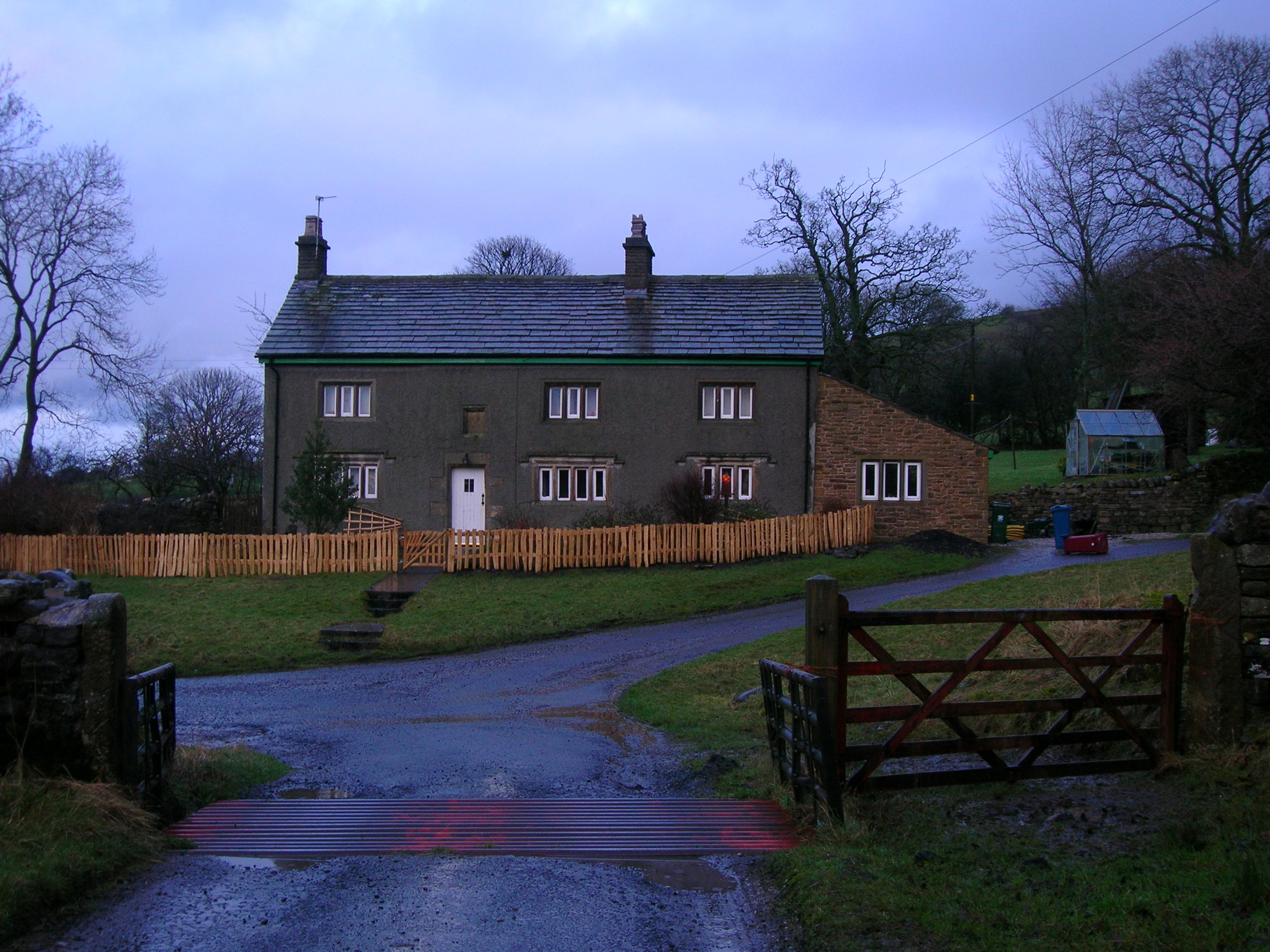
Mearley Hall farmhouse

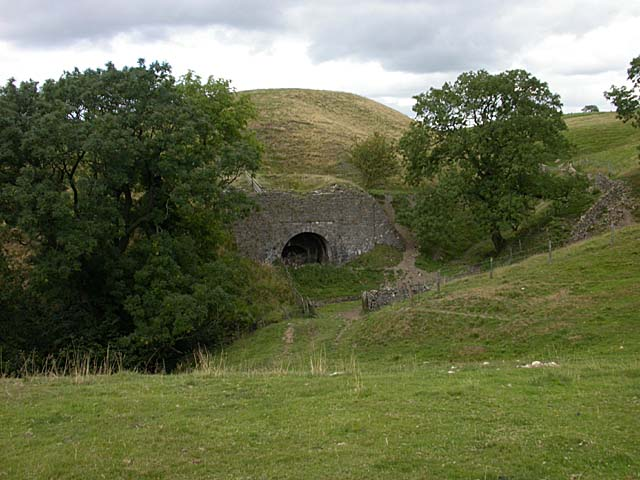
A disused lime kiln near Mearley Hall

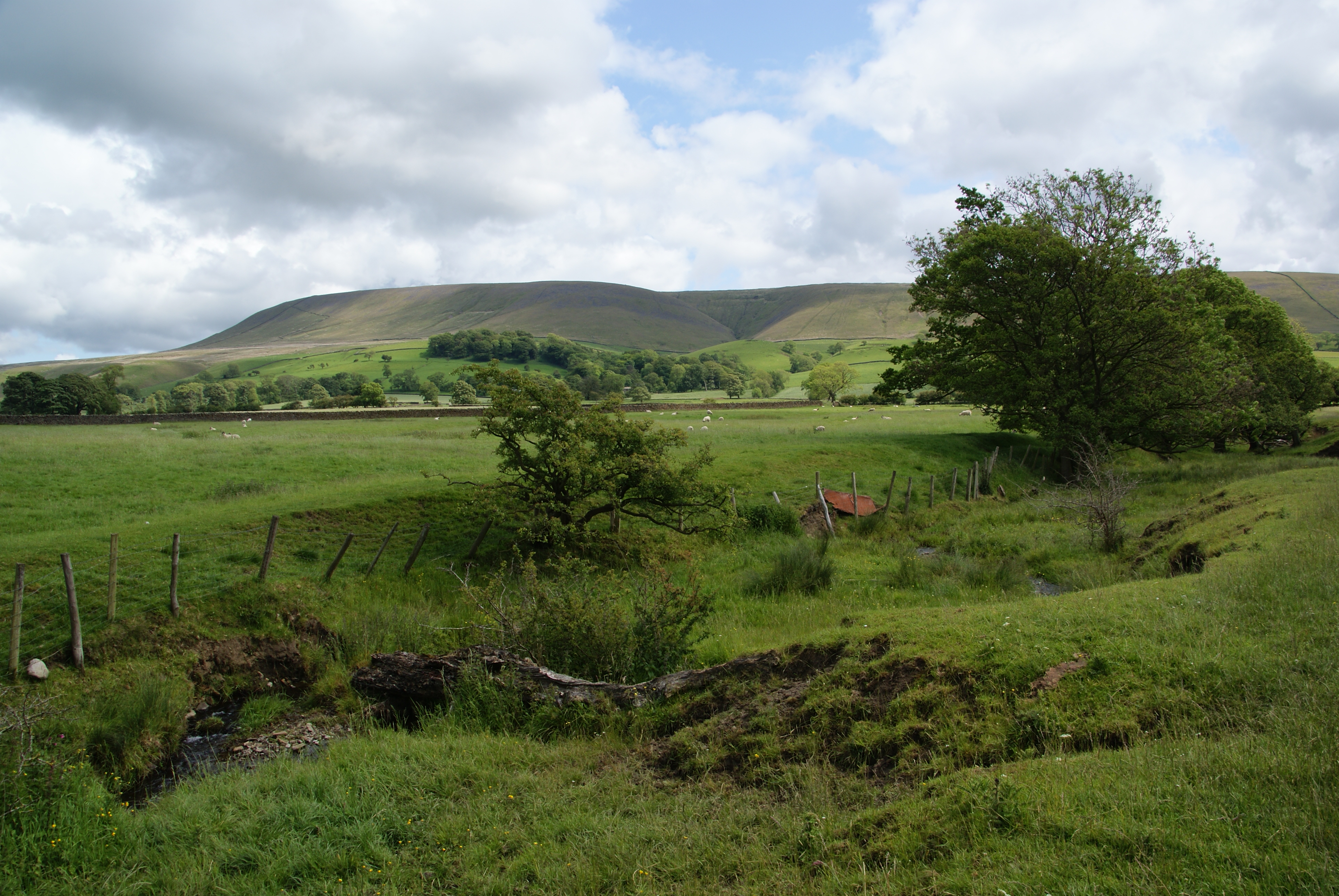
Mearley Brook runs through the north of the parish

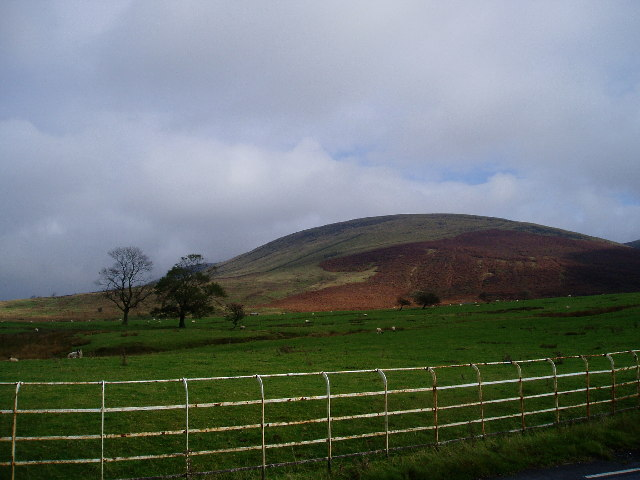
Mearley Moor viewed from Pendleton

== See also ==
- Listed buildings in Mearley
