= List of mills in Clitheroe =

Clitheroe in Lancashire, England is known for limestone quarrying, but it also developed a cotton industry.

== The mills ==
Name	Architect	Location	Built	Demolished	Served (Years)
Albion Mill		SD 53°52′23″N 2°23′13″W			
Brewery Mill aka Claremont Mill		SD749415 53°52′08″N 2°22′59″W			
	Notes: Built in 1788 as a brewery, it became a printworks in 1809 and a sizing house in 1823. In 1834 a 7 storey spinning mill with weaving sheds was built, the engine was by William Roberts & Co of Nelson.The mill burnt down in 1896 but was reconstructed. In 2006 it had become a furniture warehouse with shops.				
Brooks Mill		SD 53°52′26″N 2°23′10″W			
Commercial Mill		SD 53°51′47″N 2°24′00″W			
Foulsykes Mill		SD 53°52′05″N 2°23′56″W			
Holmes Mill aka Thornbers Mill and possibly Greenacre Mill		SD742414 53°52′05″N 2°23′42″W	1820	Standing	206
	Notes: This is a complex combined mill which has housed spinning, weaving and printing, spinning and sizing in an 1823 four storey 13 bay block, and an 1830s block. The offices and warehouses were built in 1843 and weaving sheds in 1853. At this time there were 16,000 mule spindles and 707 looms. It was powered by at least two beam engines supplemented by a 24" x 3' stroke horizontal. These were replaced in 1910 by a 350 IHP Clayton, Goodfellow & Co. Ltd horizontal cross-compound type. This worked at 68rpm				
Jubilee Mill		SD 53°52′23″N 2°22′59″W	1887	Standing	139
	Notes: These were single storey stone built power weaving sheds built in 1887 by The Clitheroe Jubilee Mill Company Ltd. There was a sandstone engine house with a brick chimney. The current occupants are Trutex, the large school uniform manufacturing company.				
Low Moor Mill		SD729418 53°52′19″N 2°25′01″W			
	Notes: The first mill, a five storey spinning mill opened in 1782. It and 28 workers cottage were sold to Parker and Parker in 1791, and then in 1799 to Garnett and Horsfall. The mill was demolished and replaced. In 1840, power looms were introduced further buildings and a substantial number of houses were added, creating Low Moor, Lancashire, by 1928 when the mill closed, there were 200 houses, nine shops, a school, church and chapels. The 1840 mill was powered by 3 iron waterwheels on a leet from the River Ribble, supplemented by beam engines.				
Primrose Mills		SD738407 53°51′43″N 2°24′00″W	1810	Standing	216
	Notes: This site contained a late eighteenth century spinning mill, which was replaced by a calico printworks in 1810. This became a bleachworks and a dyeworks and a new spinning mill was added in 1860. The site contains a mill-pond and a mill-lodge, both fed by the Mearley Brook.				
Queensway Mill		SD 53°52′05″N 2°23′31″W			
	Notes: Maybe now Homebase				
Salford Bridge Mill		SD 53°52′05″N 2°23′31″W	1833		173
	Notes: Salford derives from 'the ford between willows'and was where the main road south crossed the Mearley Brook. A weaving shed and a spinning mill was set up here between from 1833 to 1860, though there was an earlier mill on the site. The weaving sheds survived until 2006, the current occupants are now Sainsbury's				
Shaw Bridge Mill		SD 53°52′12″N 2°23′17″W			
Shaw Bridge Old Mill		SD 53°52′19″N 2°23′13″W			
Upbrooks Mill		SD 53°52′30″N 2°22′26″W			
Victoria Mill		SD 53°52′05″N 2°23′56″W			
	Notes: Demolished and the site is used for housing.				
Waterloo Mill		SD 53°52′08″N 2°22′59″W			
	Notes: History of the Jet Engine see:Frank Whittle				

== See also ==
- Category:Lists of textile mills in the United Kingdom
- List of mills owned by the Lancashire Cotton Corporation Limited
- List of mills in Lancashire

== Bibliography ==
- Ashmore, Owen (1982). The industrial archaeology of North-west England. Manchester University Press. ISBN 0-7190-0820-4.
