= Pendle Hill (disambiguation) =

Pendle Hill is a hill in Lancashire, England.

Pendle Hill may also refer to:

- Pendle Hill (China, Maine), a historic house
- Pendle Hill, New South Wales, a suburb of Sydney, Australia
  - Pendle Hill railway station
- Pendle Hill Quaker Center for Study and Contemplation, a study centre in Wallingford, Pennsylvania, United States

== See also ==
- Pendle (disambiguation)
