= Pendle =

Pendle may refer to:

- Borough of Pendle in Lancashire, England
  - Pendle (UK Parliament constituency)
- Pendle Hill in Lancashire, England
  - Forest of Pendle, hilly landscape surrounding the hill
- Pendle College of the University of Lancaster
- Pendle Vale College, comprehensive school in Nelson, Lancashire
- Pendle witches, accused in the 1612 witch trial
- Pendle Water, minor river in Lancashire
- Pendle Way, recreational path encircling the borough
- Pendle Grit, geologic formation
- George Pendle, British author and journalist

== See also ==
- Pendle Hill (disambiguation)
