= Worston =

Village in Lancashire, England

Coordinates: 53.880°N 2.353°W

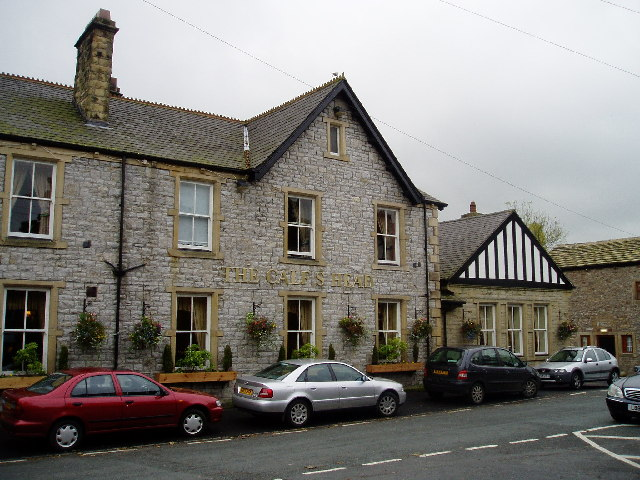
- The Calf's Head public house

- Shown within Ribble Valley Location within Lancashire
- Population: 76 (2001)
- OS grid reference: SD768427
- Civil parish: Worston
- District: Ribble Valley
- Shire county: Lancashire
- Region: North West
- Country: England
- Sovereign state: United Kingdom
- Post town: CLITHEROE
- Postcode district: BB7
- Dialling code: 01200
- Police: Lancashire
- Fire: Lancashire
- Ambulance: North West
- UK Parliament: Ribble Valley

Worston is a small linear village and civil parish in Lancashire, England. The village is north-west of Pendle Hill, east of Clitheroe, and is in the Ribble Valley district. As it is only a small village, with a population of 76 at the 2001 census, it has no parish council, but instead has a parish meeting. The parish meeting is shared with Mearley. From the 2011 Census population information for both Mearley and Worston is included within the civil parish of Pendleton.

The village has a public house "The Calf's Head". The single road that passes through the village continues as a single track road to Downham. Worston is bypassed to the west by the A59 road, which passes through the edge of the parish. Slightly further north is the route of a Roman road, which forms part of the parish boundary. The oldest building in the village, Crow Hill Cottage, is an interesting example of a late Jacobean property.

Worston was once a township in the ancient parish of Whalley. This became a civil parish in 1866, forming part of the Clitheroe Rural District from 1894 till 1974.

Along with Wiswell and Barrow (since 2015), both Mearley and Worston form the Wiswell and Pendleton ward of Ribble Valley Borough Council.

== See also ==
- Listed buildings in Worston
