= Swan with Two Necks =

Swan with Two Necks may refer to:

- Swan with Two Necks, London, a former inn in the City of London
- Swan with Two Necks, Pendleton, a pub in Lancashire, England
- Swan with Two Necks, Stockport, a pub in Greater Manchester, England
