= Listed buildings in Bashall Eaves =

Bashall Eaves is a civil parish in Ribble Valley, Lancashire, England. It contains 22 listed buildings that are recorded in the National Heritage List for England. Of these, three are at Grade II*, the middle grade, and the others are at Grade II, the lowest grade. The parish contains the village of Bashall Eaves, and is otherwise rural. The most important building in the parish is Bashall Hall; this and structures are associated with it are listed. Most of the other listed buildings are houses and associated structures, farmhouses and farm buildings. In addition, three bridges and a public house are listed.

== Key ==
Grade	Criteria
II*	Particularly important buildings of more than special interest
II	Buildings of national importance and special interest

== Buildings ==
Name and location	Photograph	Date	Notes	Grade
Bashall Hall; 53.87651°N 2.44133°W		c. 1600 (probable)	A country house in sandstone with a stone-slate roof. It has an east block that has three storeys with attics and two gables on each side, a central block with two storeys, and a two-storey west wing. Some windows are mullioned, some are mullioned and transomed, and others are sashes. The main doorway is approached by external steps. It has a moulded architrave and a broken segmental pediment, above which is a cartouche.	II*
Farm building, Bashall Hall; 53.87677°N 2.44122°W		c. 1600	The farm building is in two storeys, It is in sandstone and has a timber-framed upper storey with wattle and daub infill, and a stone-slate roof. In the south wall is a jettied timber gallery. There are various openings, some of which are blocked. These include chamfered doorways, and windows, some of which are mullioned or mullioned and transomed.	II*
Saddle Bridge (or Fairy Bridge); 53.88681°N 2.45359°W	—	17th century (possible)	The bridge crosses Bashall Brook, and was restored in 1938. It is a narrow bridge in sandstone, and consists of a single tall segmental arch with solid parapets.	II
Masons Farmhouse and barn 53.88959°N 2.47231°W	—	Late 17th century (probable)	The house and barn are in sandstone. The house has a stone-slate roof, two storeys, and two bays with an outshut. The windows are mullioned, and the doorway has a moulded surround and a shaped lintel. The barn to the left has a slate roof, and a wide entrance with a segmental arch and a fluted keystone.	II
Moss Barn Farmhouse and barn 53.87736°N 2.45959°W		Late 17th century (probable)	The house and barn are in stone with a modern tile roof. The house is pebbledashed with two storeys and two bays. The windows are mullioned, and the doorway has a roll moulded surround. The barn to the left has a wide entrance with a timber lintel and is flanked by outshuts.	II
Rugglesmire Farmhouse; 53.88598°N 2.45531°W	—	Late 17th century	A pebbledashed stone house with a stone-slate roof in two storeys and with an L-shaped plan and modern extensions. The windows are mullioned, and the doorway has a moulded surround and a shaped lintel.	II
Barn, Bashall Hall; 53.87591°N 2.44095°W		Early 18th century (probable)	The barn is in sandstone with a stone-slate roof. The openings include a wide entrance, doorways, windows, pitching holes, and ventilation slits. On the apices of the gables are re-used crocketed finials.	II
Garden pavilion, Bashall Hall; 53.87559°N 2.44183°W	—	Early 18th century	The pavilion is in sandstone and has two storeys. The northwest wall has an opening flanked by Tuscan pilasters, an entablature, and a moulded pediment with urn finials. The northeast wall contains a window and a doorway, both with architraves, and an entablature. In the southeast wall is a pediment with urn finials.	II*
Garden walls, Bashall Hall; 53.87677°N 2.44085°W		Early 18th century	The walls are in sandstone. In the north wall is a gateway with an architrave. The east wall has end piers that are rusticated and have acorn finials. In the centre is a pair of piers, each with moulded bases, cornices, and urns.	II
Paddock walls, Bashall Hall; 53.87590°N 2.44228°W	—	Early 18th century (possible)	The walls surround the four sides of the paddock. They are in sandstone, and most have triangular copings. In the east wall is a doorway with a chamfered surround, and a doorway with a moulded architrave.	II
Backridge Farmhouse and farm building 53.88041°N 2.43030°W	—	Mid 18th century	The building is in sandstone with a stone-slate roof in two storeys with attics. The house has four bays, sash windows, and a doorway that has an architrave with a moulded dentilled cornice. To the right is a single-storey bay with a mullioned window. Attached to the left is a farm building containing cross windows and a pitching door. (Note: Street View in May 2011 shows that the farm building has been converted into domestic use and incorporated in the house)	II
Barn, Rugglesmire Farm; 53.88614°N 2.45467°W	—	1753	The barn is in sandstone with a slate roof. There is a wide entrance on the front with a segmental head and long-and-short jambs, and a pitching hole. Also on the front is a lean-to and there are more at the rear. The barn has a porch with its roof carried on a series of corbels.	II
Red Pump Inn and pump 53.88387°N 2.46425°W		1756	A public house to which a wing was added in the late 18th century, both wings having two storeys. The earlier wing has a stone-slate roof, and a south front of one bay with modern windows and a doorway with a plain surround. The later wing is pebbledashed with an imitation slate roof, quoins, and sash windows. On the front of the earlier wing is a pump with an iron handle and a lead spout.	II
Cheetall Farmhouse; 53.87317°N 2.42843°W	—	Late 18th century (probable)	The house is in sandstone with a stone-slate roof, and has two storeys and three bays. The windows are mullioned, and on the front is a gabled porch. The doorway has an architrave.	II
Clough Bottom Farmhouse; 53.88877°N 2.45679°W	—	Late 18th century	A sandstone house with a blue slate roof, in two storeys and two bays. The central doorway and the windows have plain surrounds, and the windows are mullioned.	II
Talbot Bridge House; 53.89337°N 2.45684°W	—	Late 18th century	A pebbledashed stone house with a stone-slate roof. It has two storeys and two bays. The central doorway has a plain surround, and the three-light windows are mullioned.	II
Braddup House and farm building 53.89351°N 2.44019°W		1787	The house and farm building are in sandstone with a slate roof and mullioned windows. The house has two storeys and three bays. The doorway has a plain surround, and above it is an inscribed plaque. To the right is a one-bay farm building that contains a stair window with two transoms, and a re-set shaped inscribed lintel.	II
South Lodge, Browsholme Hall and wall with gateways 53.89837°N 2.47949°W		1806	The lodge incorporates items from other sites. It is in sandstone with a stone-slate roof, in two storeys and two bays. The windows are mullioned, and on the gables are ball finials. In the west gable is a doorway with a moulded surround and a re-set shaped inscribed lintel, above which is a coat of arms. To the west of the lodge is a wall containing two gateways with wrought iron gates. One has a semicircular head, and the other a moulded segmental arch, coats of arms, and ball finials.	II
Bridge, Bashall Hall; 53.87697°N 2.44095°W	—	Early 19th century (possible)	The bridge carries Twitter Lane over Bashall Brook. It is in sandstone, and consists of a single segmental arch. The bridge has solid parapets and flat copings.	II
Wetters Bridge; 53.88359°N 2.42398°W		Early 19th century (possible)	The bridge carries Twitter Lane over Bashall Brook. It is in sandstone, and consists of a single segmental arch with end piers and a solid parapet. The west parapet has inscriptions indicating the directions of Bashall Eaves and Waddington.	II
Talbot Bridge; 53.89322°N 2.45613°W		Early to mid 19th century	The bridge carries Cross Lane over Bashall Brook. It is in sandstone, and consists of a single segmental arch with rounded parapets.	II
Lodge Gate; 53.87678°N 2.46198°W		Mid 19th century	An entrance lodge in sandstone with a hipped slate roof. It is in a single storey and has fronts of two bays. The windows are sashes with plain surrounds and semicircular heads. The doorway also has a plain surround.	II

== Notes and references ==
=== Sources ===
- Historic England, "Bashall Hall, Bashall Eaves (1072193)", National Heritage List for England
- Historic England, "Farm building 12 metres north of Bashall Hall, Bashall Eaves (1362282)", National Heritage List for England
- Historic England, "Saddle Bridge (or Fairy Bridge), 130 metres northeast of Rugglesmire Farmhouse, Bashall Eaves (1072199)", National Heritage List for England
- Historic England, "Masons Farmhouse and barn adjoining to south-west, Bashall Eaves (1163094)", National Heritage List for England
- Historic England, "Moss Barn Farmhouse and barn adjoining to the south-east, Bashall Eaves (1072198)", National Heritage List for England
- Historic England, "Rugglesmire Farmhouse, Bashall Eaves (1362285)", National Heritage List for England
- Historic England, "Barn approximately 60 metres south Bashall Hall, Bashall Eaves (1362281)", National Heritage List for England
- Historic England, "Garden pavilion, approximately 90 metres south of Bashall Hall, Bashall Eaves (1072195)", National Heritage List for England
- Historic England, "Walls on north and west side of garden to east of Bashall Hall, Bashall Eaves (1072196)", National Heritage List for England
- Historic England, "Walls on north, south, east and west side of paddock to south of Bashall Hall, Bashall Eaves (1163056)", National Heritage List for England
- Historic England, "Backridge Farmhouse and farm building adjoining to southwest, Bashall Eaves (1072192)", National Heritage List for England
- Historic England, "Barn, 28 metres north-east of farmhouse, Rugglesmire Farm, Bashall Eaves (1163118)", National Heritage List for England
- Historic England, "Red Pump Inn and pump attached to south wall of north wing, Bashall Eaves (1163100)", National Heritage List for England
- Historic England, "Cheetall Farmhouse, Bashall Eaves (1309348)", National Heritage List for England
- Historic England, "Clough Bottom Farmhouse, Bashall Eaves (1072197)", National Heritage List for England
- Historic England, "Talbot Bridge House, Bashall Eaves (1072191)", National Heritage List for England
- Historic England, "Braddup House and farm building adjoining to west, Bashall Eaves (1362283)", National Heritage List for England
- Historic England, "South (Front) Lodge, Browsholme Hall and wall to west containing 2 gateways with gates, Bashall Eaves (1163123)", National Heritage List for England
- Historic England, "Bridge approximately 15 metres north of farm building to north of Bashall Hall, Bashall Eaves (1072194)", National Heritage List for England
- Historic England, "Wetters Bridge, Bashall Eaves (1072200)", National Heritage List for England
- Historic England, "Talbot Bridge, Bashall Eaves (1362280)", National Heritage List for England
- Historic England, "Lodge Gate, Bashall Eaves (1362284)", National Heritage List for England
- Historic England, Listed Buildings
