= Listed buildings in Worston =

Worston is a civil parish in Ribble Valley, Lancashire, England. It contains three listed buildings that are recorded in the National Heritage List for England. All of the listed buildings are designated at Grade II, the lowest of the three grades, which is applied to "buildings of national importance and special interest". The parish include the small village of Worston and surrounding countryside. The listed buildings consist of two houses and a garden wall.

== Buildings ==
Name and location	Photograph	Date	Notes
Crow Hill Cottage; 53.88090°N 2.35331°W	—	circa 1620 late Jacobean)	A stone house with a stone-slate roof, in two storeys. The oldest part is to the south, with a gable facing the road, and the later extension to the north is lower. The windows and doors have plain surrounds, and some of the windows are sashes. Inside the house is a wall containing wattle and daub.
Worston Old Hall; 53.88019°N 2.35174°W		19th century (possible)	A sandstone house, mainly pebbledashed, with a stone-slate roof, in two storeys. It is possible that the house incorporates earlier material. On the front is a two-storey gabled porch with a plain doorway, above which are three carved shields and a two-light mullioned window. The ground floor windows flanking the porch have three lights and mullions, the outer lights being fixed. The other windows are sashes with plain surrounds.
Wall, Worston Old Hall; 53.88007°N 2.35173°W	—	Uncertain	The wall encloses the garden to the south of the house. It is in a mixture of sandstone and limestone, and contains fragments of medieval dressed sandstone. Also included in the wall is a moulded Tudor arched doorhead and part of its hood mould. In the wall is an entrance with moulded jambs.
