= Listed buildings in Pendleton, Lancashire =

Pendleton is a civil parish in Ribble Valley, Lancashire, England. It contains 18 listed buildings that are recorded in the National Heritage List for England. Of these, one is at Grade II*, the middle grade, and the others are at Grade II, the lowest grade. The parish contains the village of Pendleton, and is otherwise rural. All the listed buildings are houses and associated structures, or farmhouses and farm buildings, either in the village, or in the surrounding area.

== Key ==
Grade	Criteria
II*	Particularly important buildings of more than special interest
II	Buildings of national importance and special interest

== Buildings ==
Name and location	Photograph	Date	Notes	Grade
Spring House Farmhouse and barn 53.85157°N 2.37071°W	—	Early 17th century	The house and barn are in sandstone. The house has a roof of imitation stone slate, and is in two storeys. The windows are mullioned, and the doorway has a plain surround. The attached barn dates probably from the early 19th century, it has a stone-slate roof, and contains a wide entrance with voussoirs and a window.	II
No.2 Wymondhouses; 53.84492°N 2.35900°W		Late 17th century	The house is in sandstone with a stone-slate roof, and has two storeys and three bays. One of the windows is mullioned, with the others and the doorway having chamfered surrounds. Above the doorway is an inscribed plaque.	II
Hayhurst Cottage and Farmhouse; 53.85207°N 2.37257°W	—	Late 17th century (probable)	Originally one house, later divided into two dwellings, they are in sandstone with a slate roof, and have two storeys. The cottage, on the left, has one bay, and contains mullioned windows. The house has three bays, and contains a doorway with a plain surround. Most of the windows are sashes, those in the upper floor having flat lintels with false voussoirs and fluted false keystones.	II
Bulcock's Farmhouse; 53.85242°N 2.37413°W	—	1693	The house is pebbledashed with a slate roof, and has two storeys. On the front facing the road is a late lean-to. The windows are of various types, and include mullioned and sash windows. Above a ground floor window is a hood containing an inscribed plaque.	II
Town Head; 53.85105°N 2.37021°W	—	Early 18th century	A sandstone house with a slate roof in two storeys and five bays. The front is flanked by Corinthian pilasters, and has a dentilled cornice. The windows are sashes with architraves. The central doorway has pilasters, an architrave, a carved frieze, a dentilled cornice, and an open segmental pediment. To the left are two lower bays with chamfered quoins.	II
Coach house and stables, Town Head; 53.85119°N 2.36986°W	—	Early 18th century	The coach house and stables have been converted for other purposes. They are in sandstone with a stone-slate roof. The coach house has chamfered quoins, a wide entrance with an elliptical arch and a fluted keystone, an oculus, and two rows of ventilation slits. The stables have two doorways with architraves and mullioned windows.	II
Gate piers, Town Head; 53.85140°N 2.36994°W		Early 18th century	The gate piers are in sandstone and have a square plan. They have Tuscan pilasters on the north and south sides, and moulded cornices. Each pier has an acorn finial bisected by an abacus.	II
Dickinson Farmhouse and barn 53.85189°N 2.36934°W		Mid 18th century	The building is in sandstone. The house has a tiled roof and two storeys, and was originally in three bays, with a central doorway and mullioned window. To the left is a one-bay extension with sash windows. To the right of the house is a barn with a stone-slate roof, containing a wide entrance, and to its right is a protruding shippon.	II
Standen Hall; 53.85804°N 2.38553°W		1757	A country house built on the site of an earlier house, with the west wing rebuilt in about 1858. It is in Palladian style, constructed in sandstone with slate roofs, with a symmetrical east front in three storeys and seven bays. The central three bays of the ground floor project forward with giant Doric columns carrying an entablature with a triglyph frieze and a dentilled moulded pediment. The windows are sashes with architraves. The central doorway has Tuscan pilasters, a semicircular head, and a pediment on console brackets. There are additional wings and blocks.	II*
Dock Hillock and barn 53.85159°N 2.37245°W		Late 18th century	The house and barn are in sandstone with a stone-slate roof. The house has two storeys and two bays. The central doorway has a plain surround, and the windows are sashes. The barn to the right has a wide entrance with a canopy, and a timber lintel above which is an inscribed plaque.	II
Town Farmhouse; 53.85182°N 2.37020°W		Late 18th century	The house is in sandstone with a slate roof, and has two storeys and a symmetrical three-bay front flanked by pilaster strips. The central doorway has Tuscan pilasters, a broken fluted entablature, and a semicircular fanlight under an open pediment. The windows are sashes, all with plain surrounds except for the middle window in the upper floor that has an architrave.	II
Gate piers, Town Farmhouse; 53.85166°N 2.37021°W	—	Late 18th century	The gate piers are in sandstone and have a square plan. Each pier has a bracketed cornice and an acorn finial bisected by an abacus.	II
Wymondhouses Farmhouse; 53.84445°N 2.36048°W		1788	A sandstone house with a slate roof, in two storeys and two bays. On the front is a single-storey gabled porch. The windows have three lights and are mullioned. Above the doorway is an inscribed plaque.	II
Cold Coats Farmhouse; 53.84139°N 2.37420°W		c. 1800	The house contains material dating from about 1600. It is in sandstone with a slate roof, and has two storeys and three bays. In the central bay is a single-storey gabled porch containing sash windows. The other windows are mullioned. At the rear is a stair window with a transom.	II
Lower Standen Farmhouse; 53.86049°N 2.39899°W	—	Early 19th century	A pebbledashed stone house with a modern tile roof, in two storeys and two bays. The central doorway has a plain surround. To its left is a two-storey bow window and to the right is a single-storey bow window. All the windows are sashes.	II
Mounting block 53.85758°N 2.38564°W		Early 19th century (possible)	The mounting block is in the grounds of Standen Hall. It is in sandstone and is symmetrical, with six steps on each side.	II
Stork House; 53.85141°N 2.37145°W		1840	A sandstone house with a stone-slate roof, in two storeys. It has a one-bay gabled front facing the road. This contains two three-light mullioned windows, and a doorway with a chamfered surround and a hood. In the gable is an inscribed plaque with an ogee head.	II
Schofield Farmhouse; 53.85185°N 2.37201°W	—	Mid 19th century	The house is in sandstone with a slate roof, in two storeys and three bays. Most of the windows are mullioned and they contain sashes. The central doorway has a chamfered surround, a triangular head, and a hood.	II
