= Alan Fletcher (footballer) =

English footballer

Personal information
- Full name: Alan Frederick Fletcher
- Date of birth: 28 October 1917
- Place of birth: Pendleton, Clitheroe, England
- Date of death: 1984 (aged 66)
- Place of death: Harefield, England
- Height: 5 ft 10 in (1.78 m)
- Position: Striker

Senior career*
Years	Team	Apps	(Gls)
1937–1938	Blackpool	0	(0)
1937–1938	Port Vale	0	(0)
1938–1939	Bournemouth	12	(0)
1939	Bristol Rovers	0	(0)
1947	Crewe Alexandra	1	(0)
1947–1949	Mossley		
1949–1950	Sligo Rovers		
1950–1951	Mossley		

Managerial career
- 1949–1950: Sligo Rovers
- 1950–1951: Mossley
- * Club domestic league appearances and goals

Alan Frederick Fletcher (28 October 1917 – 1984) was an English professional footballer. He played in the Football League for Bournemouth and Crewe Alexandra.

Fletcher joined Blackpool in January 1937, later joining Port Vale without appearing for either side. He moved to Bournemouth, playing twelve times during the 1938–39 season. He joined Bristol Rovers in 1939, playing all three games before World War II stopped League football in England.

He joined Crewe Alexandra in September 1947. He made just one appearance before joining Mossley as a player-coach. He left Mossley to become player-coach with Irish side Sligo Rovers at the start of the 1949–50 season. He returned to Mossley as player-manager in August 1950. Mossley struggled in the Cheshire League under Fletcher, and he was sacked in May 1951.

== Career statistics ==
Appearances and goals by club, season and competition
Club	Season	League			FA Cup		Other		Total	
Club	Season	Division	Apps	Goals	Apps	Goals	Apps	Goals	Apps	Goals
Blackpool	1937–38	Second Division	0	0	0	0	0	0	0	0
Port Vale	1937–38	Third Division South	0	0	0	0	0	0	0	0
Bournemouth	1938–39	Third Division South	12	0	2	1	0	0	14	1
Bristol Rovers	1939–40	–	0	0	0	0	3	0	3	0
Crewe Alexandra	1947–48	Third Division North	1	0	0	0	0	0	1	0
