= Pendelfin =

Pendelfin is a company specializing in handcrafted and handpainted stoneware based in Burnley, Lancashire, England. It has a very large fan club which covers Europe, North America and Australia. It was started by Jean Walmsley Heap and Jeannie Todd in the early 1950s and went on to be a thriving business. It was originally started as a hobby for making presents for family but quickly gained worldwide fame. It got the name from a hill near Burnley called Pendle Hill, which is famous for tales of witches and ghouls. As a result, the first model produced by the company was named the Pendle Witch. Many figures are now fetching thousands of pounds.
