= Listed buildings in Mearley =

Mearley is a civil parish in Ribble Valley, Lancashire, England. It contains three listed buildings that are recorded in the National Heritage List for England. Of these, one is at Grade II*, the middle grade, and the others are at Grade II, the lowest grade. The parish is entirely rural, and the listed buildings consist of three dwellings.

== Key ==
Grade	Criteria
II*	Particularly important buildings of more than special interest
II	Buildings of national importance and special interest

== Buildings ==
Name and location	Photograph	Date	Notes	Grade
Little Mearley Hall; 53.87031°N 2.34322°W		Late 16th century	A house in sandstone, mostly pebbledashed, with a roof partly in slate and partly in stone-slate. There are two storeys and an attic, and a main range and a cross wing. The windows are in varying types; some are mullioned, and some contain sashes or casements. There is a two-storey bay window that was formerly in Sawley Abbey. One doorway has a plain surround, another has a moulded surround and a Tudor arched head, and above it is an inscribed plaque.	II*
Great Mearley Cottage; 53.86291°N 2.35215°W	—	Late 17th century	The house is in pebbledashed stone with a stone-slate roof, and has two storeys and three bays. The windows are mullioned, and the doorway has a chamfered surround. Above the doorway is a blank plaque.	II
Lane Side Farmhouse; 53.86622°N 2.35124°W	—	Late 18th century	A sandstone house with a slate roof, in two storeys and two bays. The windows are mullioned with plain surrounds, and the entrance is at the rear through a single-storey porch.	II
