= Pendleton, Lancashire =

Village in Lancashire, England

Coordinates: 53.851°N 2.371°W

Pendleton
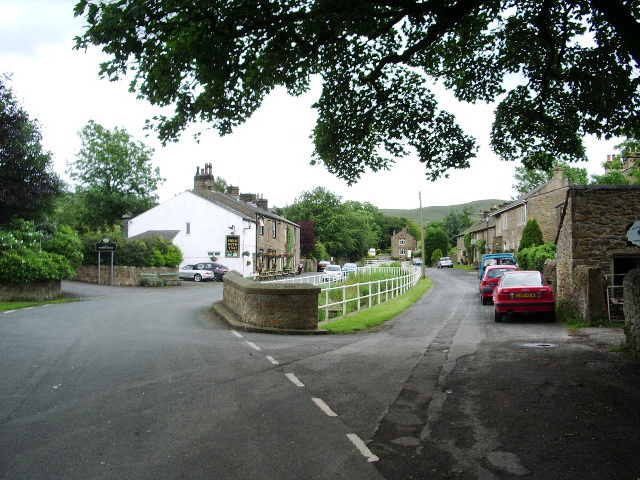
- Pendleton

- Shown within Ribble Valley Location within Lancashire
- Population: 203 (2001)
- OS grid reference: SD756395
- Civil parish: Pendleton
- District: Ribble Valley
- Shire county: Lancashire
- Region: North West
- Country: England
- Sovereign state: United Kingdom
- Post town: CLITHEROE
- Postcode district: BB7
- Dialling code: 01200
- Police: Lancashire
- Fire: Lancashire
- Ambulance: North West
- UK Parliament: Ribble Valley

Pendleton is a small village and civil parish in Ribble Valley, within the county of Lancashire, England. It is close to the towns of Whalley and Clitheroe. The parish lies on the north west side of Pendle Hill below the Nick o' Pendle. The village is just off the A59, Liverpool to York main road, since the construction of the Clitheroe by-pass. Older roads through the parish include one from Clitheroe to Whalley which passes through the Standen area and another to Burnley which passes Pendleton Hall.

Pendleton Brook runs down the centre of Main Street in the village. The village pub, the Swan with Two Necks, won the Campaign for Real Ale's (CAMRA) national Pub of the Year award in 2013.

According to the 2001 census, the parish had a population of 203; however, the United Kingdom Census 2011 grouped the parish with Mearley and Worston (2001 pop. 25 and 76), giving a total of 349.

The parish adjoins the other Ribble Valley parishes of Clitheroe, Mearley, Sabden, Wiswell, Barrow and Little Mitton. Higher areas of the parish, west of the village, are part of the Forest of Bowland Area of Outstanding Natural Beauty (AONB).

== History ==
The brief details of the Blackburnshire Hundred in the Domesday survey, mention Pendleton with King Edward holding half a hide of land here.

Wymondhouses (an old farm in the south of the parish) was purchased in 1667 by the Nonconformist preacher Thomas Jollie. He had a meeting-place licensed in 1672, later building a chapel that was still in-use until the 1860s.

Pendleton also has an interesting history related to traditional folk customs and the witchcraft persecutions. A book was written on this subject entitled The Pendle Witches by William Harrison Ainsworth, published 1849. Doreen McGlashan, born Doreen Wilson, a Pendleton native, stated that as a child in the 1920s there was frequent talk of witches and witchcraft in the village, and that she and her siblings were kept indoors on certain Saturdays because of "witches Sabbaths" happening in the town on those days. She also recounts large May Day celebrations in her youth which included dancing around a maypole, and states that as a girl she specifically remembers "pretty girls" often being suspected of witchcraft by the villagers.

== Governance ==
Pendleton was once a township in the ancient parish of Whalley. This became a civil parish in 1866, forming part of the Clitheroe Rural District from 1894. Parts of the parish transferred to Sabden on its creation in 1904, (Note: The old township shared a boundary with Read at Sabden Brook.) however the area around Coldcoats was added in 1935. Since 1974 it has formed part of the Borough of Ribble Valley.

Along with Wiswell, Barrow (since 2015), Mearley and Worston, the parish forms the Wiswell and Pendleton ward of Ribble Valley Borough Council.

== Notable people ==
- Dick Crawshaw, Baron Crawshaw of Aintree (1917–1986), was born and lived here until 1940
- Nigel Evans, former Conservative Party Member of Parliament for the constituency which covers the village, live in the village
- Alan Fletcher (1917–1984), professional footballer, was born in Pendleton Actor, Albert Finney, born Pendleton 1936 raised Salford, Lancashire

== Media gallery ==
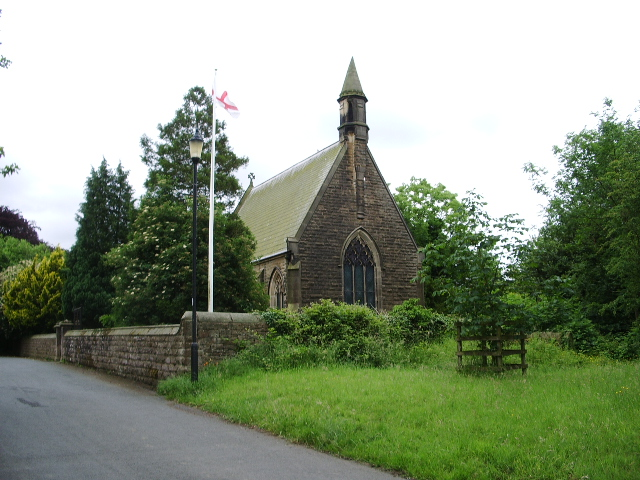
All Saints' Church, built in 1847, consecrated in 1872.

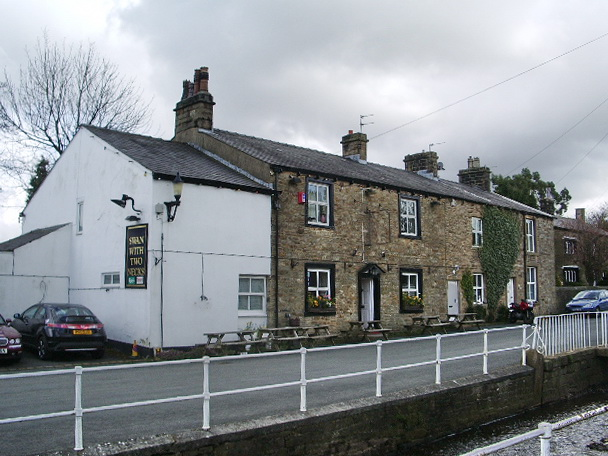
Swan with Two Necks and Pendleton Brook.

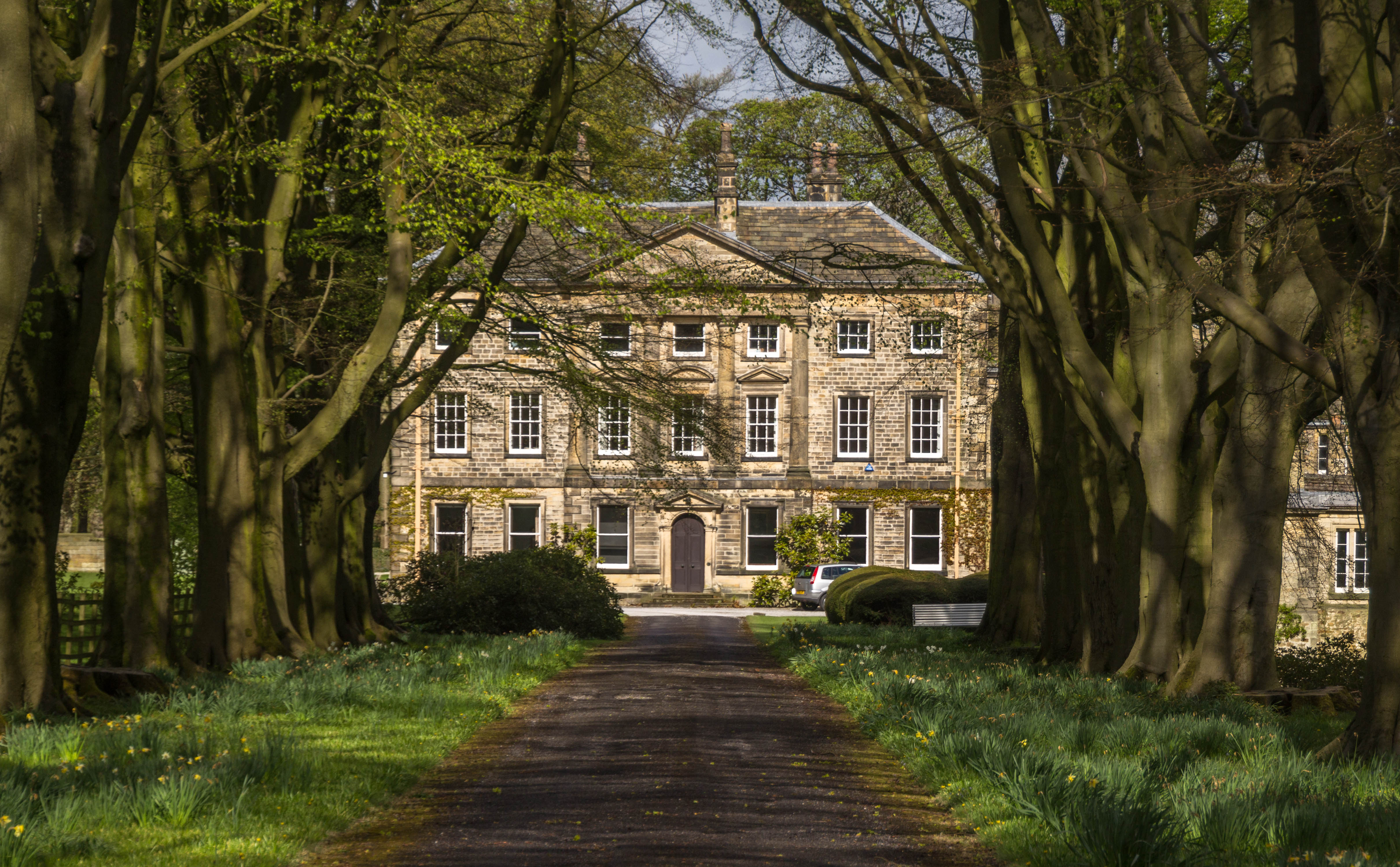
Standen Hall, on the western side of the parish near Clitheroe.

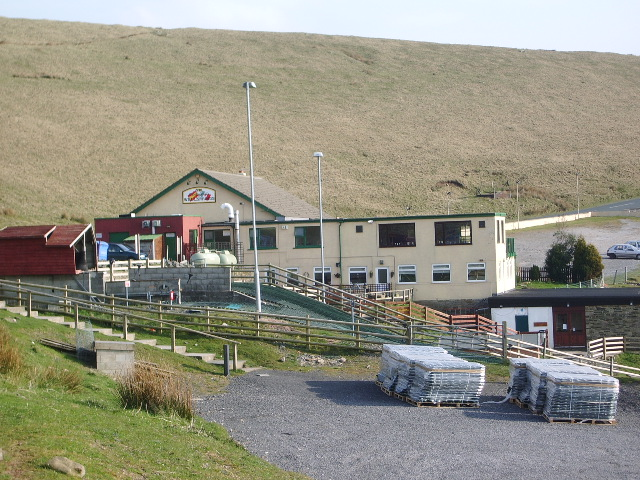
Well Springs Restaurant and Pendle Ski Club on Clitheroe Road.

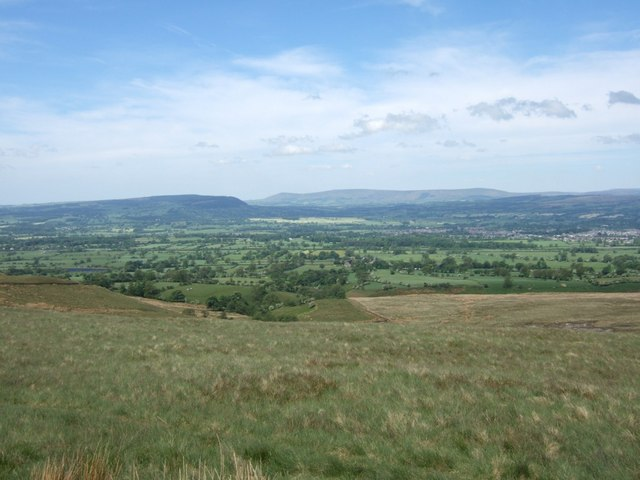
View from Pendleton Moor, looking north across the Ribble valley.

== See also ==
- Listed buildings in Pendleton, Lancashire
