= Trutex =

School uniform supplier

Trutex Ltd is a school uniform supplier based in Clitheroe, Lancashire. The business has been manufacturing and supplying uniforms for over 150 years and is the United Kingdom's first Carbon Neutral specialist schoolwear provider. Trutex is a member of the Schoolwear Association.

== History ==
Established in 1865 as Clitheroe Shirtings Ltd, the company weaved fabrics for nearby businesses, and in 1900 started to produce school uniform items after an increase in the number of schools introducing uniform. In 1920, the company was purchased by W. H. Charnley, with its head office based in Grindleton, which was the company's headquarters for the next 70 years. The brand name 'Trutex' was introduced in the mid 1920s; it became so popular that the company changed its name to Trutex in 1965.

In the late 1960s, the company was floated on the stock exchange. The business, then owned by Tootal Broadhurst Lee started to move production overseas. Trutex was then taken over by Coats Viyella in the late 1980s. During the 1990s the business failed to meet demand of their core garments and the company made a loss for the first time. It was in 1992 that Trutex head office moved to its now current location of Jubilee Mill, Clitheroe.

Trutex went through a management buyout in 2005. After another five years the business was acquired by investment company Endless LLP in 2010. Expansion has since taken place through the introduction of new brands such as AKOA sportswear in 2011 and the acquisition of John Hall Schoolwear in 2013 which saw Trutex return to UK manufacturing for the first time in over a decade.

== Organisation ==
Trutex employs over 120 people at their head office and offshore which supplies uniform across the UK and internationally. Trutex celebrated its 150th anniversary in 2015.
