= Bashall Brook =

Minor river in Lancashire, England

Coordinates: 53.8701°N 2.4157°W

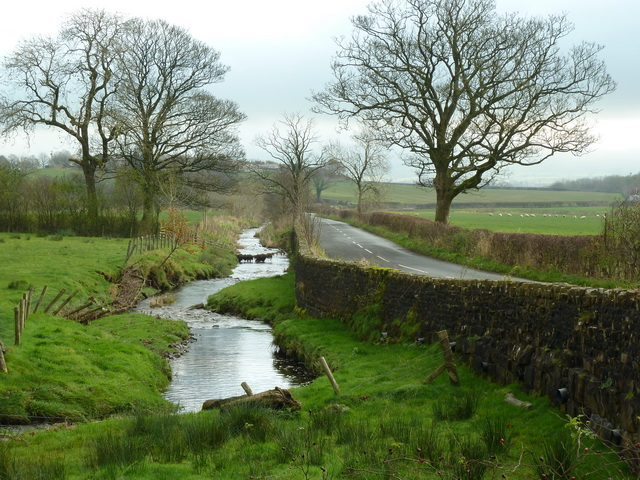
Bashall Brook and the road to Clitheroe

Bashall Brook is a minor river in Lancashire, England. It is 7.09 miles (11.41 km) long and has a catchment area of 6.86 square miles (1,777.68 ha).

The stream rises at Browsholme Tarn on Browsholme Moor descending through Braddup Clough where it collects Elm Clough and flows south and east past Bashall Eaves, meeting Cow Hey Brook before turning northeast to collect Hollins Clough near Back Ridge Farm. It again turns south, passing the Shireburn Caravan Park at Waddington before joining the River Ribble at the Low Moor area of Clitheroe.

Next confluence upstream	River Ribble	Next confluence downstream
Skirden Beck (North)	Bashall Brook	Pendleton Brook (South)
