= Swan with Two Necks, Pendleton =

Pub in Lancashire, England

Swan with Two Necks
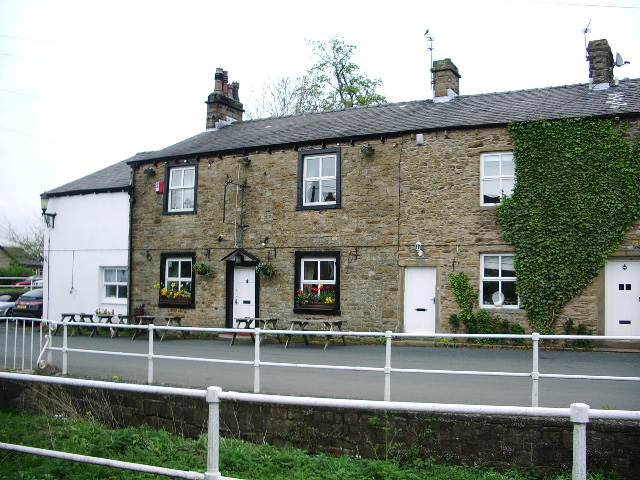
- The pub in 2007

- Location within Lancashire

General information
- Type: Public house
- Location: Main Street, Pendleton, Lancashire, England
- Coordinates: 53.8522°N 2.3728°W

Website
- www.swanwithtwonecks.co.uk

The Swan with Two Necks is a pub on Main Street in Pendleton, a village near Clitheroe, Lancashire, England.

It was CAMRA's National Pub of the Year for 2014.
