= Mearley Brook =

River in Lancashire, England

Coordinates: 53.8725°N 2.3561°W

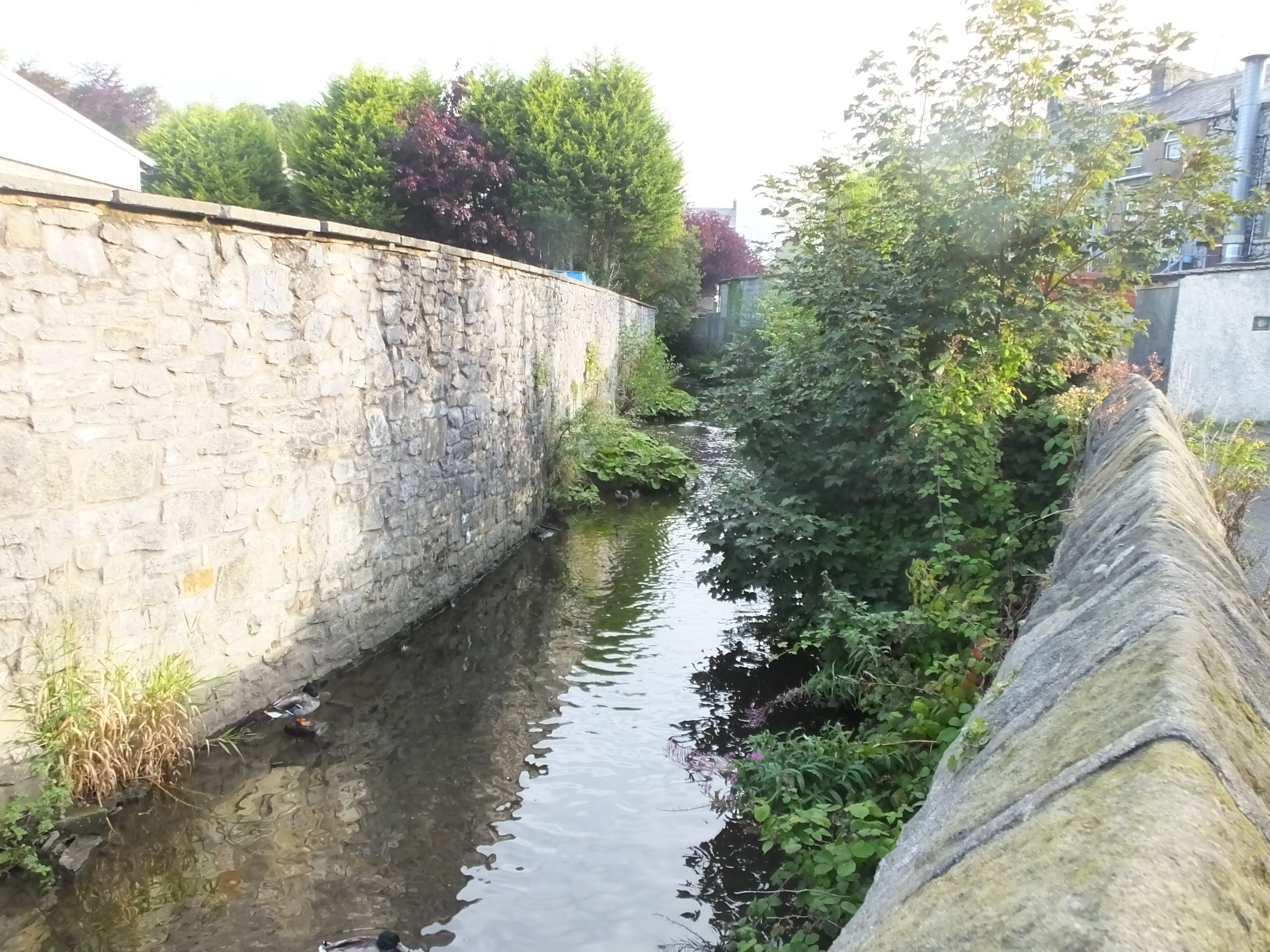
Mearley Brook at Clitheroe

Mearley Brook is a minor river in Lancashire, England. It is approximately 4.5 miles (7.2 km) long and has a catchment area of 8.79 square miles (22.77 km^{2}). (Note: Measured using mapping website.)

The stream rises on Pendle Hill and heads northwest, descending through Mearley Clough, passing Little Mearley Hall and crossing under the A59 Clitheroe Bypass. Close to Upbrooks Farm it is met by Worston Brook and turns to the southeast. Nearby it met by a small brook from Bracken Hey and the culvert of another at the Waterloo Bridge, as it enters the centre of Clitheroe. At the Shaw Bridge it is joined by Shaw Brook and continues to the east of the hill topped by Clitheroe Castle. In the south of the town, the river flows into the mill lodge of the old Primrose Mill and then into Pendleton Brook nearby at Lower Standen Hey, just before that river joins the River Ribble.

Mearley (also the name of the civil parish where the river begins) is thought to be from the Old English mǣre lēah, meaning the meadow or clearing at the boundary. Brook (OE broc) is a common name for a stream, most often found in southern and central England.
