= Clayton, Goodfellow & Co. Ltd =

Manufacturers of stationary engines

Clayton, Goodfellow and Co (sometimes Clayton & Goodfellow) of Blackburn, Lancashire, England, were manufacturers of Stationary engines.

The company was incorporated on 9 September 1897 and remains legally extant, with company number 00054026.
