= Pendle Hill (China, Maine) =

Historic house in Maine, United States

- U.S. National Register of Historic Places
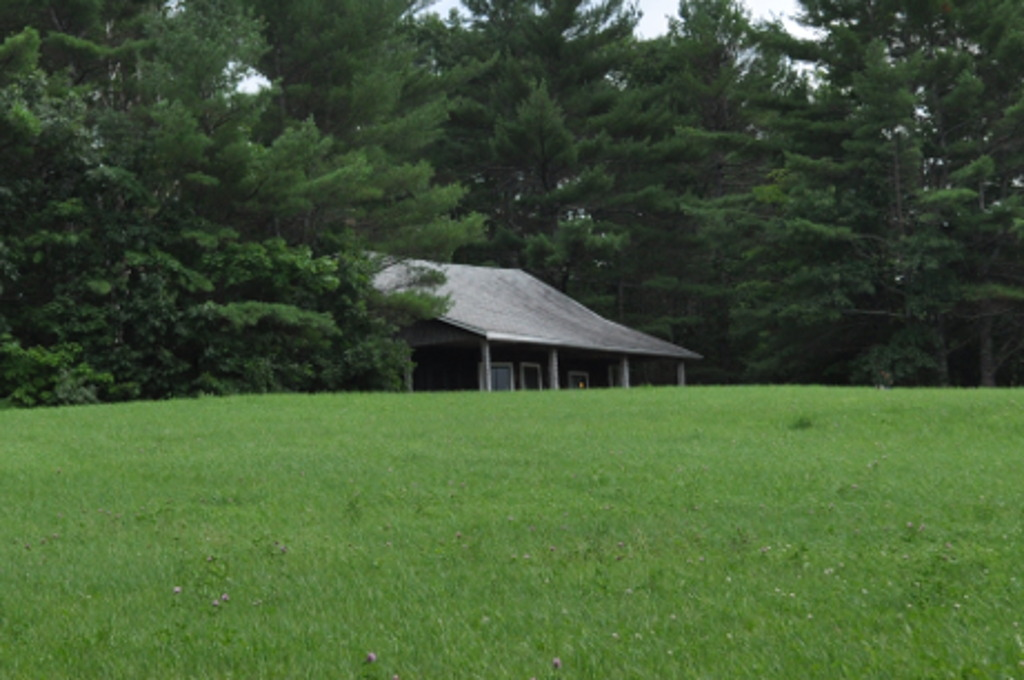

- Location within Maine Location within the United States
- Location: Off US 202, China, Maine
- Coordinates: 44°24′37″N 69°33′48″W
- Area: 1.5 acres (0.61 ha)
- Built: 1909
- Built by: Marr, George
- Architect: Jones, Rufus
- MPS: Rufus Jones TR
- NRHP reference No.: 83000457
- Added to NRHP: August 4, 1983

Pendle Hill is a historic summer house between United States Route 202 and China Lake in South China, Maine. Built in 1916, it served as the summer home of Quaker theologian, historian, and writer Rufus Jones until his death in 1948. The property was listed on the National Register of Historic Places in 1983.

== Description and history ==
Pendle Hill is located on the crest of a low ridge paralleling both US 202 and the southeastern shore of China Lake, north of the village of South China. The house itself is set on the edge of a small wooded area, with a view down the west side of the ridge toward the lake, across a cleared meadow. The meadow is separated from the lake by a wooded area. The house is a modest 1 1/2-story Shingle style structure, with a gable roof that changes pitch to extend on the west side over a porch, with shingled square posts for support. The interior is finished in stained pine, and is modestly styled, with exposed roof trusses.

Pendle Hill was built beginning in 1909 for writer Rufus Jones, who grew up in South China, and was drawn to the place as a regular summer retreat. The house was designed by Jones and built by George Marr, a local contractor, whose work was apparently substandard. Jones and his brother Herbert continued to work on the house after Marr's involvement ended, making repairs and improvements to it. The interior is largely in the same condition as it was upon Jones' death in 1948.

== See also ==
- National Register of Historic Places listings in Kennebec County, Maine
