= Barrow, Lancashire =

Village and civil parish in Lancashire, England

Coordinates: 53.841°N 2.400°W

Barrow
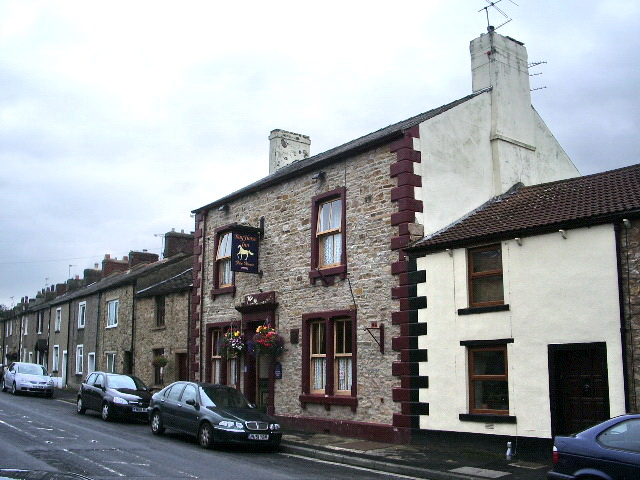
- Bay Horse public house, Barrow

- Shown within Ribble Valley Location within Lancashire
- OS grid reference: SD736384
- Civil parish: Barrow
- District: Ribble Valley
- Shire county: Lancashire
- Region: North West
- Country: England
- Sovereign state: United Kingdom
- Post town: CLITHEROE
- Postcode district: BB7
- Dialling code: 01254
- Police: Lancashire
- Fire: Lancashire
- Ambulance: North West
- UK Parliament: Ribble Valley

Barrow is a village and civil parish in the Ribble Valley district in Lancashire, England, situated between Whalley and Clitheroe and bypassed by the A59. It has a primary school and two parks. The village is well served by six local bus routes, giving direct access to many parts of Lancashire. New development has taken place in the area between Whalley Road (the former route of the A59) and the bypass.

Barrow is the birthplace of Lancashire and England cricketer Cyril Washbrook, and there are two streets in the village in his name.

On Whiteacrel Lane in Barrow, a boys' school camp was erected by the National Camps Corporation, following the enactment of the Camps Act in 1939. The school later became a girl's boarding school. Falling role numbers, finally led to Whiteacre Lane Boarding School's closure in July 1980. The school then became an over-55's residential complex, named Green Park Court Apartments, which was opened in October 1988 by the Mayor of Ribble Valley, Councillor Albert Atkinson.

According to the United Kingdom Census 2011, 646 people lived in the built-up area of Barrow village.

Barrow Parish Council came into existence on 1st April 2015, previously the village was in Wiswell civil parish.

Along with Wiswell, Pendleton, Mearley and Worston, the parish forms the Wiswell and Pendleton ward of Ribble Valley Borough Council.
