= Pendle Grit =

- Stratigraphic range: Carboniferous
- Type: Formation

Location
- Region: England
- Country: United Kingdom

The Pendle Grit is a geologic formation in England. It is a coarse Carboniferous age sandstone assigned to the Millstone Grit Group, and preserves fossils dating back to the Carboniferous period. The formation takes its name from Pendle Hill in Lancashire where it forms the sloping plateau summit.

== See also ==
- List of fossiliferous stratigraphic units in England
