= Pendleton Brook =

River in Lancashire, England

Coordinates: 53.8569°N 2.4200°W

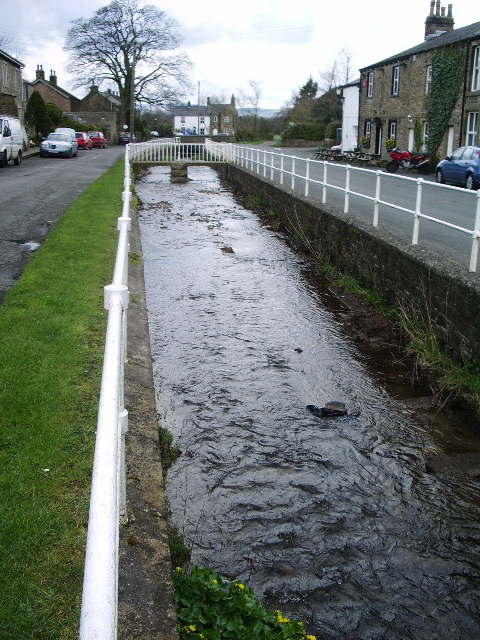
Pendleton Brook passing through Pendleton

Pendleton Brook is a small river in Lancashire. The brook rises on Pendleton Moor and flows through the village of Pendleton, travelling north west to Higher Standen, then west past Standen Hall. From there, Pendleton Brook flows south of Clitheroe before meeting the River Ribble near Siddows.

== Tributaries ==
Mearley Brook moves west from Worston Moor to Clitheroe, where it is joined by Worston Brook (coming from Worston and itself fed by Rad Brook, which drains Downham Moor) and turns south through the town of Clitheroe, in which it is joined by Shaw Brook (draining the south side of High Moor). Mearley Brook continues, feeding a reservoir at Primrose before joining Pendleton Brook south of Clitheroe.

Howcroft Brook flows south through Ashendean Clough beneath Pendle Moor and skirts round the south of Mearley Moor before moving westwards, meeting Pendleton Brook just before the latter reaches Higher Standen.

Next confluence upstream	River Ribble	Next confluence downstream
Bashall Brook (North)	Pendleton Brook	River Hodder (North)
