= Wiswell =

Village in Lancashire, England

Coordinates: 53.833°N 2.388°W

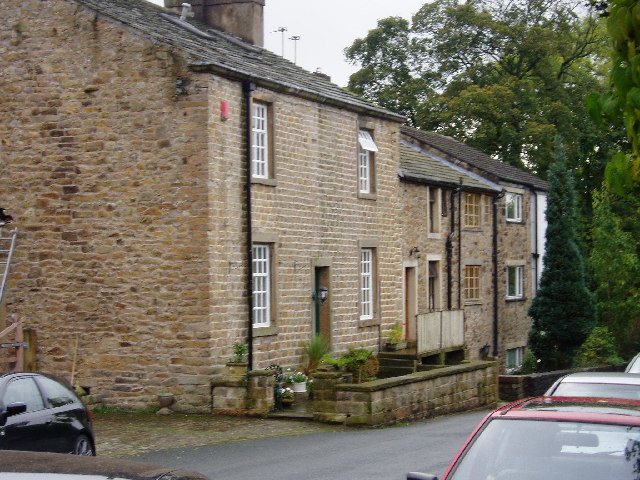
- Wiswell village

- Shown within Ribble Valley Location within Lancashire
- Population: 967 (Parish 2011)
- OS grid reference: SD745375
- Civil parish: Wiswell
- District: Ribble Valley
- Shire county: Lancashire
- Region: North West
- Country: England
- Sovereign state: United Kingdom
- Post town: CLITHEROE
- Postcode district: BB7
- Dialling code: 01254
- Police: Lancashire
- Fire: Lancashire
- Ambulance: North West
- UK Parliament: Ribble Valley

Wiswell is a small village and civil parish in the Ribble Valley, Lancashire, England, close to Whalley and Clitheroe at the foot of Wiswell Moor.

At the 2011 Census, it had a population of 967.

The parish adjoins the other Ribble Valley parishes of Pendleton, Sabden, Whalley and Barrow. Higher areas of the parish, east of the village, are part of the Forest of Bowland Area of Outstanding Natural Beauty (AONB).

== Toponymy ==
The name Wiswell is commonly spoken as wizel. The true pronunciation is more like 'wize-well' consistent with the original spellings of "Wyswell" or "Wiswall". There are several theories about the origins of the name. It is said to take its name from Old Molly's Well, a local landmark, later to become known as Wise Woman's Well (Wise Well). Alternatively, 'Wis' could have been part of the name of an Old English personal name.

== History ==
Vicarage House, on Vicarage Fold at the southern edge of the village, dates from the 17th century. A Grade I listed structure, it has been described as "the most interesting building" in the village.

== Governance ==
Wiswell was once a township in the ancient parish of Whalley. This became a civil parish in 1866, forming part of the Clitheroe Rural District from 1894 to 1974. Parts of the parish transferred to Sabden on its creation in 1904. (Note: The old township also shared a boundary with Read at Sabden Brook.) It has since become part of the borough of Ribble Valley. In 2015 Barrow was split from Wiswell to form a separate parish council.

Along with Barrow (since 2015), Pendleton, Mearley and Worston, the parish forms the Wiswell and Pendleton ward of Ribble Valley Borough Council. The ward had a population of 1,289 in 2001, rising to 1,316 in 2011. The ward elects a single councillor, who currently is Robert Thompson of the Conservative Party.

== Amenities ==
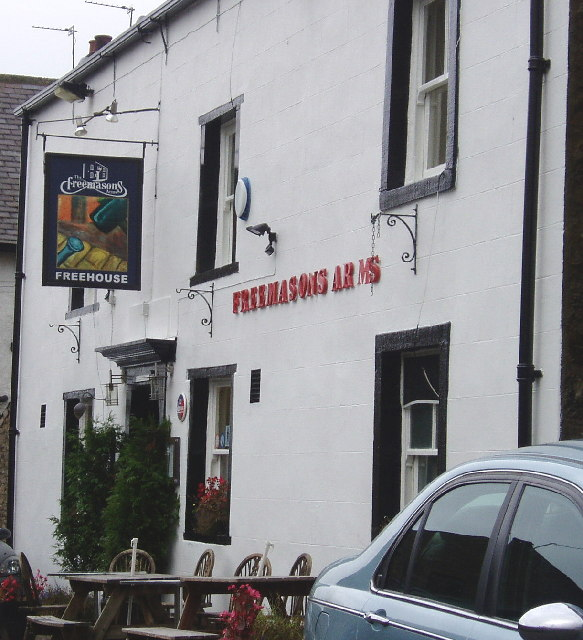
The Freemason's Arms

Today the village only boasts a pub/restaurant (Freemasons Arms) located on Vicarage Fold a pretty unadopted highway. However, there used to be a small corner shop, school and church; the names of each still stand on the original buildings but they are now prominent houses in the village.

The property in which the current pub operates was not originally designed as a public house. It was formerly three small cottages one of which was a freemasons' lodge, which is how it acquired its name. The original village pub, the Lamb Inn, was located adjacent to the public phone box, but no longer exists and is now known as Clegg House, a residence on the corner of Coronation Gardens. The Lamb Inn closed over 150 years ago and Wiswell was without a pub for some time as the Freemasons did not open until considerably later on.

== Population ==
Towards the end of the 19th century about forty per cent of the people who lived in Wiswell left to live elsewhere. This was probably related to job losses (through the temporary closure of the Barrow mill) and significant employment opportunities elsewhere. The British census figures taken every ten years from 1801 to 1871 show the population changes.

The census uses the highway from Whalley to Pendleton to divide Wiswell into 'West' and 'East':

West
Wiswell township (part of) in the parish of Whalley. All that part of the township of Wiswell which lies on the Western side of the highway leading from the town of Whalley to the village of Pendleton and which passes through the town of Wiswell [and includes Barrow].

East
All that part of the township of Wiswell which lies on the Eastern side of the Highway leading from Whalley to Pendleton including Briggs farm, Busskens Hill, Wiswell Hall, Wiswell Eaves and the remaining cottages on the Eastern side of the Highway.

In the censuses from 1801 to 1841, the population rose sharply and stabilised between 1841 and 1851 at about 750 people. Following this the population declined sharply to about 420 in 1871.

The change in population in the 1850s was dramatic. It seems likely that the Barrow Print Works closed for a time after 1851 or at least significantly reduced its workforce. Notes in the 1861 census highlight "a decrease in the population of the Townships of Wiswell and Whalley which is attributed to the discontinuance of employment in the Printworks."

== See also ==
- Listed buildings in Wiswell
