= Pendle Hill =

Hill in Lancashire, England

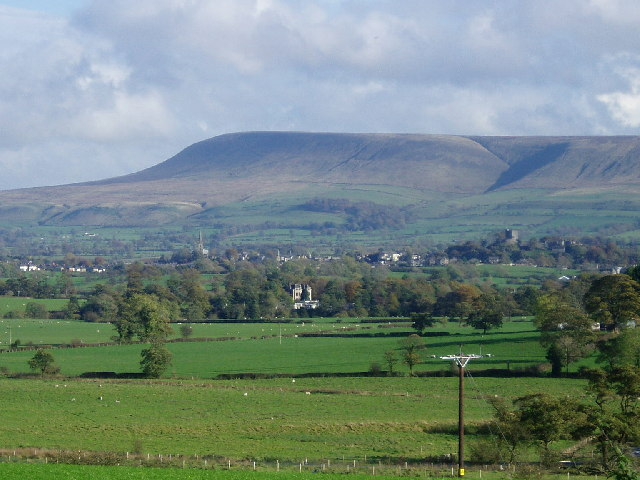
- Pendle Hill from the Ribble Valley

Highest point
- Elevation: 557 m (1,827 ft)
- Prominence: c. 395 metres (1,296 ft)
- Parent peak: Kinder Scout
- Listing: Marilyn
- Coordinates: 53°52′08″N 2°18′00″W

Geography
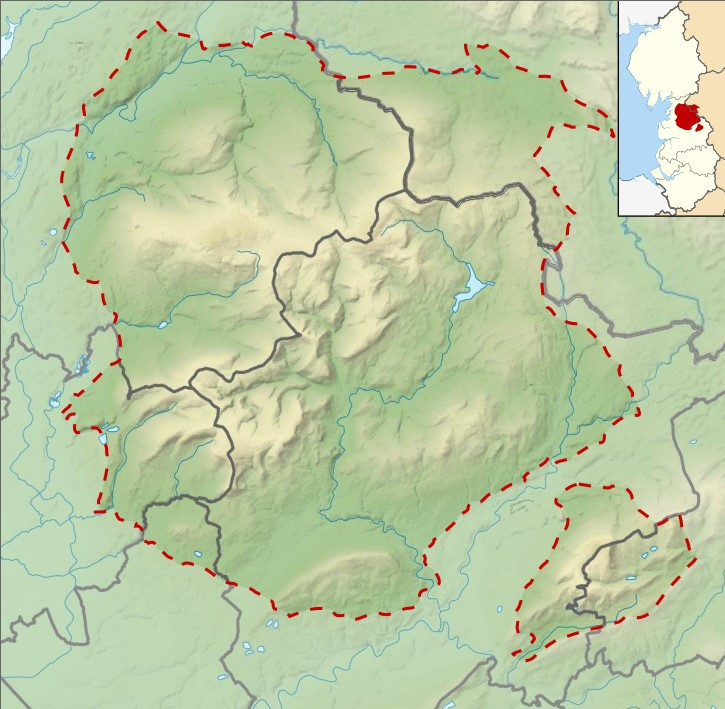
- Location within the Forest of Bowland Location within Lancashire Location within the Borough of Ribble Valley Location within the Borough of Pendle Location within England
- Location: Lancashire, England
- OS grid: SD804414
- Topo map: OS Landranger 103

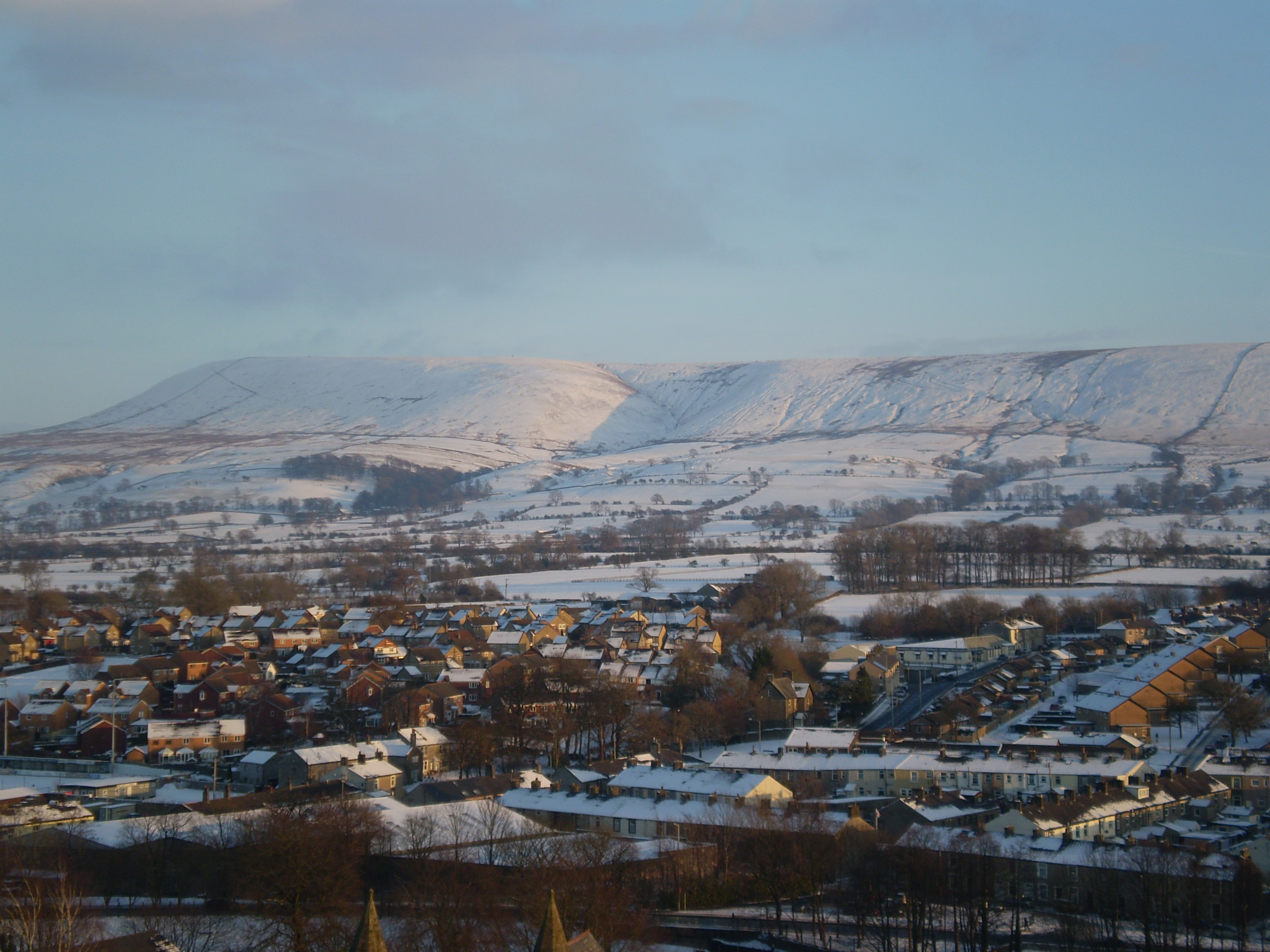
Pendle Hill in winter 2010

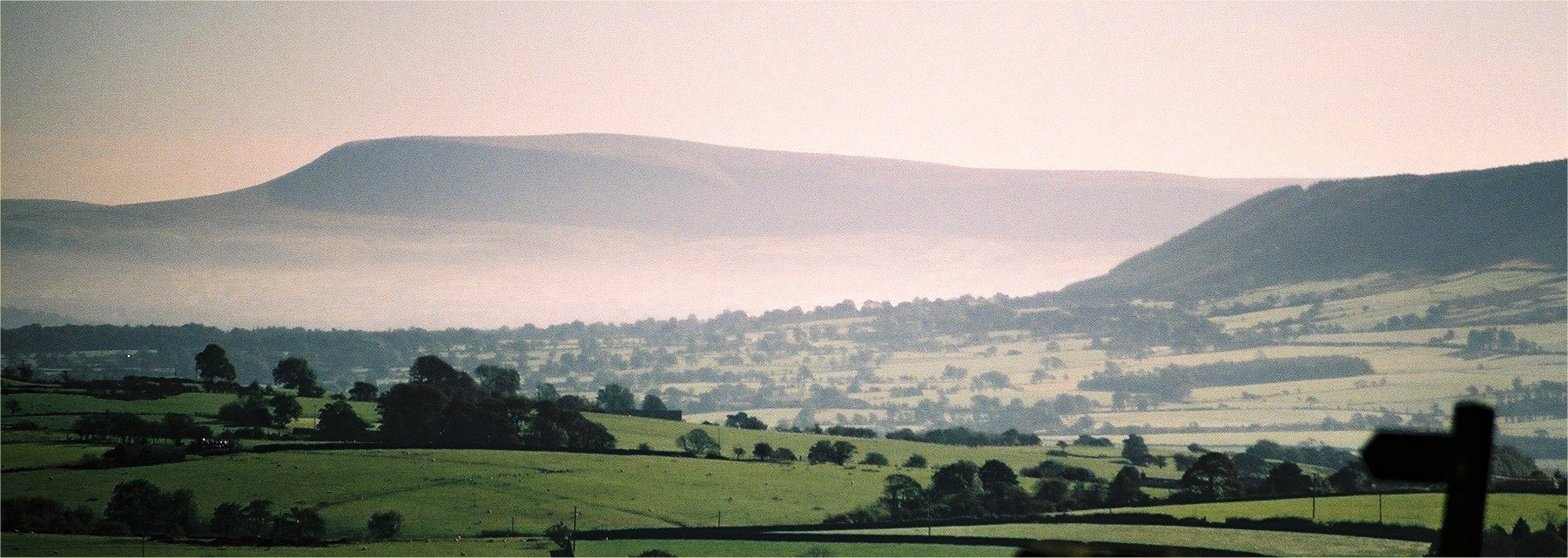
Pendle from the west. (Longridge Fell is to the right.)

Pendle Hill is in the east of Lancashire, England, near the towns of Burnley, Nelson, Colne, Brierfield, Clitheroe and Padiham. Its summit is 557 metres (1,827 ft) above mean sea level. It gives its name to the Borough of Pendle. It is an isolated hill in the Pennines, separated from the South Pennines to the east, the Bowland Fells to the northwest, and the West Pennine Moors to the south. It is included in a detached part of the Forest of Bowland Area of Outstanding Natural Beauty.

== History ==
The name "Pendle Hill" combines the words for hill from two different languages (including two from the same language at different stages of its history) - as does Bredon Hill in Worcestershire. In the 13th century it was called Pennul or Penhul, apparently from the Cumbric pen and Old English hyll, both meaning "hill". The modern English "hill" was appended later, after the original meaning of Pendle had become opaque.

Neolithic and Bronze Age burial sites have been discovered at and around the summit of the hill.

There is an ancient local legend that the Devil once jumped from Hameldon Hill to an outcrop overlooking Sabden, on the southwest slope of Pendle, leaving footprints in the sandstone. Here he gathered rocks in an apron, and after proceeding the short distance to Apronfull, threw a boulder aimed at Clitheroe Castle. At that moment the apron string broke causing the boulder to land near Pendleton and creating the pile of rocks atop the slight prominence there.

The hill is famous for its links to three events which took place in the 17th century: the Pendle witch trials (1612), Richard Towneley's barometer experiment (1661), and the vision of George Fox (1652), which led to the foundation of the Religious Society of Friends (Quaker) movement.

=== Quakers ===
In his autobiography, George Fox said he had a vision on Pendle Hill in 1652, during the early years of the Quakers:

As we travelled, we came near a very great hill, called Pendle Hill, and I was moved of the Lord to go up to the top of it; which I did with difficulty, it was so very steep and high. When I was come to the top, I saw the sea bordering upon Lancashire. From the top of this hill the Lord let me see in what places he had a great people to be gathered.

— George Fox: An Autobiography, Chapter 6

Pendle continues to be linked to the Quakers, who take pilgrimage there and use the name for the Pendle Hill Quaker Center for Study and Contemplation near Philadelphia, Pennsylvania.

=== Witches and the supernatural ===
The story of the Pendle witches is a notorious and well-documented example of cases brought against alleged witches in 17th-century England.

The area became popular with ghost hunters after Living channel's show Most Haunted visited it for a live investigation on Halloween 2004. The show's presenter, Yvette Fielding, said it was the scariest episode they had made.

Pendle Hill and the surrounding area are the setting for 1951's classic Mist Over Pendle by Robert Neill, and also for the fourth book in Joseph Delaney's Spook's series, called The Spook's Battle.

"The Witchfinders", the eighth episode of the eleventh series of the British science fiction television programme Doctor Who, takes place during the 17th-century Pendle witch trials.

To mark the 400th anniversary, in January 2012 local artist Philippe Handford created a huge installation by putting '1612' on the side of Pendle Hill using 1,500 metres (4,900 ft) of horticultural fleece.

== Geography ==
=== Topography ===
Pendle Hill is separated from the nearby main bulk of the Bowland Fells by the River Ribble. This isolation means that Pendle Hill is in fact the most prominent child summit of Kinder Scout, far away in the Peak District, rather than a child of Ward's Stone, the highest point in Bowland. It is included in a detached part of the Forest of Bowland Area of Outstanding Natural Beauty.

Pendle Water, which runs through Ogden Clough, has its source on the summit plateau, heading southwest before turning back to the east as it falls into the Ogden valley. It joins the Lancashire Calder near Burnley, a few miles upstream from the confluence with Sabden Brook, which drains the southwest slopes of the hill. Mearley Brook cuts a large clough onto the northwest face, with its tributaries and those of Pendleton Brook draining this side directly into the River Ribble.

=== Geology ===
The sloping plateau summit of Pendle Hill is formed from the Pendle Grit, a coarse Carboniferous age sandstone assigned to the Millstone Grit Group. It overlies a thick sequence of Carboniferous Limestone beds. In chronostratigraphy, the British sub-stage of the Carboniferous period, the 'Pendleian' derives its name from Pendle Hill where an exposure in Light Clough is taken as the type locality.

Much of the lower slopes are mantled by thick deposits of glacial till or boulder clay dating from the last ice age. The historic decomposition of sphagnum moss on the hill has led to it being covered in peat.

The steep slopes of its eastern and southern flanks have given rise to a series of landslips.

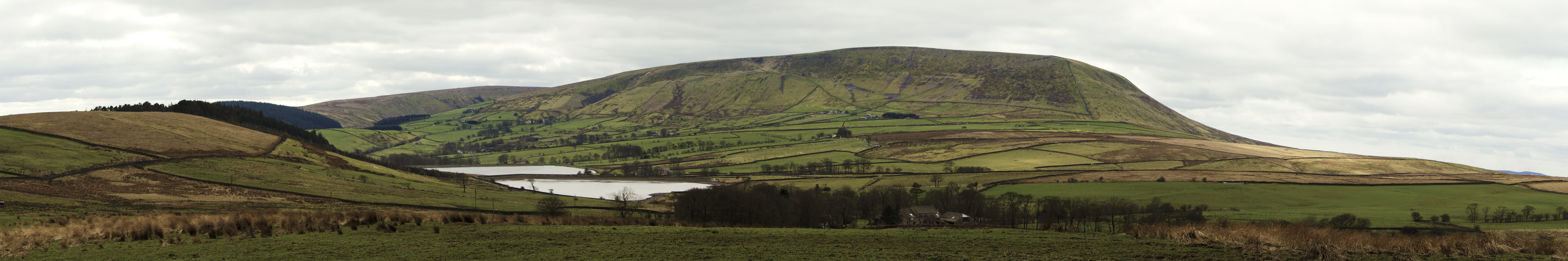
A panoramic image of Pendle Hill in 2012 showing the northeast slopes, known as the Big End, overlooking Black Moss Reservoirs on the edge of Barley-with-Wheatley Booth. The footpath from Barley (not pictured) to the summit can be seen ascending from left to right. (The full-size image is 10 times larger.)

== See also ==
- Forest of Pendle
- Pendelfin, a Burnley-based stoneware company named after Pendle Hill
- Pendle Way
- Lancashire Witches Walk
